= Rage (emotion) =

Feeling of intense or growing anger

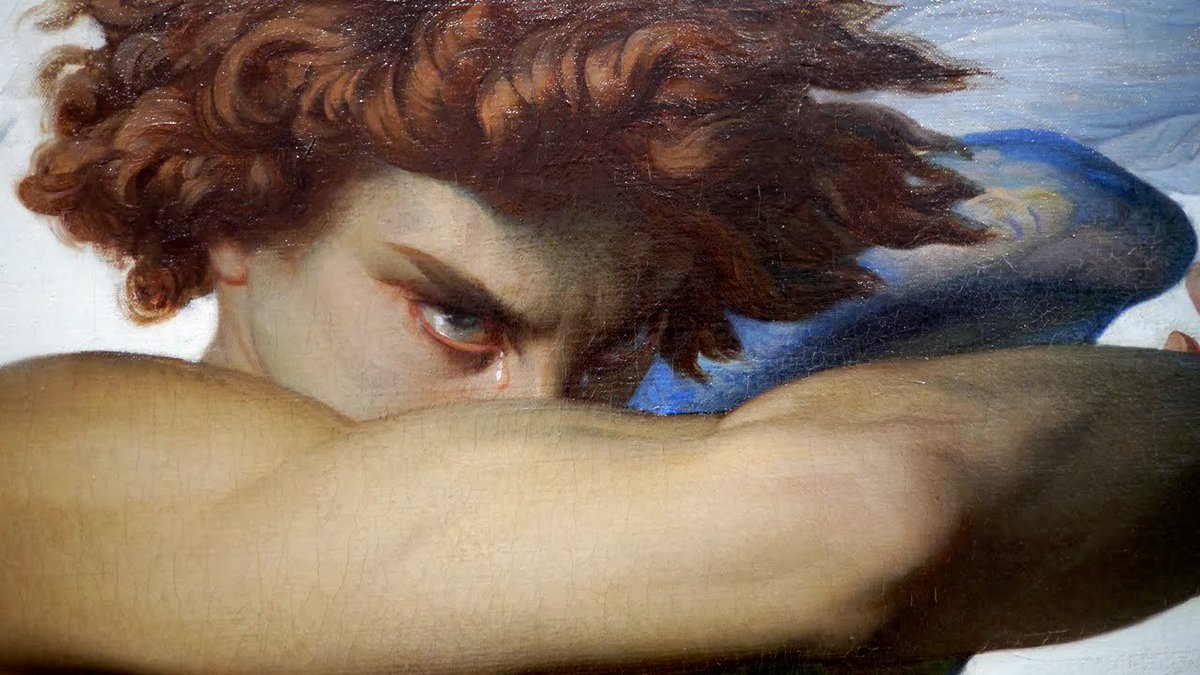
The Fallen Angel painting depicting Lucifer in a state of rage.

Rage (also known as frenzy or fury) is intense, uncontrolled anger that is an increased stage of hostile response to a perceived egregious injury or injustice.

== Etymology ==
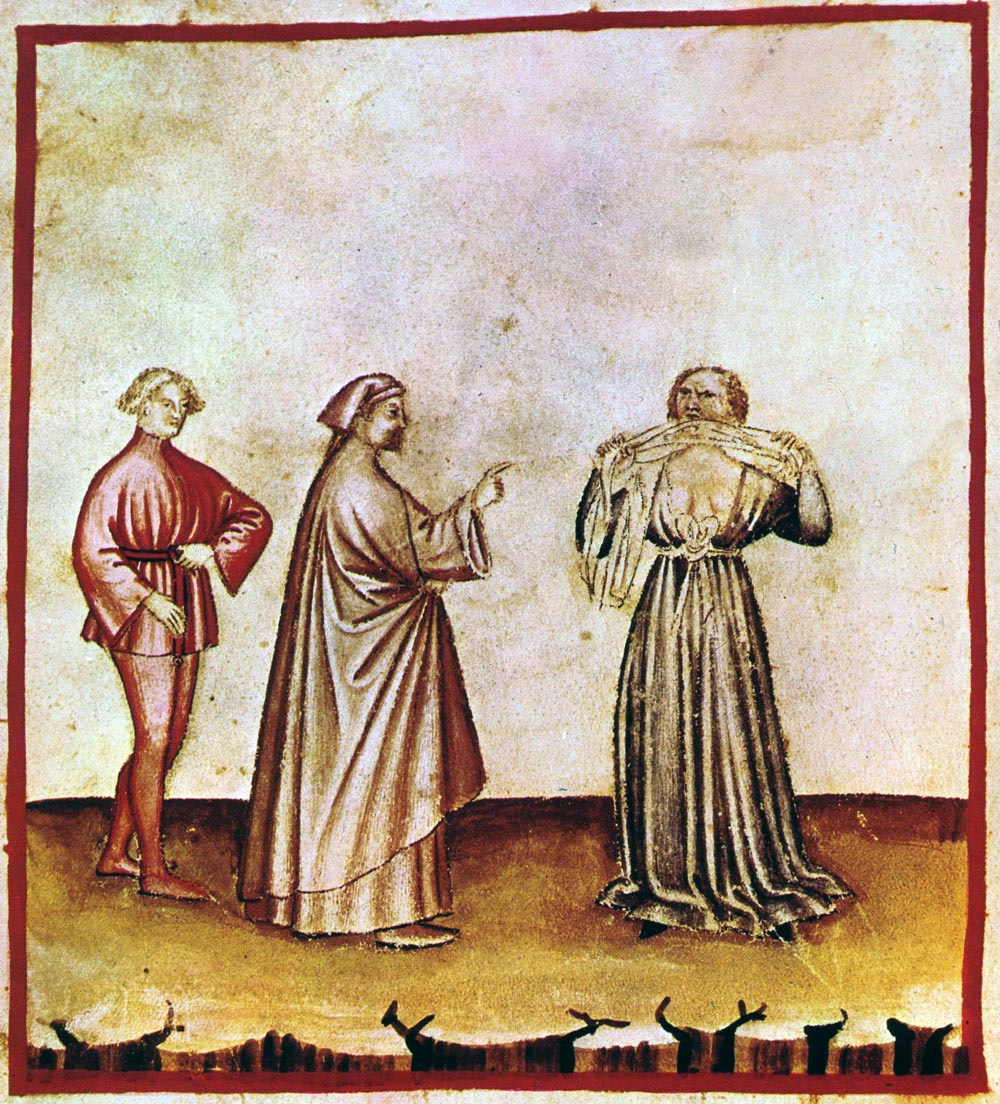
Rage, Tacuinum Sanitatis casanatensis (14th century).

The word "rage" is from c. 1300, meaning "madness, insanity; a fit of frenzy; rashness, foolhardiness, intense or violent emotion, anger, wrath; fierceness in battle; violence" (of storms, fire, etc.); from the Old French rage or raige, meaning "spirit, passion, rage, fury, madness"; from 11th-century Medieval Latin rabia; from the Latin rabies, meaning "madness, rage, fury," which is related to the Latin rabere "be mad, rave."

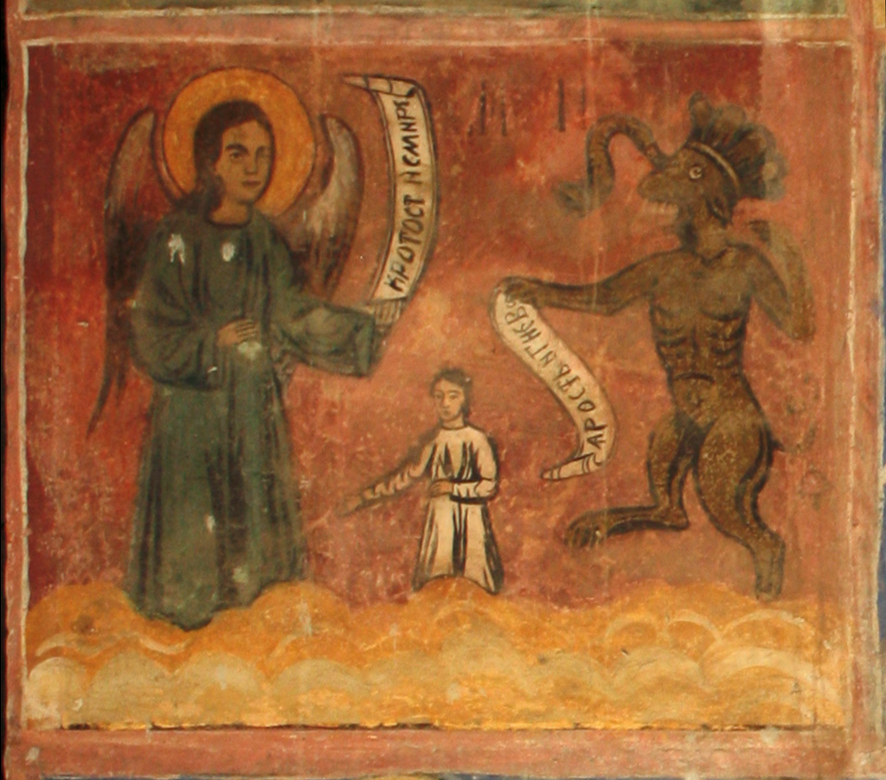
Angel with Temperance and Humility virtues versus Devil with Rage and Anger sins. A fresco from the 1717 Saint Nicholas church in Bukovets, Pernik Province, Bulgaria.

There are many cognates. The Latin rabies, meaning "anger, fury", is akin to the Sanskrit raag (violence). The Vulgar Latin spelling of the word possesses many cognates when translated into many of the modern Romance languages, such as Spanish, Galician, Catalan, Portuguese, and modern Italian: rabia, rabia, ràbia, raiva, and rabbia respectively.

== Symptoms and effects ==
Rage can sometimes lead to a state of mind where the individuals experiencing it believe they can do, and often are capable of doing, things that may normally seem physically impossible. Those experiencing rage usually feel the effects of high adrenaline levels in the body. This increase in adrenal output raises the physical strength and endurance levels of the person and sharpens their senses, while dulling the sensation of pain. High levels of adrenaline impair memory. Temporal perspective is also affected: people in a rage have described experiencing events in slow-motion. Rational thought and reasoning would inhibit an individual from acting rapidly upon impulse. An older explanation of this "time dilation" effect is that instead of actually slowing our perception of time, high levels of adrenaline increase our ability to recall specific minutiae of an event after it occurs. Since humans gauge time based on the number of things they can remember, high-adrenaline events such as those experienced during periods of rage seem to unfold more slowly.

A person in a state of rage may also lose much of their capacity for rational thought and reasoning, and may act, usually violently, on their impulses to the point that they may attack until they themselves have been incapacitated or the source of their rage has been destroyed or otherwise removed. A person in rage may also experience tunnel vision, muffled hearing, increased heart rate, and hyperventilation. Their vision may also become "rose-tinted" (hence "seeing red"). They often focus only on the source of their anger. The large amounts of adrenaline and oxygen in the bloodstream may cause a person's extremities to shake. Psychiatrists consider rage to be at one end of the spectrum of anger, and annoyance to be at the other side.

In 1995, rage was hypothesized to occur when oxytocin, vasopressin, and corticotropin-releasing hormone are rapidly released from the hypothalamus. This results in the pituitary gland producing and releasing large amounts of the adrenocorticotropic hormone, which causes the adrenal cortex to release corticosteroids. This chain reaction occurs when faced with a threatening situation.

Nearly two decades later, more came to be known about the impacts of high epinephrine. Studies suggest glucose, together with epinephrine from the adrenal medulla have an effect on memory. Although high doses of epinephrine have been proven to impair memory, moderate doses of epinephrine actually enhance memory. This leads to questioning the role that epinephrine has played on the evolution of the genus Homo as well as epinephrine's crucial role during fits of rage. The crucial role that astrocytes play in the formation of muscle memory may also shed light on the beneficial impact of meditation and deep breathing as a method of managing and controlling one's rage.

== Health complications ==
Some research suggests that an individual is more susceptible to having feelings of depression and anxiety if they experience rage on a frequent basis. Health complications become much worse if an individual represses feelings of rage. John E. Sarno believes that repressed rage in the subconscious leads to physical ailments. Cardiac stress and hypertension are other health complications that may occur when rage is experienced on a regular basis. Psychopathologies, such as depression and post-traumatic stress disorder (PTSD) regularly present comorbidly with rage.

== Treatment ==
=== Types of therapy ===
Evidence has shown that behavioral and cognitive therapy techniques have assisted individuals that have difficulties controlling their anger or rage. Role playing and personal study are the two main techniques used to aid individuals with managing rage. Role playing is utilized by angering an individual to the point of rage and then showing them how to control it. Multi-modal cognitive therapy is another treatment used to help individuals cope with anger. This therapy teaches individuals relaxation techniques, problem solving skills, and techniques on response disruption. This type of therapy has proven to be effective for individuals that are highly stressed and are prone to rage.

An emerging business is the rage room, a place where people relieve their stress by destroying objects within a room.

== Psychology ==
According to psychologists, rage is an in-born behavior that every person exhibits in some form. Rage is often used to denote hostile/affective/reactive aggression. Rage tends to be expressed when a person faces a threat to their pride, position, self-deceptive beliefs, or socioeconomic status.

Cases in which rage is exhibited as a direct response to an individual's deeply held religious beliefs, may directly be related to cognitive dissonance in relation to an individual's ability to manage the terror associated with death and dying. Many researchers have questioned whether Hindu/Buddhist concepts, such as reincarnation and nibbâna, help ease death anxieties. Coleman and Ka-Ying Hui (2012) stated that "according to the Terror Management Theory, a religious concept of an afterlife helps people manage their personal death anxiety". This suggests that rage, in relation to religious ideas, may stem from an inability to manage feelings of terror.

Some psychologists, however, such as Bushman and Anderson, argue that the hostile/predatory dichotomy that is commonly employed in psychology fails to define rage fully, since it is possible for anger to motivate aggression, provoking vengeful behavior, without incorporating the impulsive thinking that is characteristic of rage. They point to individuals or groups such as Seung-Hui Cho in the Virginia Tech massacre or Eric Harris and Dylan Klebold of the Columbine High School massacre, all of whom clearly experienced intense anger and hate, but whose planning (sometimes over periods of years), forethought, and lack of impulsive behavior is readily observable.

== See also ==
- Air rage
- Bike rage
- Computer rage
- Intermittent explosive disorder
- Moral emotions
- Narcissistic rage
- Road rage
- Wrap rage
