= Structural encroachment =

A structural encroachment is a concept in real property law, in which a piece of real property projects from one property over or under the property line of another landowner's premises. The actual structure that encroaches might be a tree, bush, bay window, stairway, steps, stoop, garage, leaning fence, part of a building, or other fixture. Some attorneys classify it as a type of easement, related to an easement in gross, while some scholars classify such as one type of encroachment.

== Creation ==
When a structural encroachment is created intentionally, it is basically an easement in gross, and may be done by a permit to a government authority. A zoning law may also restrict an intentional structural encroachment.

A structural encroachment may also be created by necessity, by accident, or by prescription.

== Other uses ==
- In some medical contexts, a lump protruding into a blood vessel is described as a structural encroachment.
- In some ecological contexts, the process of a peatmoss overgrowing, or bogging down a vascular plant is described as a structural encroachment.

== In popular culture ==
- In the movie Stuart Saves His Family, the Smalley family must pay for a structural encroachment of the late aunt's house over a neighbor's property, which results in an action to quiet title. The other members of his family attempt to get him to commit perjury, which he refuses to do, so the family must pay for the easement.

== See also ==
- Adverse possession
- Appropriation (economics)
- Footpath encroachment
- Trespass
