= Parking violation =

Offence caused while a vehicle is parked

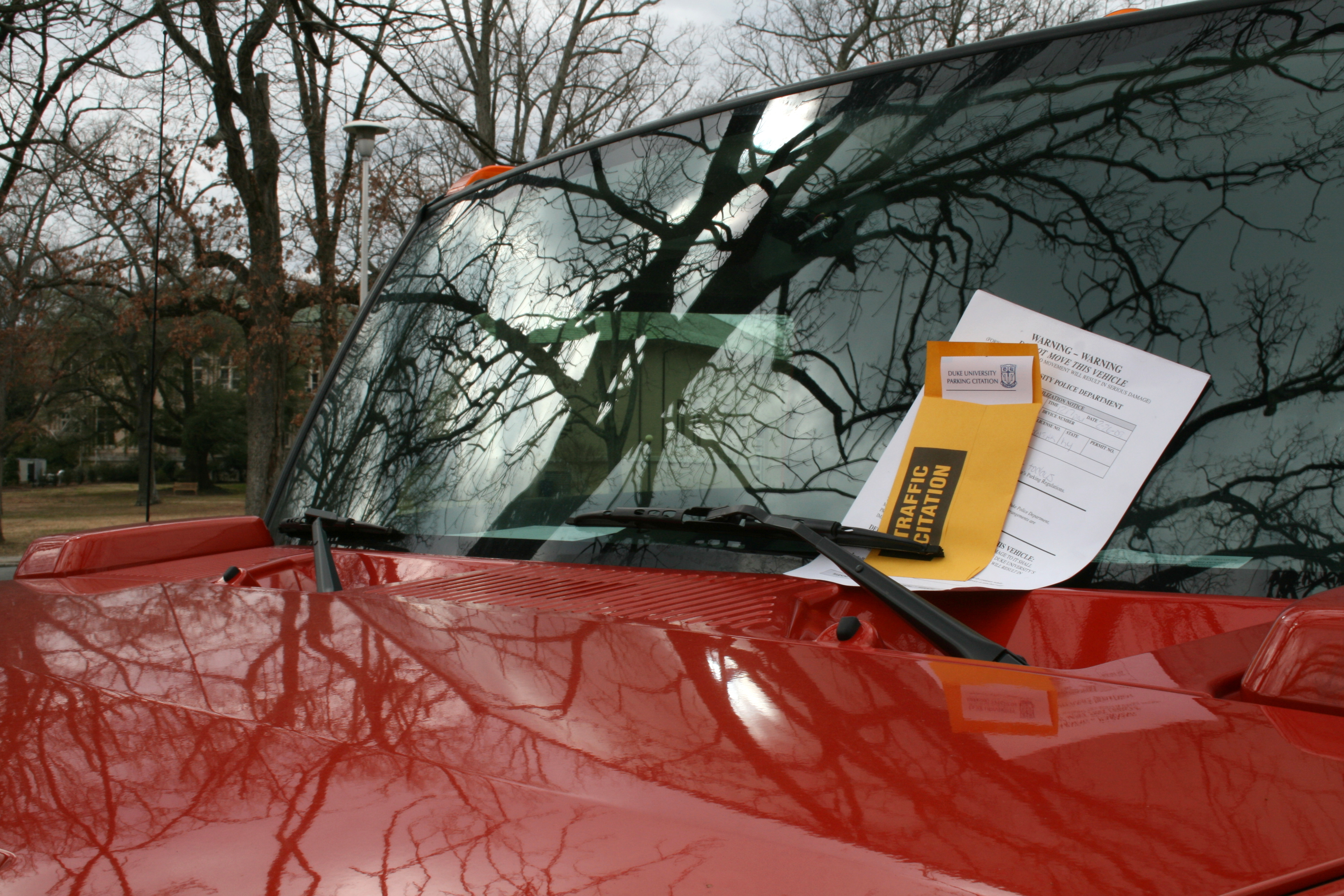
Parking tickets on a Hummer H2 in Durham, North Carolina

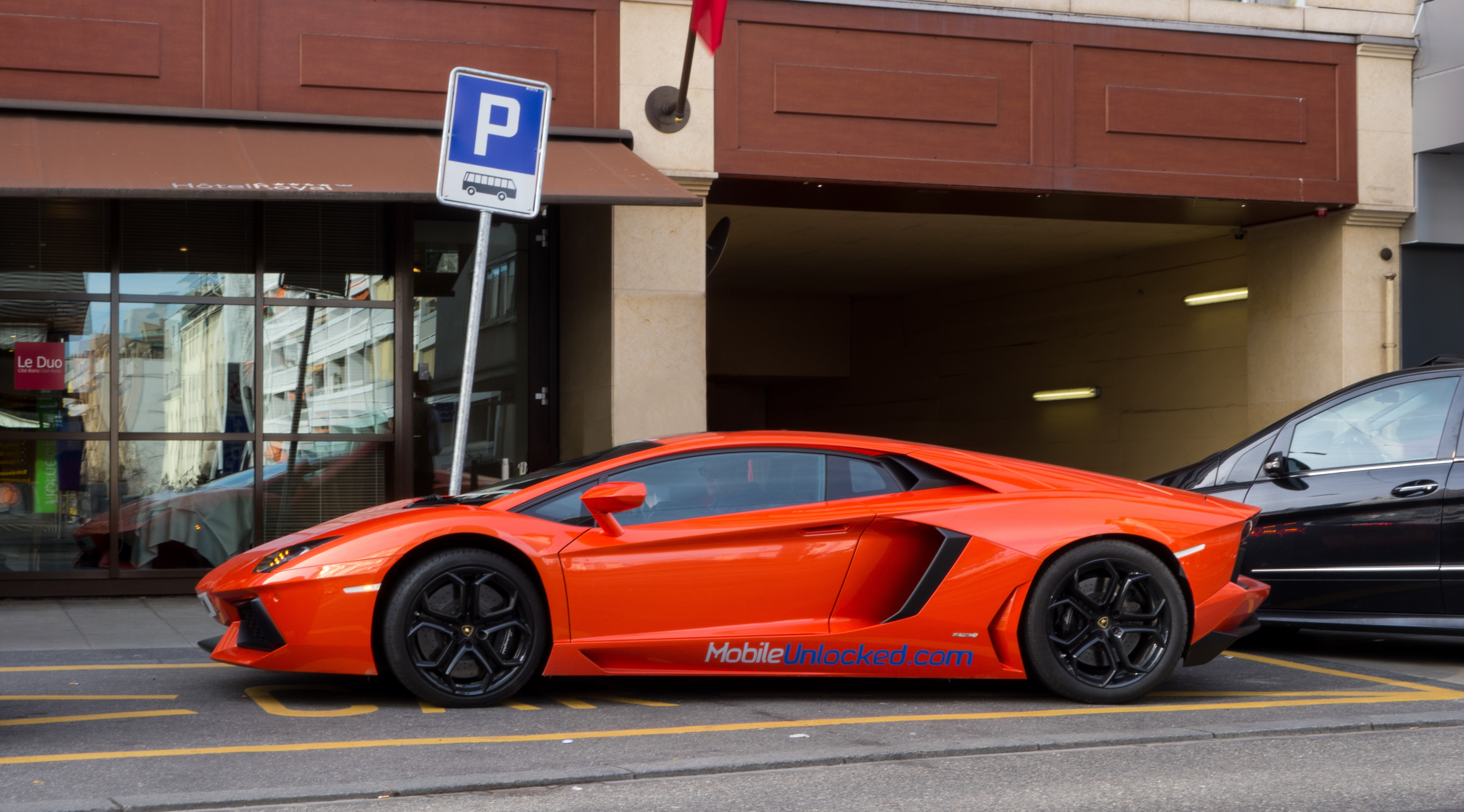
Lamborghini parked in a bus-only zone in Geneva, Switzerland, a parking violation

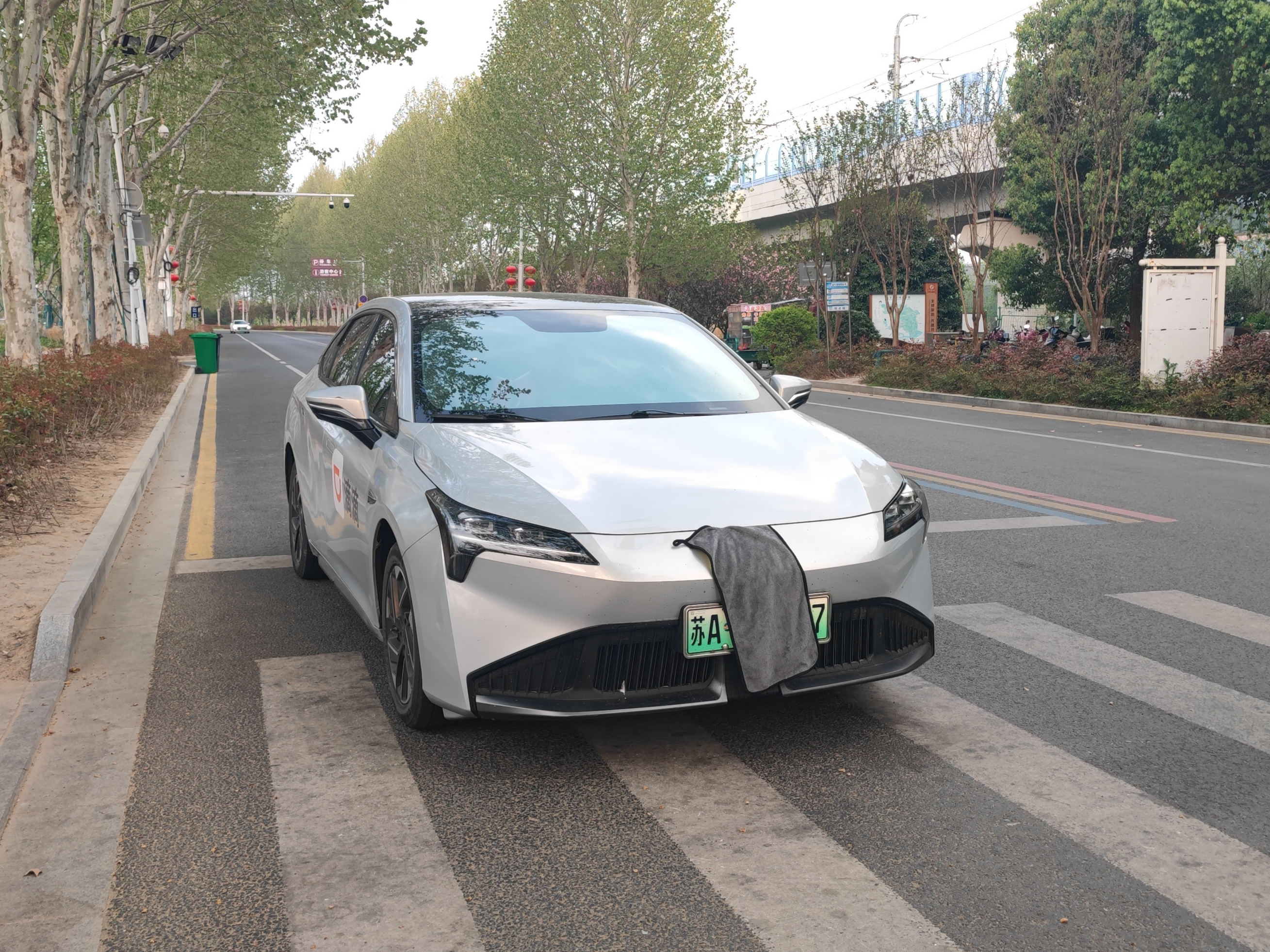
A car parked on a crosswalk in Nanjing, China, a parking violation

A parking violation occurs when a motor vehicle is parked in a restricted or unauthorized location. It is illegal to park in the middle of a highway or road, but parking on the sides may be allowed with restrictions. Violations are typically documented with a traffic ticket issued by a police officer or government official.

Parking ticket fines generate revenue for municipalities and can also aid in criminal investigations. For instance, the NYPD used a parking ticket on serial murderer David Berkowitz's car to help identify and arrest him, leading to the capture of the notorious serial killer known as "The Son of Sam".

== Examples ==
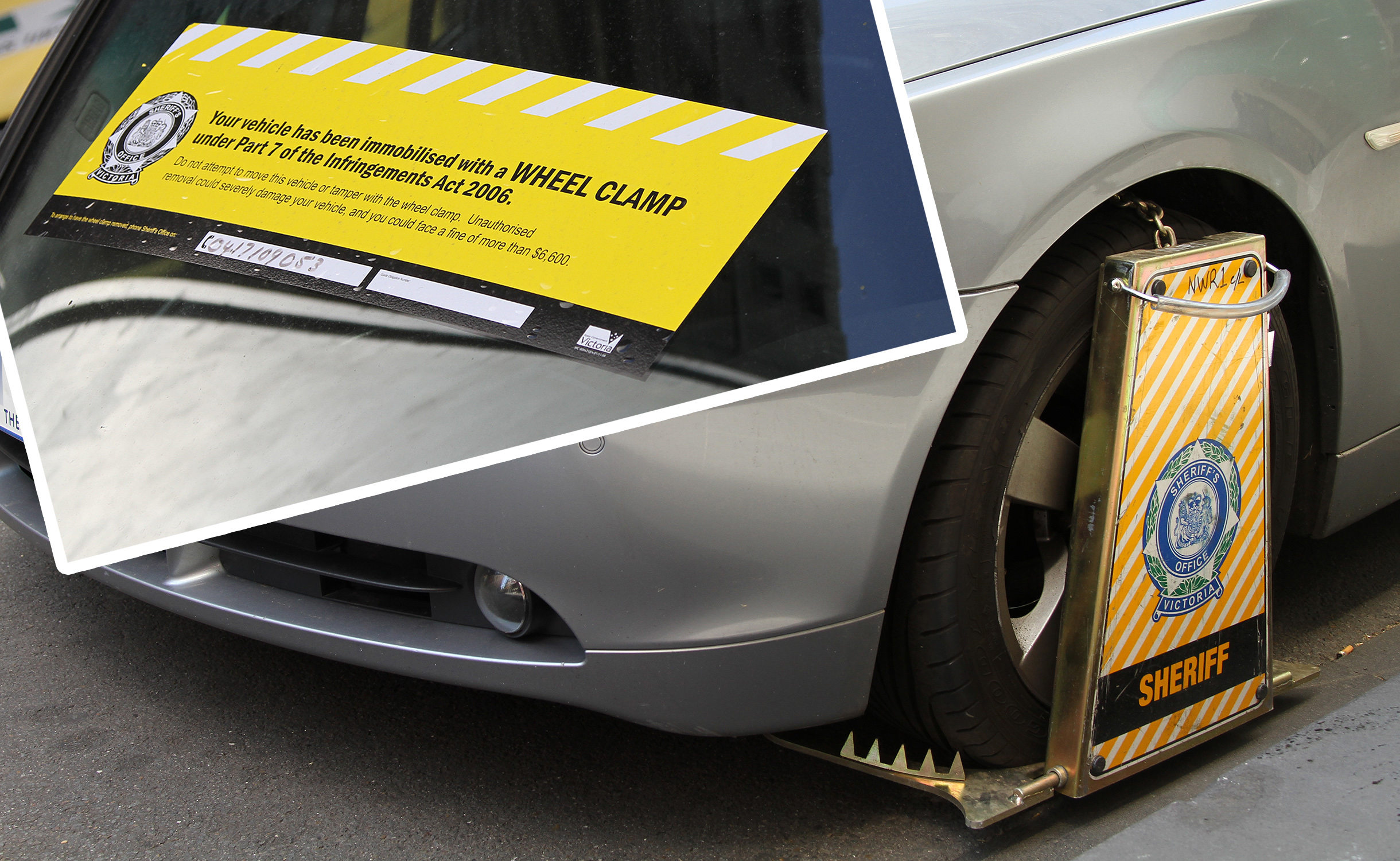
Vehicles may be wheel-clamped for parking violations, such as this BMW 5 Series in Melbourne, as a penalty or to enforce payment of fines

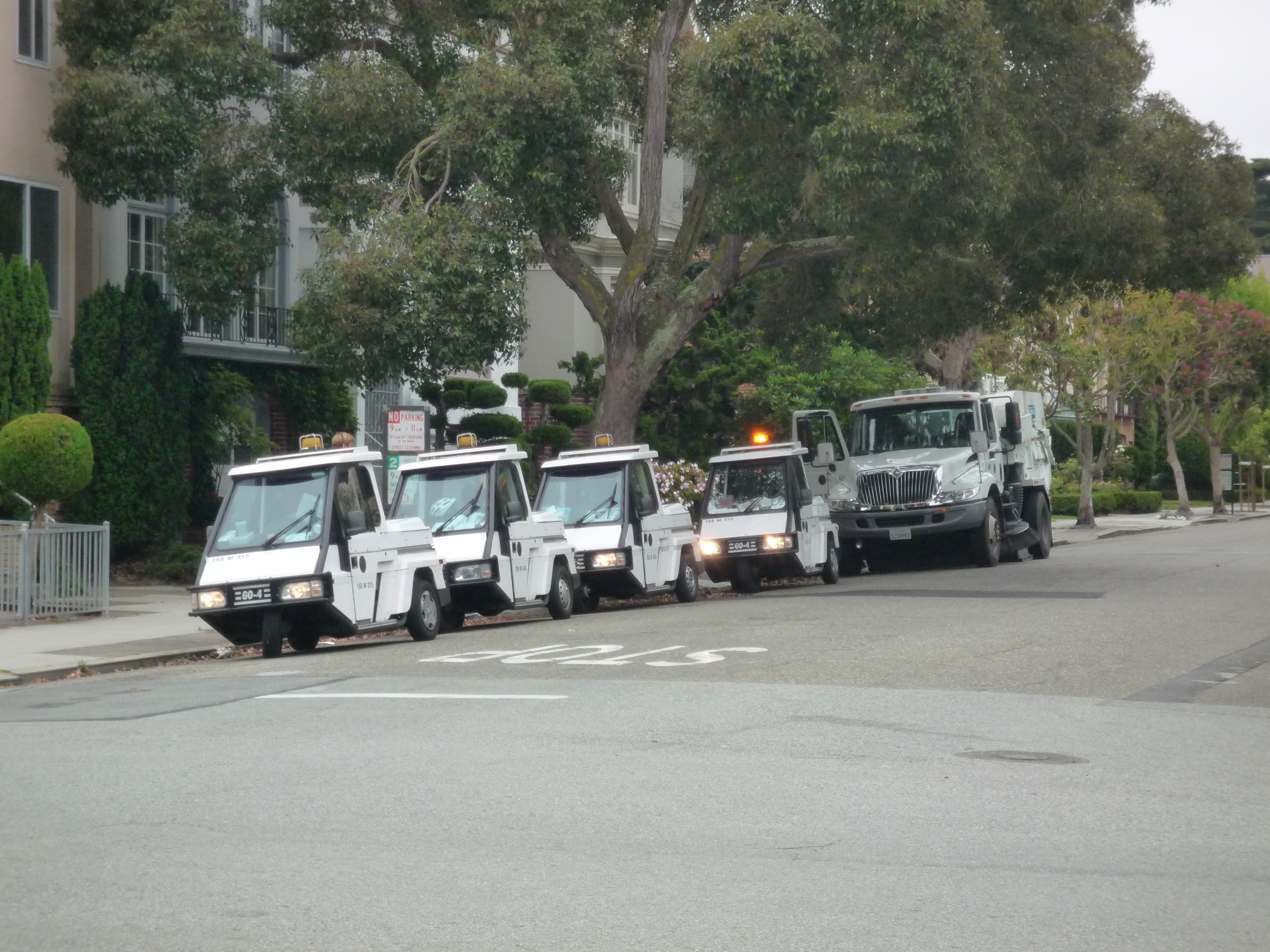
Four parking attendant vehicles and a street cleaning vehicle in San Francisco

Some examples of parking violations include, but are not limited to:

- Parking in a prohibited space such as a bus stop.
- Parking on a sidewalk (generally prohibited unless signs indicate otherwise).
- Parking too close to or within an intersection, railroad crossing or crosswalk.
- Double parking.
- Parking at a parking meter without payment or exceeding the paid time limit.
- Parking in a disabled zone without a permit.
- Parking during time periods when parking is prohibited.
- During winter weather conditions, on-street parking rules are enforced to ensure clear access for snowplows.

Fines or parking citations may be issued for non-compliance with the listed criteria.

== United States ==
Unpaid parking violations per diplomat in New York City by country of origin, 1997-2002.

A parking ticket issued in the city of Berkeley, California

In 1926, American merchants identified downtown traffic congestion as a major issue, attributing it to unenforced curbside parking and inadequate off-street parking facilities. This led customers to choose locations where parking was more readily available.

During the Great Depression, cities faced declining revenues. The introduction of parking meters in the 1930's provided a new source of income through nickel payments and fines for over parking. By 1944, American cities were generating $10 million annually from parking meters. Meter maids, boosted city revenues.

A ticket is typically placed on a vehicle when the owner or driver is not present. In California, the registered owner cannot be charged with a misdemeanor for ignoring a ticket. Sanctions may include refusal to renew license plates for unpaid parking tickets. In some places like New York City, vehicles with overdue fines may be towed and auctioned if not redeemed. In Boston, vehicles with multiple outstanding citations may be booted.

No Parking Signs

No parking, MUTCD R7-1

No parking, CA MUTCD R-28

No parking, NYSDOT NYP1-2

No parking, PennDOT R7-7A

No parking with restrictions and localized, NYCDOT SC-346C

"Don't even think of parking here" sign, NYCDOT

== Europe ==
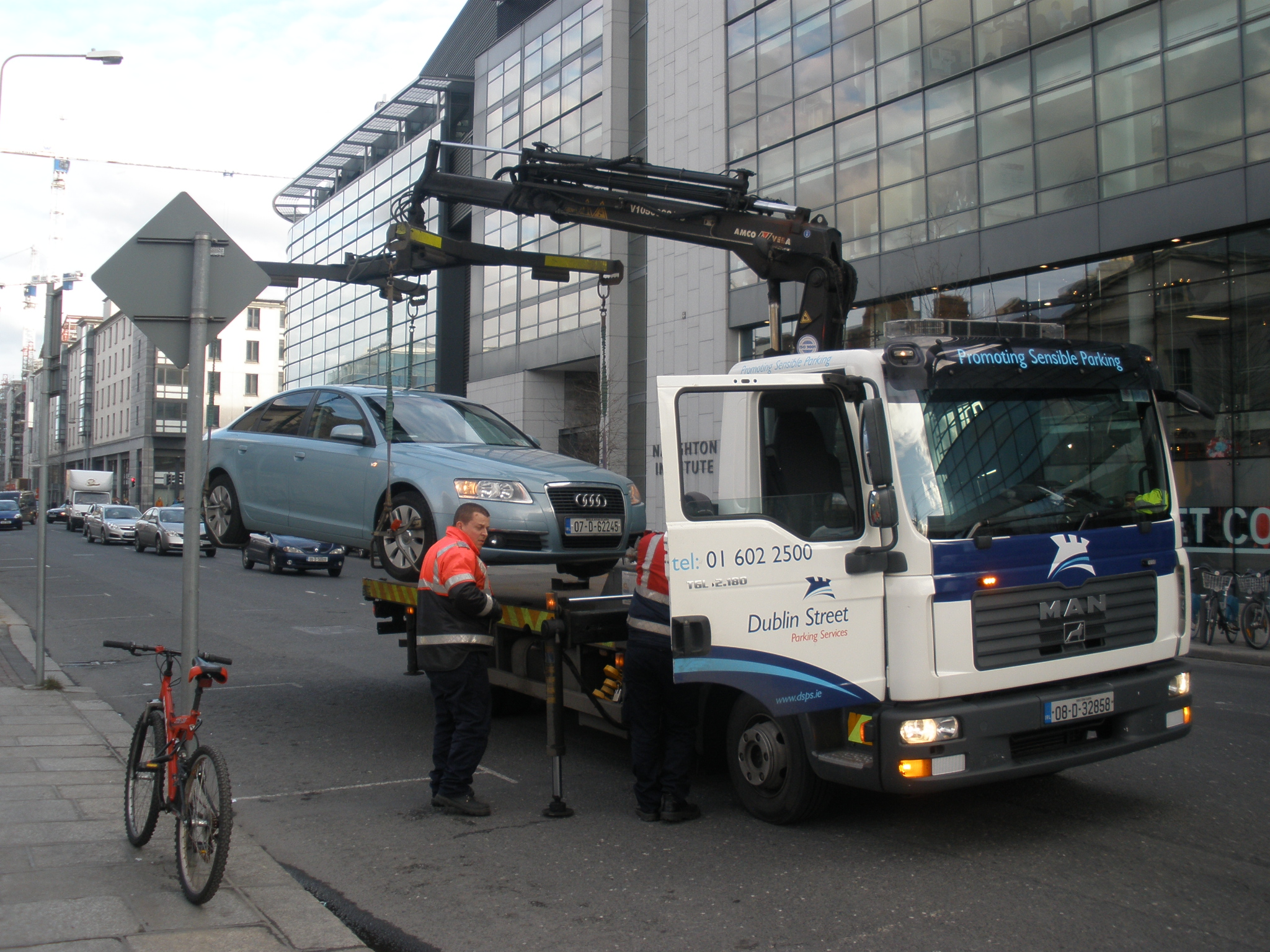
Car being towed in Ireland

2135 photos of illegal parking received by the Portuguese civil organization Passeio Livre (Free sidewalk) published on their 5th anniversary

In Sweden, parking violations on the street are considered traffic crimes with fines imposed by the Swedish Enforcement Administration. Off-street parking violations are treated as breaches of contract with penalty fees. Statistics from Stockholm show that Jeep, Mercedes-Benz, Porsche, and Lexus owners have the highest number of parking violations, with Mercedes-Benz owners often parking in disabled spaces. This behavior is attributed to their perceived wealth and time constraints according to experts. Higher fines are suggested to deter affluent individuals from ignoring parking regulations.

No waiting (left) and no stopping (right) signs in Sweden

In the UK and Europe, "no waiting" and "no stopping" signs are used in addition to "no parking" signs. "No waiting" permits dropping off or picking up passengers but prohibits parking or waiting with the driver in the vehicle for extended periods. Loading and unloading are typically allowed, with specific details and times indicated on a plate below the sign. "No stopping" prohibits any waiting, including drop-offs and pick-ups.

The European Union directive on cross-border exchange of information for road safety offences focuses on 18 specific traffic violations and does not cover parking violations. In cross-border cases, European countries can appoint debt enforcement companies to recover unpaid parking ticket fines.

== South Korea ==
The Gyeonggi Development Institute (경기개발연구원) highlighted that "South Korea's parking problem stems from a lack of awareness about paying parking fees". A survey revealed that 56.1% of drivers responded "avoid paying fees if possible", while only 5.8% believed in paying naturally. This mindset leads to widespread parking violations, causing pedestrian inconvenience, traffic congestion, and hindering emergency vehicle access. Professor Kim Jinhyeong (김진형) of the Korea Road Traffic Authority noted "South Korean drivers have a strong perception that parking is free", and that "even when fined for parking, they tend to think that it's 'bad luck'." He explained, "Even in Japan, they think that drivers should naturally pay for parking". Researcher Jang Taekyeong (장택영) suggested increasing the fine, stating "the current parking violation fine is around 40,000 won, which is not much different from the 1980s", and that "there is a need to raise the fine to make drivers more cautious"

== New Zealand ==
In New Zealand, parking fines are primarily issued by council parking officers or police officers. If a ticket fee is not paid on time, it can be passed to a court and it becomes a fine.

== Gallery ==
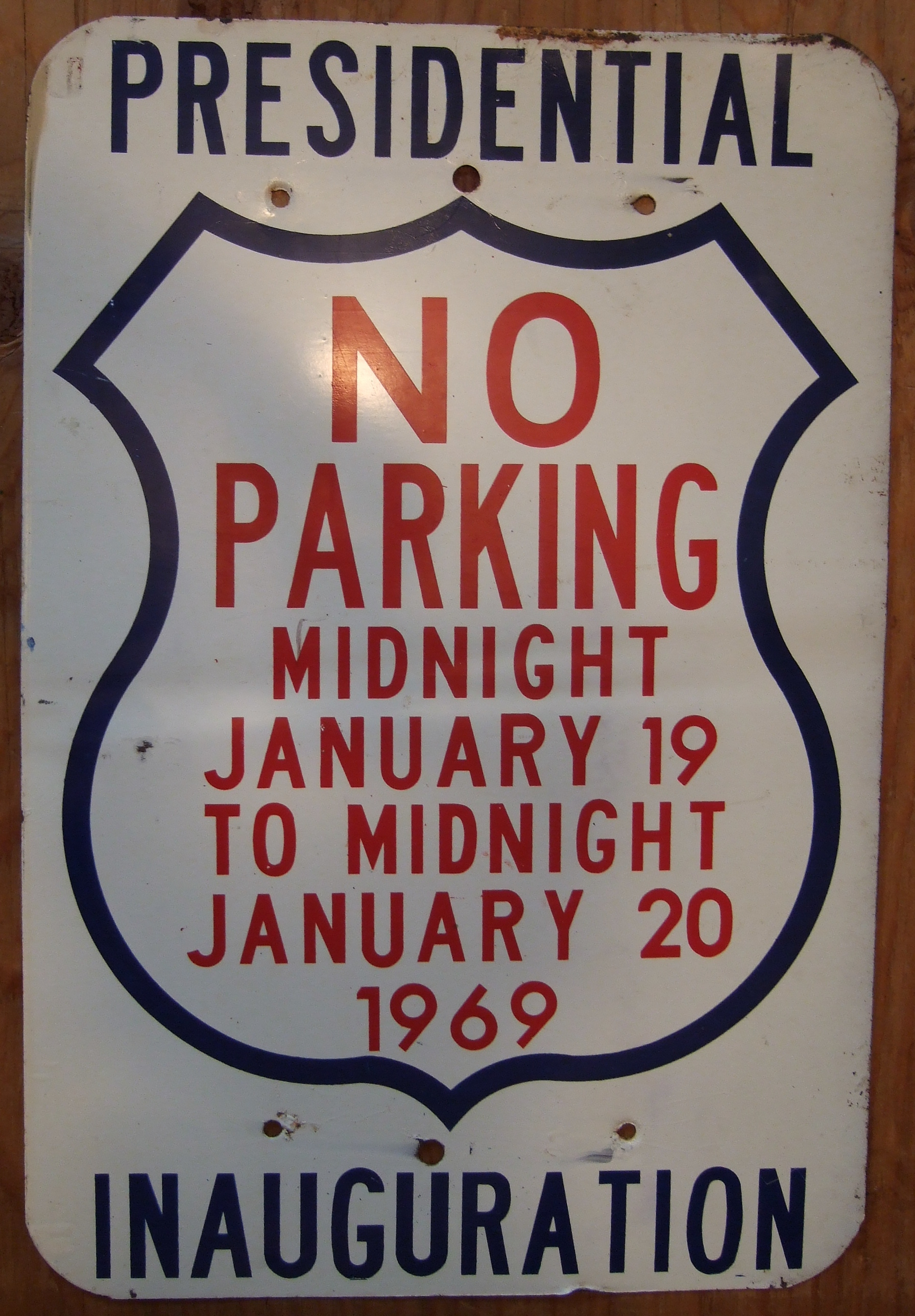
"No parking" sign from Richard Nixon's inauguration in 1969

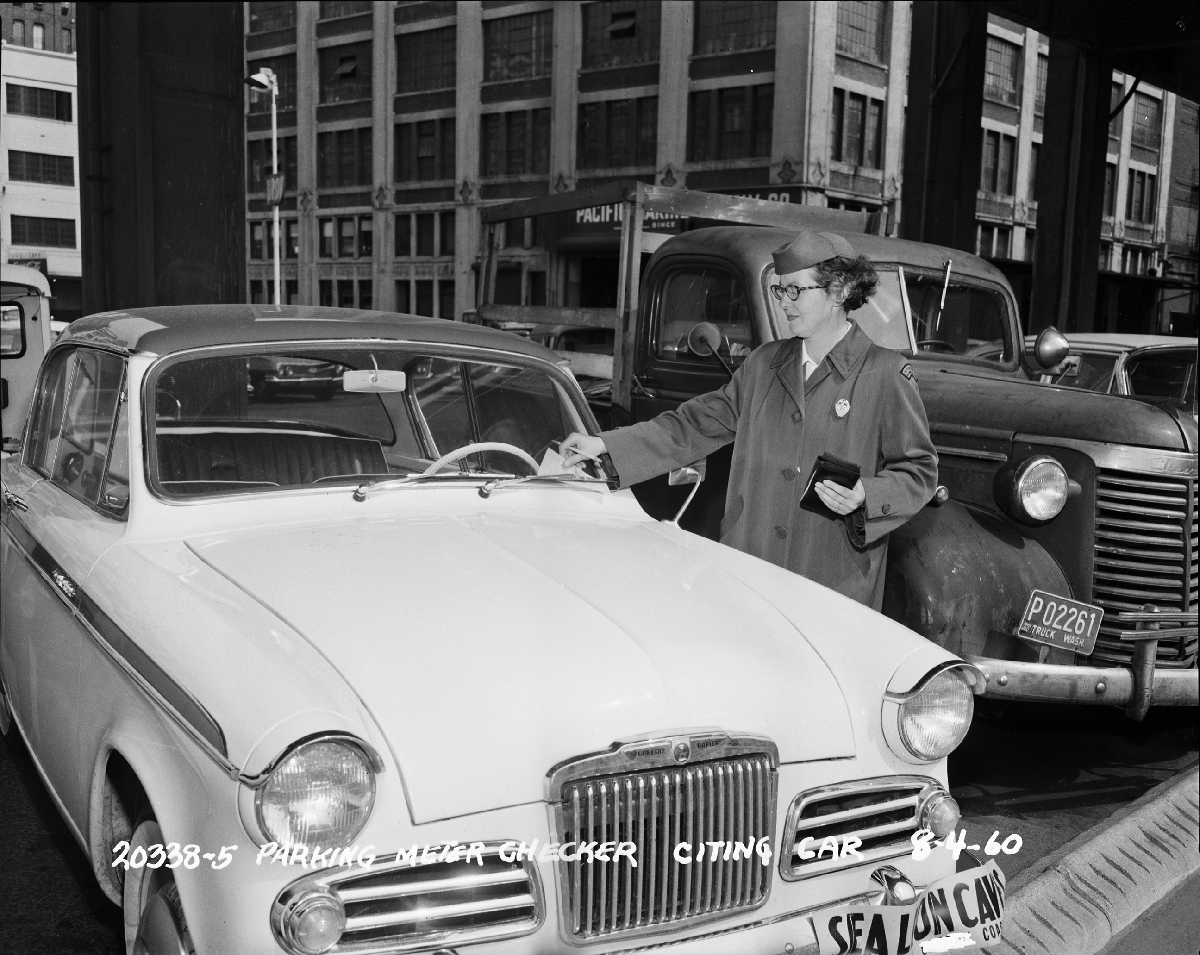
Checker giving a parking ticket, Seattle Washington, 1960

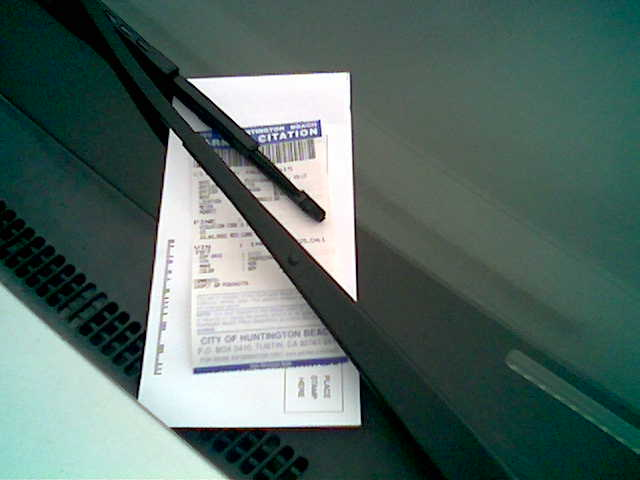
Placement of parking citation from Huntington Beach, California

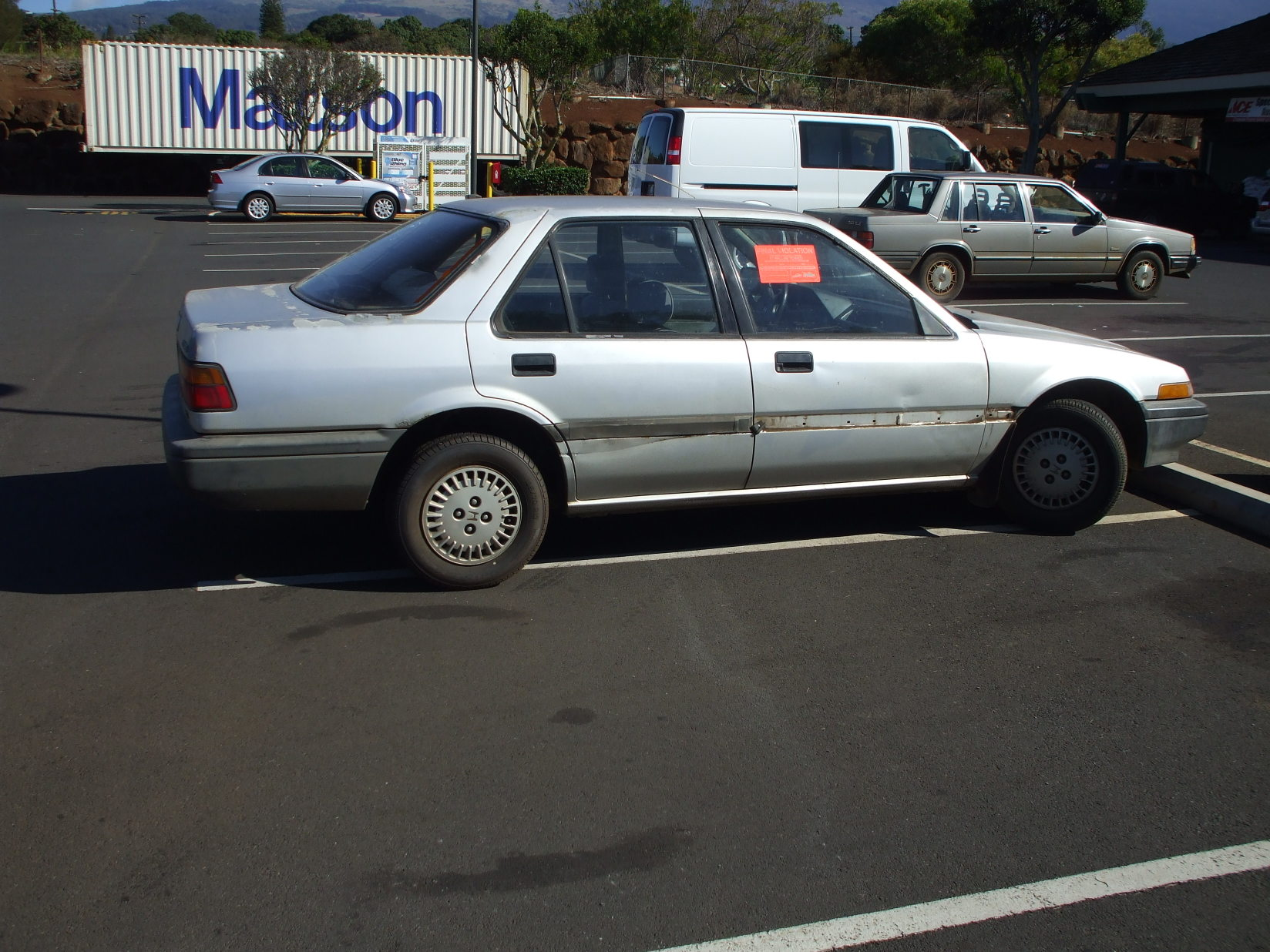
Late 80s Honda Accord with a sticker violation tag for illegal parking

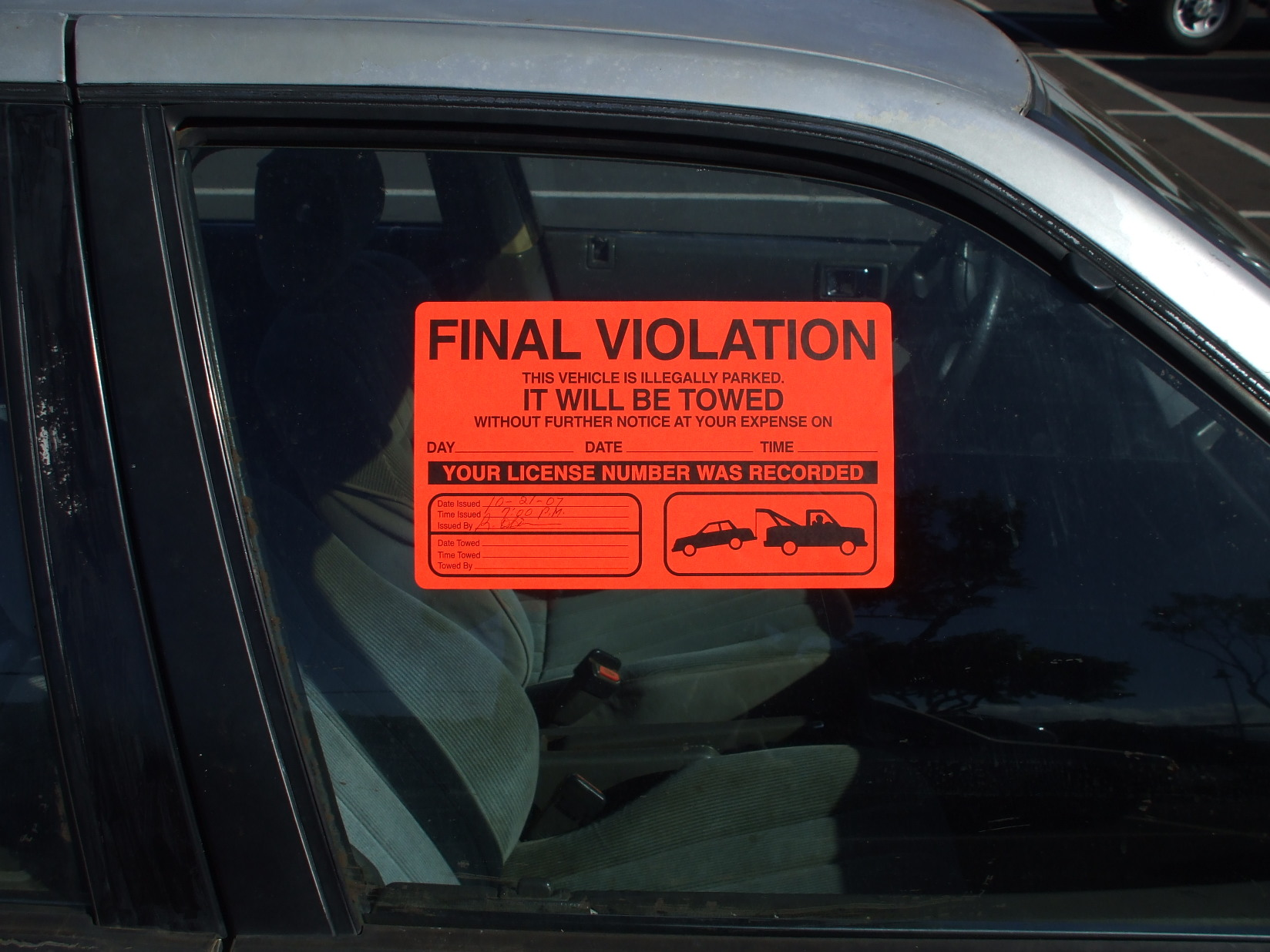
Closeup of sticker

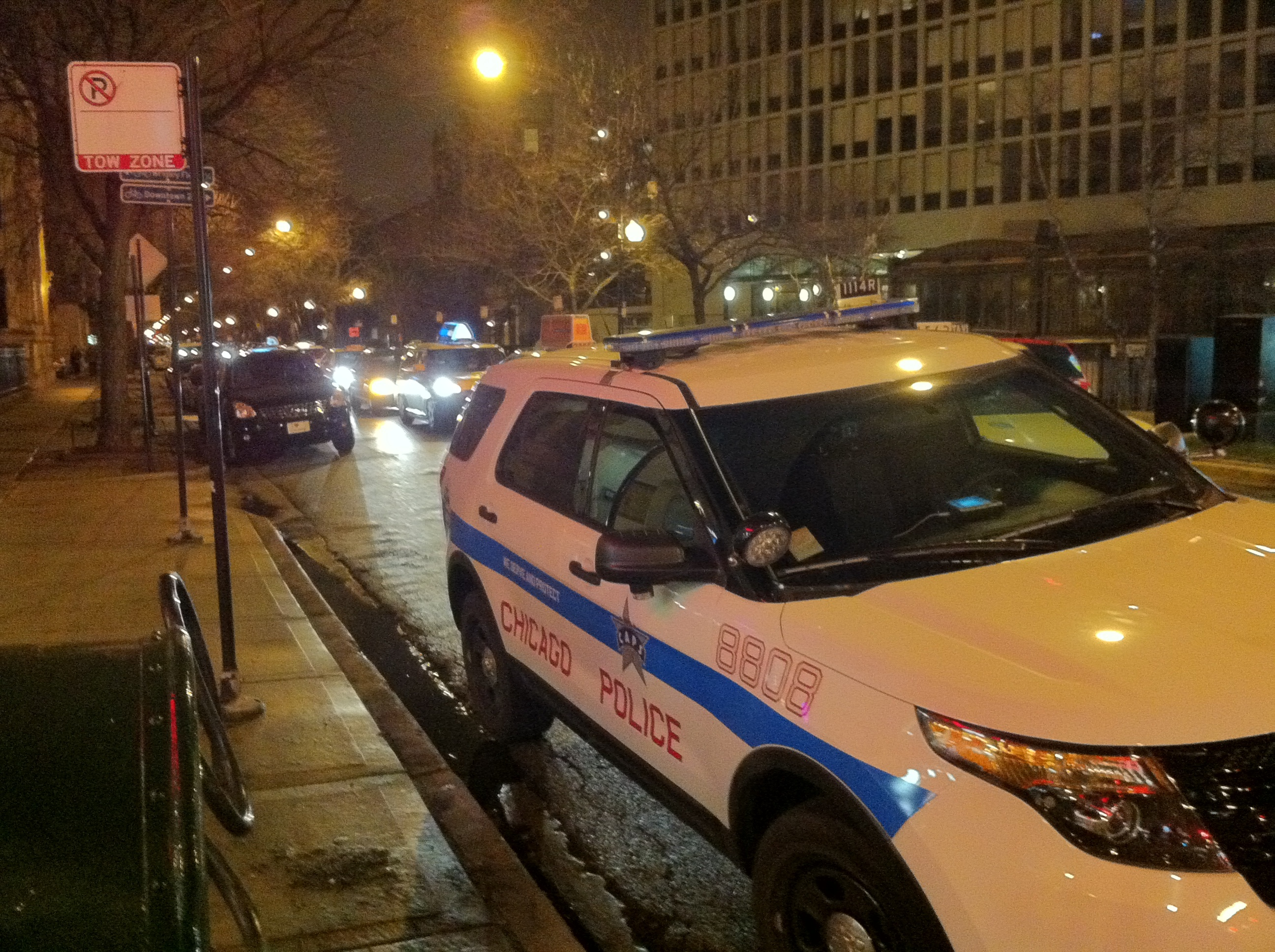
A Chicago Police Department squad parked in violation of a posted no-parking area. Police and government vehicles are often exempt from these restrictions if they are parked in relation to law enforcement activity.

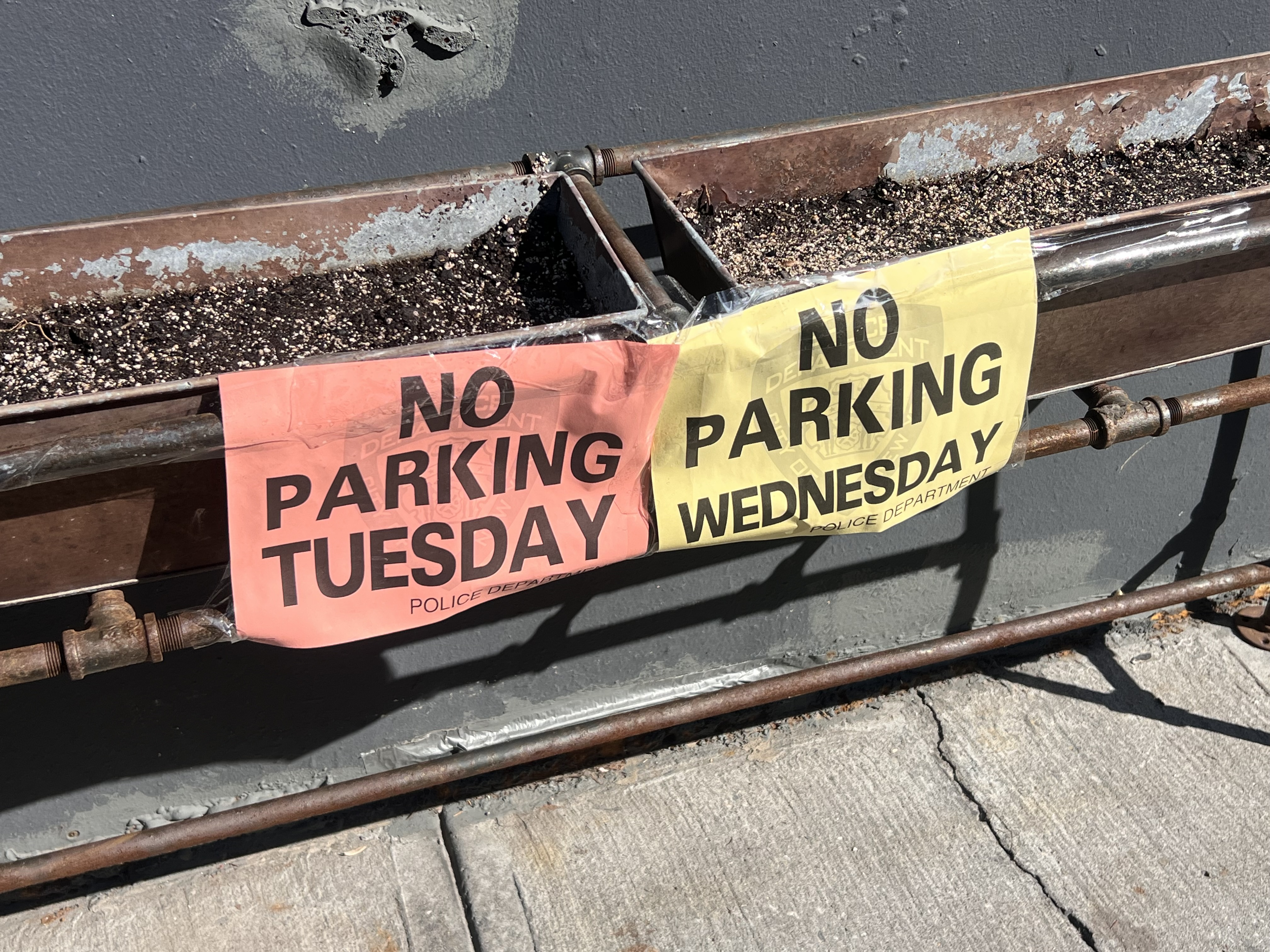
"No Parking" signs from the NYPD, printed on paper and secured with tape

== See also ==
- Overspill parking
- Predatory towing
- Traffic ticket
- Carwalking
