= Carwalking =

Act of walking across a stationary car

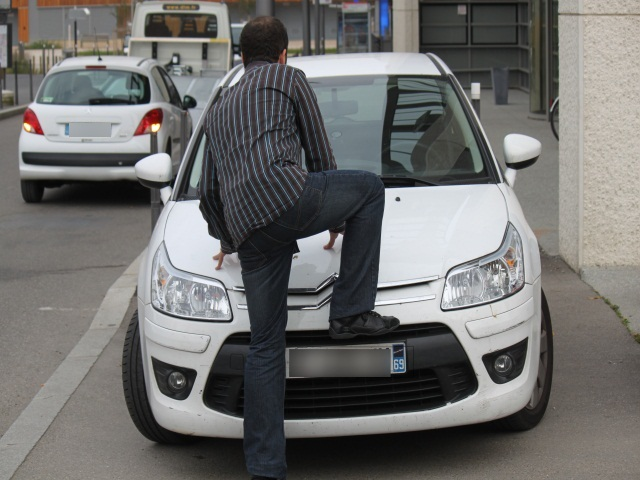
A pedestrian engaging in carwalking in Lyon, France.

Carwalking is the act of walking across a stationary car, often done in response to cars parked illegally in pedestrian areas. This can result in damage to the vehicle and is a form of protest against high motorization rates in urban areas.

== Reported cases ==
=== Germany ===
Michael Hartmann, a carwalker in Munich, Germany in the 1980s, gained fame for his act. During the peak of automobile-friendly policies in the 1970s and 1980s, urban areas saw a high number of illegally parked cars on sidewalks. In his book, Hartmann recounts an incident in 1988 when he and his girlfriend had to zigzag between parked cars on the sidewalk, prompting him to walk directly on top of the cars.

Hartmann led a group that climbed over parked cars and left signs saying, "I walked over your car because I didn't want to slide under it!"

=== France ===
In 2011, in Lyon, France, a German engineer named Peter Wagner walked on top of a car that was illegally parked on a sidewalk, blocking his path. The car's owner sued him for property damage, seeking 800 Euros for repairs. Wagner was initially ordered to pay 300 Euros but later appealed the decision, which was denied.

=== Mexico ===
In Mexico City, Peatónito, a mix of the Spanish words for pedestrian (peatón), and astonished (atónito), is a pedestrian activist known for walking over cars. Inspired by lucha libre, he wears a Mexican wrestler mask and cape, presenting himself as a superhero for pedestrians. The character is portrayed by Jorge Cáñez, a political scientist who worked for the city government as of 2015.

== See also ==
- Footpath encroachment
- Parking violation
- Sidewalk rage
- Walkability
- Cyclability
- Tread plate - to prevent damage when accessing roof rack via carwalking on bonnet
