= Sidewalk rage =

Aggressive behavior by a pedestrian on a sidewalk

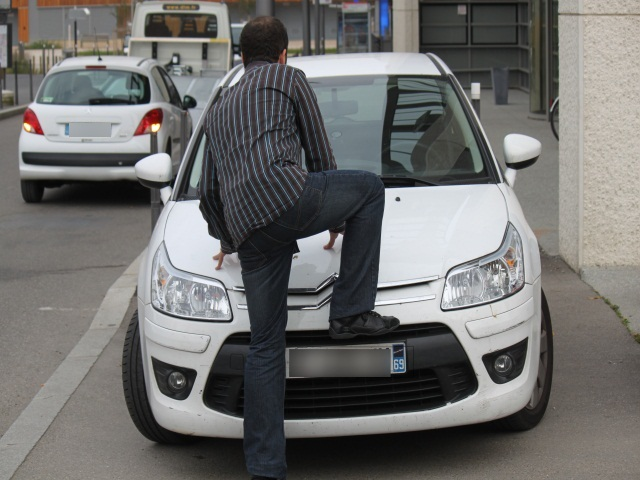
Carwalking, a form of pedestrian protest.

Sidewalk rage, also known as pedestrian rage or pedestrian aggressiveness syndrome, is aggressive behavior exhibited by pedestrians in crowded urban areas. It can be directed at other pedestrians, cyclists, or drivers, often triggered by slow walkers. See preferred walking speed.

== See also ==
- Bike rage, form of road rage involving cyclists
- Carwalking, act of walking across a stationary car
- Road rage, aggressive or angry behavior in road traffic
- Sidewalk cycling, controversial practice of riding bicycles on sidewalks or footpaths
