= Sit-lie ordinance =

Type of American municipal ordinance

In the United States, a sit-lie ordinance (also sometimes referred to as sit-lie law) is a municipal ordinance which prohibits sitting or lying on the sidewalk or in other public spaces.

Proponents argue that such ordinances are useful or necessary in keeping sidewalks free from obstruction, particularly for use by mobility-impaired people, and that they are a useful tool in fighting undesirable behavior, while opponents argue that they are instead veiled attacks on vagrants and homeless persons, and, further, unnecessary and overbroad.

Sit-lie ordinances are most notably found in West Coast cities, since the 2000s, with Seattle, Washington, Portland, Oregon, and several San Francisco Bay Area cities – Santa Cruz, Palo Alto, and San Francisco itself – having passed such ordinances.

In a 2009 survey of 235 US cities, 30% prohibited sitting or lying in some public places. A 2019 survey by the same organization reported results from 187 US cities, and found the proportion had increased to 55%.

== Proponents ==
Proponents claim that sit-lie ordinances are a tool to engage people and direct them to services such as restrooms, benches, and day shelters.

== Criticism ==
Critics argue that such ordinances are a criminalization of homelessness, a criminalization of ordinary activities – hence prone to selective enforcement – and unnecessary, since existing, narrowly targeted laws ban the undesirable activities such as aggressive begging, obstruction of sidewalks, loitering, and aggressive pursuit.

Certain aspects of some ordinances have been ruled overbroad; Portland's ordinance prohibited having possessions more than two feet from one's person, which was ruled unconstitutional by Judge Michael McShane in 2009, stating that he "found that an ordinary person would not understand from the statute that mundane and everyday behavior would be prohibited by the law," and that "the ordinance encourages arbitrary and discriminatory enforcement."

== History ==
=== Portland ===
Portland's most recent ordinance was enacted in 2007. After repeated legal challenges, the police ceased enforcing it and the law's sunset clause expired.

=== California ===
==== San Francisco ====
In San Francisco, a sit-lie ordinance was proposed in March 2010 by Mayor Gavin Newsom, but generated strong opposition under the banners of "Sidewalks Are for People" and "Stand Against Sit/Lie". It was placed on the November general election ballot as "Proposition L," and was approved by voters on November 2, 2010.

Based on the sit/lie ordinance, infractions peaked at 1,011 in 2013, but since that time they have steadily declined, falling to 114 in 2017, while misdemeanors tracked by SFPD spiked at 195 in 2016, then similarly declined by almost half the next year. SFPD's current policy focuses on steering homeless people to shelters, rather than arresting them (which is basically giving the suspect a ticket and a court date).

==== Los Angeles ====
In some jurisdictions, "sitting or lying in the public ways" is an offense.

=== Honolulu ===
In Honolulu, a sit-lie ordinance was signed into law in December 2014 by Mayor Kirk Caldwell. The initial ordinance applied to a number of pedestrian malls in the downtown and Chinatown neighborhoods and contains an exception for "people who are experiencing medical emergencies, engaged in expressive activity, working in maintenance or construction, or waiting in line unless their possessions impede the flow of pedestrian traffic." An extension to the sit-lie ban was vetoed later by Caldwell on May 21, 2015.

A 2015 study by graduate students at the University of Hawaii Department of Urban and Regional Planning surveyed 70 homeless individuals. Of the 70 interviewed, 54% reported having identification documents confiscated by the state. This would require them to pay a $200 retrieval fee unless they were able to obtain a fee waiver. The study authors concluded that the ordinance had little effect on homelessness.

In 2017, as part of a city campaign to clear city sidewalks of homeless encampments, Mayor Caldwell signed an expansion of the sit-lie ordinance to an additional 13 areas of Honolulu County (Oahu).

== See also ==
- Homelessness in the United States
- Discrimination against the homeless
- Anti-homelessness legislation
- List of organizations opposing homelessness
- Hostile architecture
- Camden bench
- Homeless dumping
- Skid row
- Black triangle (badge)
