= Anti-homelessness legislation =

Laws regarding homelessness

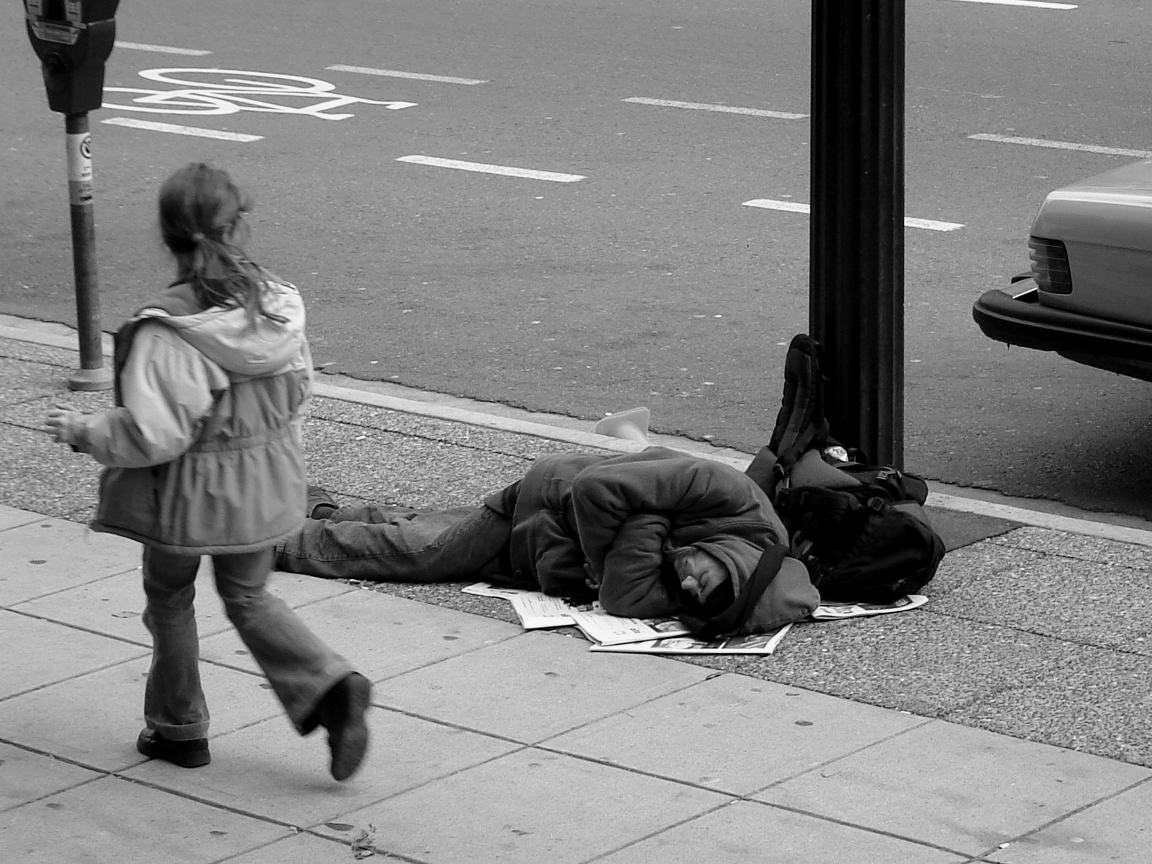
A man sleeps on the street.

Anti-homelessness legislation can take two forms: legislation that aims to help and re-house homeless people; and legislation that is intended to send homeless people to homeless shelters compulsorily, or to criminalize homelessness and begging.

== International law ==
Since the publication of the Universal Declaration of Human Rights (Charter of the United Nations – UN) in 1948, the public perception has been increasingly changing to a focus on the human right to housing, travel and migration as a part of individual self-determination rather than the human condition. The Declaration, an international law reinforcement of the Nuremberg Trial Judgements, upholds the rights of one nation to intervene in the affairs of another if said nation is abusing its citizens, and rose out of a 1939–1945 World War II Atlantic environment of extreme split between "haves" and "have nots." Article 6 of the 1998 Declaration of Human Duties and Responsibilities declares that members of the global community have individual and collective duties and responsibilities to take appropriate action to prevent the commission of gross or systematic human rights abuses. The modern study of homeless phenomena is most frequently seen in this historical context.

== Laws regarding homeless people ==
Some laws about homeless people say the state should support or house homeless people.

=== United Kingdom ===
The 1834 Poor Law Amendment Act required parish unions to supply houses for workers but these unions purposely made these work houses unattractive in order to discourage workers from applying for housing. This Act also made casual wards known as "spikes" available for those who needed temporary housing in return for their labor. It was estimated that approximately 30,000 to 80,000 people used the spikes in the early 1900s in Great Britain.

Under the Homeless Reduction Act 2017 unhoused persons should be able to access assistance from their council. Councils also must work to prevent people from becoming unhoused, and families with children will still be housed by councils.

Part 7 of the Housing Act 1996 provides action to prevent homelessness and also to provide assistance to those who are threatened with homelessness.

==== Wales ====
In 2014, a law was implicated which means that the councils must attempt to stop people becoming homeless in the first place. Prior to this law, councils only had to assist unhoused persons labelled under 'priority', which included mostly families with young children.

According to the charity Crisis, this law has increased council efficiency via more proficient services, including fewer families being placed into expensive emergency accommodation.

==== Scotland ====
The Homelessness etc. (Scotland) Act 2003 was legislation passed by the Scottish Parliament that set the goal of providing permanent residence to those deemed unintentionally homeless. Following, the Homeless Persons (Unsuitable Accommodation) (Scotland) Order 2004 was passed in 2004. This order made it so that, unless exceptional circumstances were present, any familial unit including children or an expectant mother was not placed in "unsuitable temporary housing". Scotland's most recent anti-homelessness legislation is entitled The Housing Support Services (Homelessness)(Scotland) Regulations 2012, and it came into full effect on June 1, 2013. These regulations require local authorities to assist homeless people in a variety of ways, including help in adjusting to a new living situation, debt counseling and managing a personal budget.

Since 2012, Scotland have gained some of the strongest homelessness rights in the world. This is as a result of the insertion of having no distinction between the idea of 'priority' and 'non-priority' homeless, this creates an opportunity for anyone houseless to be entitled to at least temporary, and usually permanent accommodation.

=== United States ===
The 1987 McKinney–Vento Homeless Assistance Act: A change created by the amendments of 1992 was the creation of the Access to Community Care and Effective Services and Support program (or ACCESS); this program was created in order to assist the homeless people who had both serious mental illness issues, as well as substance abuse problems and lasted a total of 5 years.

The Fair Housing Act passed in 1968 was designed to protect those who were traditionally discriminated against by housing agencies because of their race, gender, religion, familial status, and disability. Some states and cities also gave homeless people equal access to housing accommodations regardless of their income. Although this Act did not specifically refer to the homeless population, the main beneficiaries of this law were homeless individuals.

The Americans with Disabilities Act of 1990, also known as the ADA states that people with disabilities must be given appropriate housing accommodations that meet their special needs. Additionally, people with disabilities should be given the chance to interact with people who do not have disability.

== Laws criminalizing behaviors engaged in by homeless people ==
Laws that criminalize homeless people generally take on one of five forms:

- Restricting the public areas in which sitting or sleeping are allowed
- Enhancing laws on trespassing
- Removing homeless people from particular areas
- Prohibiting begging
- Selective enforcement of laws
- Selective creation of laws (The French novelist Anatole France noted this phenomenon as long ago as 1894, observing that "the law in its majestic equality forbids the rich as well as the poor to sleep under bridges".)

=== England and Wales ===
The 1977 Housing (Homeless Persons) Act greatly restricted requirements for housing homeless people so that only individuals who were affected by natural disasters could receive housing accommodations from the local authorities. This led to the rejection of the majority of homeless applications received by the local government. This Act also made it difficult for homeless individuals without children to receive accommodations provided by local authorities.

Rough sleeping was a criminal offence under Vagrancy Act 1824, repealed in June 2026. In the last years prior to repeal this law was primarily used to move individuals without formal caution or arrest.

=== United States ===
Homeless people find it harder to secure employment, housing, or federal benefits with a criminal record, and therefore penalizing the act of being homeless makes exiting such a situation much more difficult. They may face potential legal repercussions such as fines and jail time for seeking shelter in vehicles (Tennessee) and "loitering". Although the court's opinion in Jones v. City of Los Angeles (see above) was vacated, the result suggests that criminalizing homelessness may be unconstitutional. Similarly, in response to growing reports of hate crimes, some state governments have proposed the addition of "people experiencing homelessness" to their hate-crimes statutes.

One study in Colorado examined a common justification for anti-homelessness laws – that a "tough love" approach ultimately increased the death and suicide rate of the homeless population – and found that the homeless reported worse quality of life due to the laws. Another study in California found that people experiencing extreme poverty face apathy, disrespect, and discrimination from police enforcing anti-homelessness laws, resulting in a reluctance to seek services and to engage with outreach when offered.

Many municipalities in the US make it a crime to provide food or shelter to homeless people, with many more attempting to make it illegal for homeless people themselves to use tents or blankets while sheltering outside, or to use soap in public showers.

=== Europe ===
The European Court of Human Rights ruled that an anti-begging ordinance in Geneva violated human rights in the 2021 Lăcătuș v. Switzerland case. The plaintiff was from the Romani people in Romania and had been fined more than 400 euros for begging.

=== Hungary ===
Hungary criminalizes homelessness and is addressed in its constitution, which is seen as part of a broader illiberal governance in the country. Sleeping in a public space is illegal and violators can be fined or jailed. One study found that the criminalization of homelessness increased tolerance for extralegal violence against homeless individuals.

== Anti-homeless architecture ==
Anti-homeless architecture is an urban design strategy that is intended to discourage loitering, camping, and sleeping in public. While this policy does not explicitly target homeless people, it restricts the ways in which people can use public spaces, which affects the homeless population.

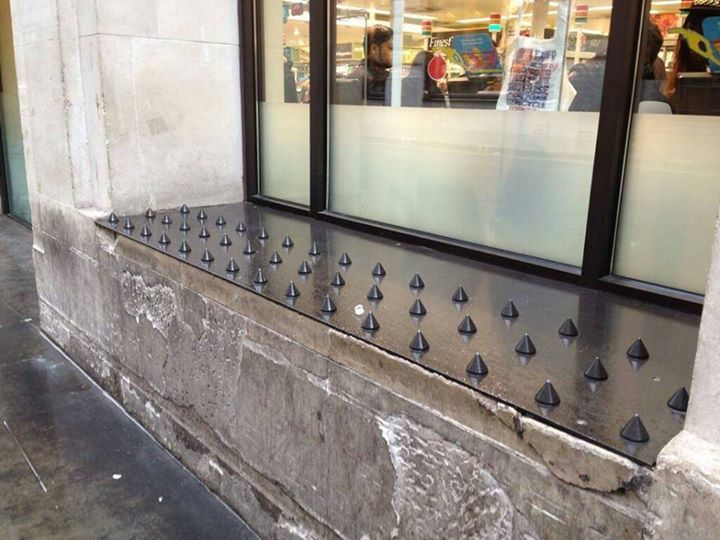
Anti-homeless spikes on a shop ledge.

This strategy can take many forms, including:

- Reducing the number of sitting areas in public spaces
- Installing bolts and spikes in flat surfaces in order to make sleeping on them uncomfortable
- Installing dividers on metal benches to prevent sleeping
- Metal teeth and bars on ledges to prevent sitting
- Boulders placed in parks to prevent homeless encampments

These forms of architecture are also referred to as hostile architecture. They can make life for the homeless more difficult as they modify public spaces that would otherwise be accessible. Arguments are put forward that the resources spent on the upkeep and design of hostile architecture should instead be spent on addressing the root causes of homelessness.

The Oregon Department of Transportation placed large boulders in several locations to discourage illegal camping near freeways. Anti-homeless spikes were installed in London, England, and New York City in order to make homeless activity more difficult. Anti-homeless architecture is a common tactic in major cities. Local governments often employ anti-homeless architecture practices following complaints from local business owners as the presence of homeless individuals lowers property prices and discourages business traffic.

Critics of anti-homeless architecture claim that it targets an already vulnerable population, and that it hides the effects of homelessness, rather than meaningfully addressing it.

== Perception of homelessness and policy implications ==
=== United States ===
The authors of a 2017 study on homelessness stated that homeless people have a higher incidence of sickness, with their most common health problem being skin problems. Homeless people also have a lack of access to sanitation, leading to poor hygiene. These characteristics are noticeable and may trigger reactions of disgust from onlookers. This leads the general public to keep their physical distance from homeless people, and promotes exclusionary policies. As an example, these authors state that while the majority of the general public support subsidized housing for homeless individuals, they do not want that housing in their own neighborhood.

But the public also maintains concern for homeless people, supporting increases in federal spending on homelessness programs. In fact, when surveyed, the public supports spending on homelessness over other social problems by consistently putting homeless people in the top third of their spending priorities.

Respondents to surveys also feel that 55% of homeless people are addicted to drugs or alcohol, and that 45% of homeless people have been to jail before. The majority of U.S. residents surveyed also think that homeless people make neighborhood worse, and that their presence brings down the profitability of local businesses.

== See also ==
- Begging § Legal restrictions
- Criminalization
- Discrimination against homeless people
- Food Not Bombs § 2011 Florida feeding bans
- Homelessness
- Housing First
- Sit-lie ordinance
- Vagrancy law
