= Tread plate =

Metal stock type

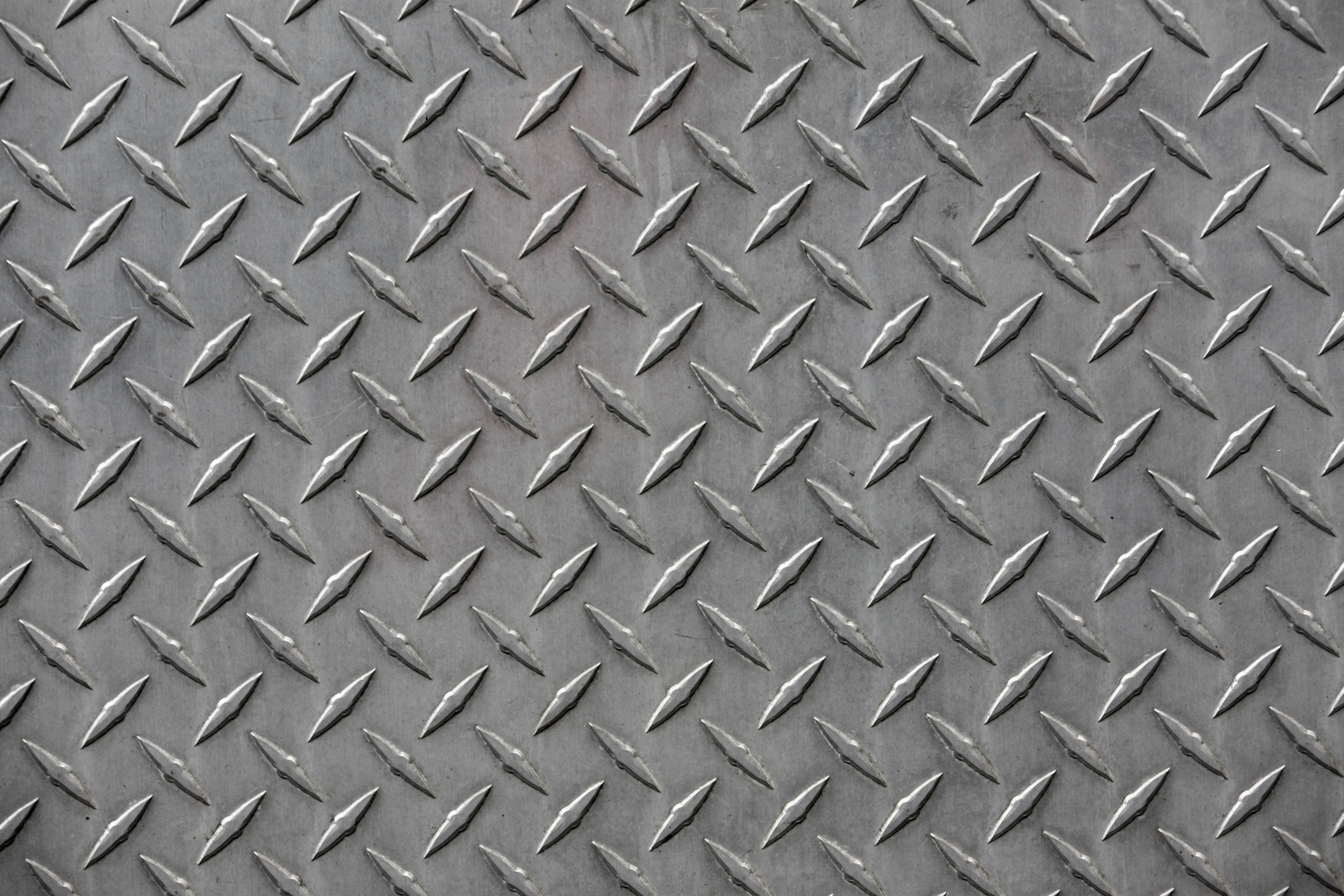
Part of a diamond plate

Tread plate, also known as checker plate, wrestling steps and diamond plate, is a type of metal stock with a regular pattern or lines on one side for slip resistance. Diamond plate is usually steel, stainless steel or aluminium. Steel types are normally made by hot rolling, although modern manufacturers also make a raised and pressed diamond design. The most common alloy used for aluminium tread plate is 6061, although 5086-H34 and 3003-H231 are also used.

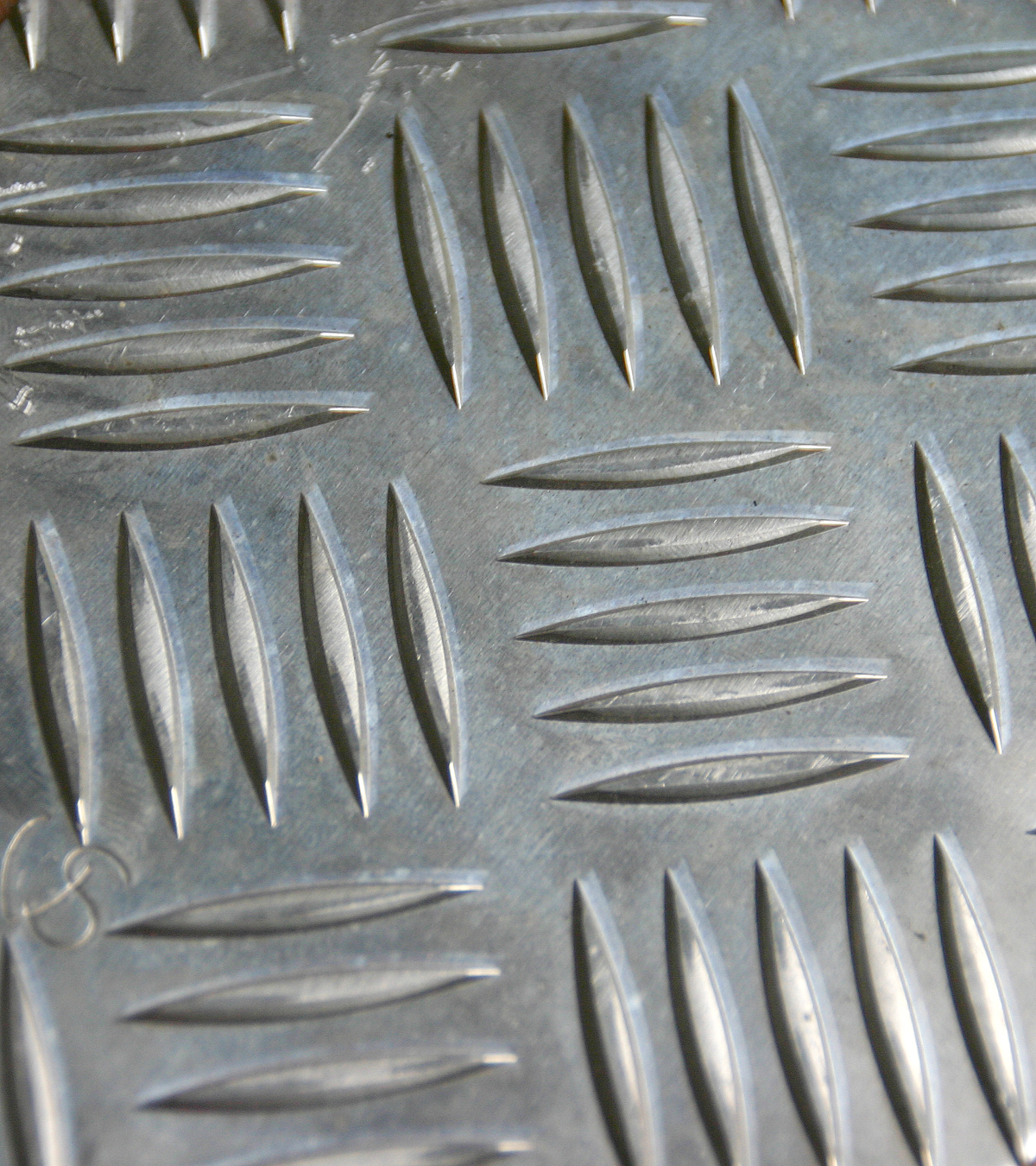
Five-bar tread plate

The added texture reduces the risk of slipping, making diamond plate a solution for stairs, catwalks, walkways, and ramps in industrial settings. Its non-skid properties mean that diamond plate is frequently used on the interior of ambulances and on the footplates of firetrucks. Additional applications include truck beds and trailer floors or on car bonnets to assist with access to roof rack, without damage from carwalking.

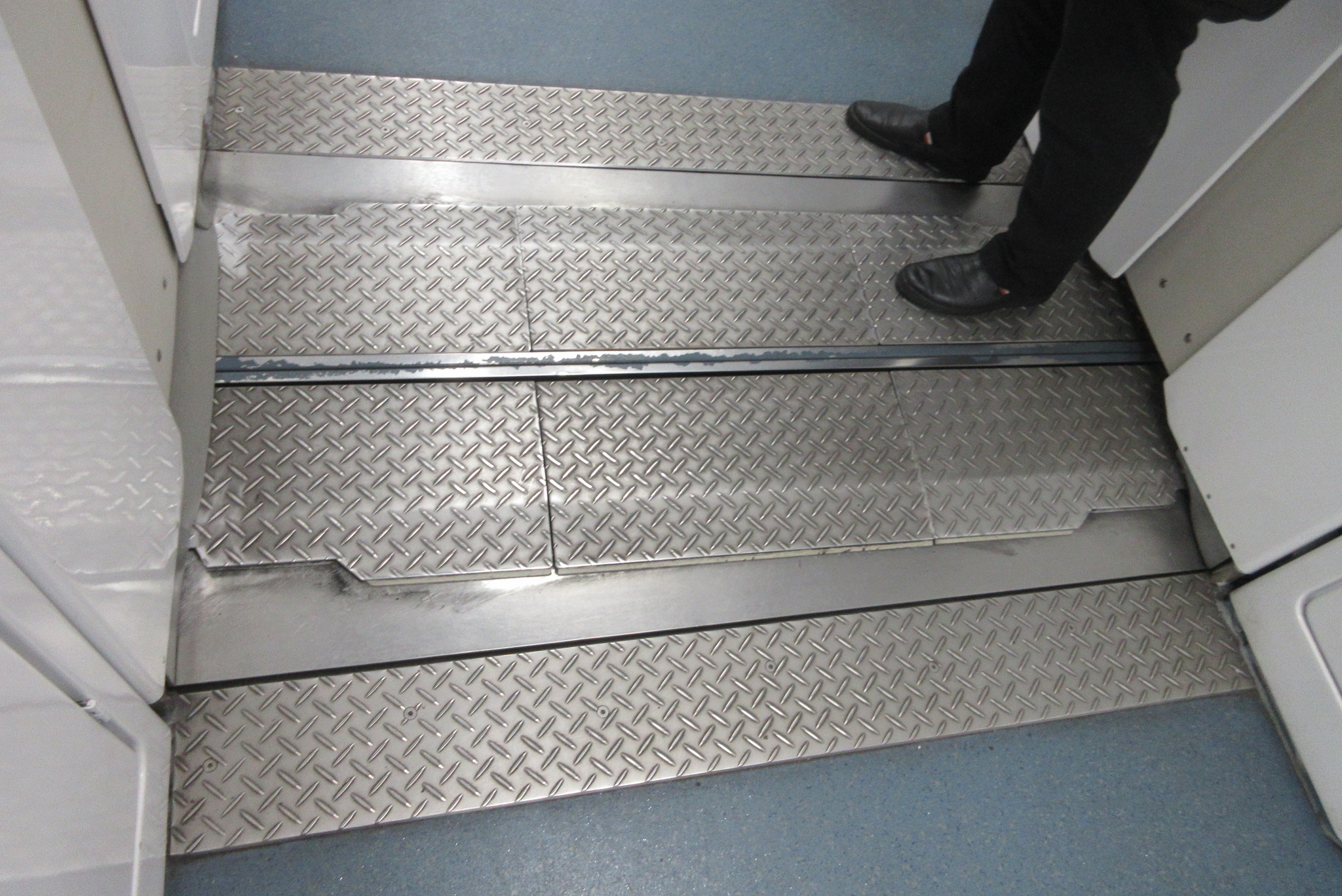
Use in mass transit showing scale of the pattern

Tread plate can also be used decoratively, particularly highly polished aluminium variants. Manufactured in plastic, diamond plate is marketed as an interlocking tile system to be installed on garage floors, trailers, and exercise rooms.

== See also ==
- Structural steel
- Embossing (manufacturing)
