= Aggressive driving =

Type of illegal driving

Aggressive driving is defined by the National Highway Traffic Safety Administration as the behavior of an individual who "Commits a combination of moving traffic offenses so as to endanger other persons or property."

== Definitions ==
In the UK, Road Drivers offers a basic definition of aggressive driving:

Aggressive driving: The use of a motor vehicle in a deliberate and aggressive manner that is likely to endanger life by increasing the risk of a collision". This behaviour is usually motivated by impatience, annoyance, hostility or an attempt to save time.

— Road Drivers

There are other alternative definitions:

Aggressive driving behavior takes many forms. Typical aggressive driving behaviors include speeding, driving too close to the car in front, not respecting traffic regulations, improper lane changing or weaving, etc. The list is long. Most people drive aggressively from time to time and many drivers are not even aware when they are doing it.

Aggressive driving is difficult to define because of its many different manifestations but having a clear definition is important for police and legal action against it to succeed. A Global Web Conference on Aggressive Driving Issues organized in Canada in October 2000 offered the following definition “A driving behavior is aggressive if it is deliberate, likely to increase the risk of collision and is motivated by impatience, annoyance, hostility and/or an attempt to save time.

— Aggressive driving behavior (background paper) Fourth Road Safety Week (5 - 11 April 2004)

== Behaviours associated ==
By definition, aggressive driving is 'committing unprovoked attacks on other drivers', attacks such as not yielding to vehicles wishing to pass. The U.S. National Highway Traffic Safety Administration (NHTSA) has implemented the Fatality Analysis Reporting System, which identifies actions that would fall under the category of aggressive driving, including:

- Following improperly / tailgating
- Improper or erratic lane changing
- Illegal driving on a road shoulder, in a ditch, or on a sidewalk or median
- Passing where prohibited
- Operating the vehicle in an erratic, reckless, careless, or negligent manner or suddenly changing speeds without changing lanes
- Failure to yield right of way
- Failure to obey traffic signs, traffic control devices, or traffic officers, failure to observe safety zone traffic laws
- Failure to observe warnings or instructions on vehicle displaying them
- Failure to signal
- Driving too fast for conditions
- Racing
- Making an improper turn
- Close following and sudden braking.

Aggressive driving and bumper stickers have been found to correlate as cars which commit traffic violations while having divisive bumper stickers connecting to their political views or party of choice have resulted in increased aggressive behavior such as honking from those around them.

It has also been theorized that a lack of respect for authority has also led to an increase in aggressive driving. Romania which in 2013 had 9.3 road deaths per 100,000 people which was significantly higher than other nations such as the United Kingdom with 2.8 road deaths per 100,000 people. The increase in deaths for Romania correlated with its poor ranking in the World Justice Project from that year.

== Effects ==
According to the Fatality Analysis Reporting System, aggressive driving played a role in 56% of fatal crashes between 2003 and 2007, most of which were attributed to excessive speed. Aggressive driving also negatively impacts the environment as it burns 37% more fuel and produces more toxic fumes.

Aggressive driving also emits more CO_{2} than a calmer approach with increased CO_{2} emissions of 37% and CO emissions of 88%. The increases are a result of constant shifting from accelerating to decelerating, which uses up more of the cars fuel and overall, more exhaust emissions. Calm driving alone would save nearly half a billion tonnes of carbon dioxide by 2050 in China.

== Solutions ==
Prevention of aggressive driving is possible through attainable goals such as increased legal penalties against offenders, proper education for new and veteran drivers about aggressive driving, and changes in driving structures to combat road congestion.

Adjustments to road infrastructure have also shown to significantly decrease aggressive driving. Curved roads and transition curves show significant decreases in aggressive behavior as drivers are forced to adapt and slow down to avoid crashing.

== See also ==
- Bike rage
- Brake test
- Car chase
- Carjacking
- Drive-by shooting
- Jaywalking
- Joyride
- Motor vehicle theft
- Road rage
- Street racing
- Stolen vehicle recovery
- Tailgating
- Traffic stop
- Traffic ticket
- Vehicle tracking system
- Legal terms related to aggressive driving:
  - Reckless driving in United States law
  - Dangerous driving in United Kingdom law
  - Driving without due care and attention, legal term in the United States, Ontario in Canada, the United Kingdom, and Ireland
