= Embossing (manufacturing) =

Metalworking process for producing designs in sheet metal

Sheet metal embossing is a metalworking process for producing raised or recessed designs, or relief, in sheet metal. In contrast to coining (which uses unmatched dies), embossing uses matched male and female dies to achieve the pattern, either by stamping, or by passing a sheet or strip of metal between patterned rollers. It is often combined with foil stamping to create a shiny, 3D effect. Embossing techniques are often used in sculpture, wall art and jewelry

== Process ==
Embossing is accomplished through a combination of heat and pressure on the sheet metal.

Metal sheet is drawn through the male (raised pattern) and female (recessed pattern) roller dies, producing a pattern or design on the metal sheet. Depending on the roller dies used, different patterns can be produced on the metal sheet. The pressure and a combination of heat "irons" while raising the level of the image higher than the substrate to make it smooth. The term "impressing" refers to an image lowered into the surface of a material, in distinction to an image raised out of the surface of a material.

In most of the pressure embossing operation machines, the upper roll blocks are stationary, while the bottom roll blocks are movable. The pressure with which the bottom roll is raised is referred to as the tonnage capacity.

Embossing machines are generally sized to give 2 inches (5 cm) of strip clearance on each side of an engraved embossing roll. Many embossing machines are custom-manufactured, so there are no industry-standard widths. It is not uncommon to find embossing machines in operation producing patterns less than 6 inches (15 cm) wide all the way up to machines producing patterns 70 inches (180 cm) wide or more.

There are multiple types of embossing machines. Manual embossers are used as low-cost, small scale options, whereas automatic embossing machines can be used to emboss many pieces of metal effectively at a higher cost. Metal tag embossing machines also exist to mark objects in industrial environments that are prone to wear.

== Characteristics ==
The metal embossing manufacturing process has these characteristics:

- The ability to form ductile metals without cracking.
- Use in medium to high production runs.
- The ability to maintain the same metal thickness before and after embossing.
- The ability to produce unlimited patterns, depending on the roll dies.
- The ability to reproduce the product with no variation.

== Commonly used materials ==
The following materials are suitable for embossing:

- Aluminium (all alloys)
- Aluminium (T1/T2)
- Brass
- Cold rolled steel
- Copper
- Galvanized steel
- Gold
- High strength, low alloy, steel
- Hot rolled steel
- Steel (all alloys)
- Zinc

== See also ==
- Diamond plate
- Repoussé and chasing
- Paper embossing
