= Road rage =

Aggressive or angry behavior in road traffic

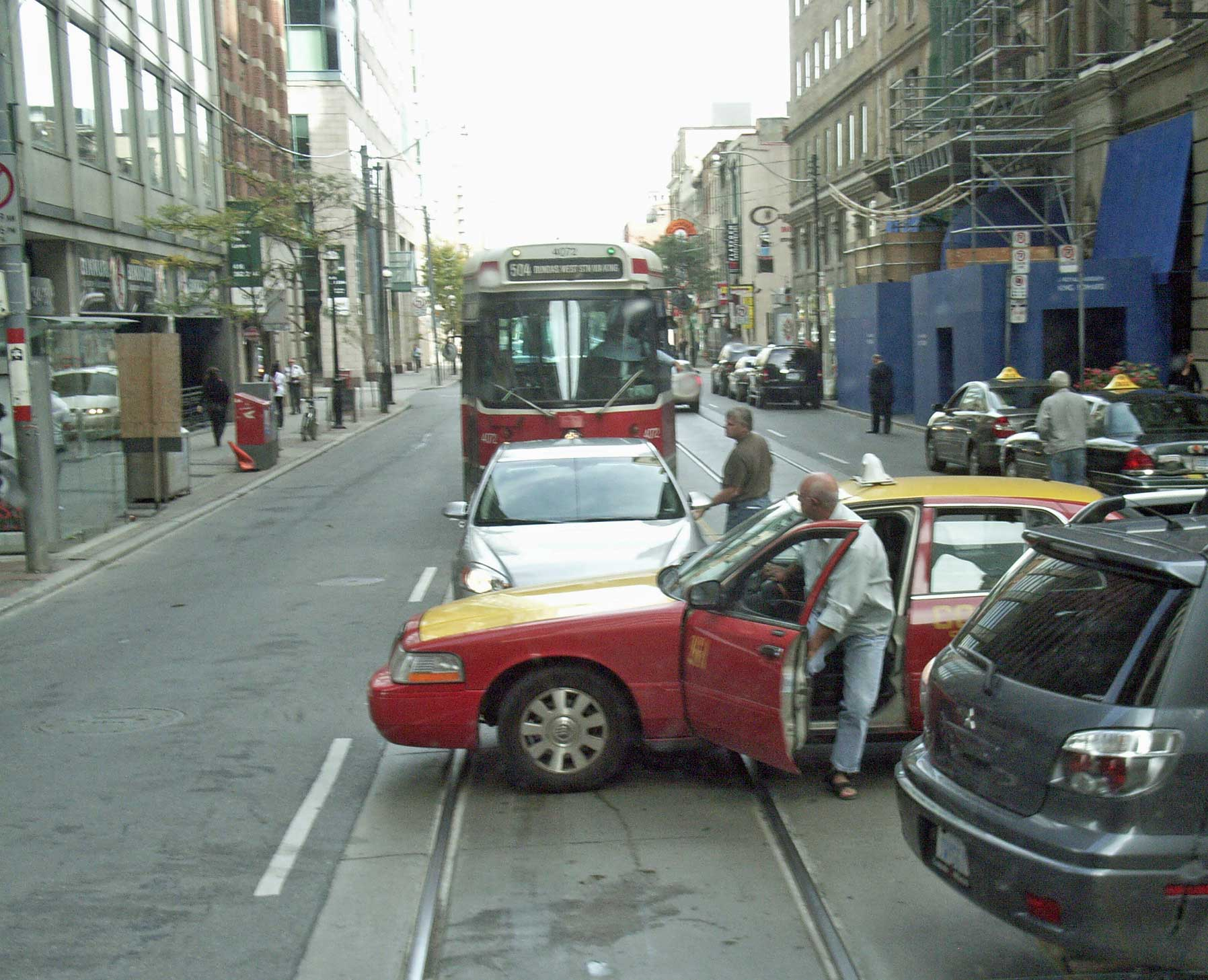
Two drivers emerging from their cars to express anger at a road situation in Toronto, Canada

Road rage is aggressive or angry behavior exhibited by people driving a vehicle. These behaviors include rude and verbal insults, yelling, physical threats or dangerous driving methods targeted at other drivers, pedestrians, or cyclists in an effort to intimidate or release frustration. Road rage can lead to altercations, damage to property, assaults, and collisions that result in serious physical injuries or even death. Behaviour has included (but is not limited to) cutting motorists off, inappropriate honking, flashing headlights, directing obscene gestures at another driver, swerving, tailgating, brake checking, and physical confrontation.

According to a study by the AAA Foundation for Traffic Safety that examined police records nationally, there were more than 1,250 incidents of road rage on average reported per year between 1990–1996 in the United States. Many of these incidents have ended with serious injuries or fatalities. These rates rose each year throughout the six years of the study. As of 2010, a number of studies have found that individuals with road rage are predominantly young (33 years old on average) and 96.6% male.

== Legal status ==
In some jurisdictions, there can be a legal difference between "road rage" and "aggressive driving." In the U.S., only a few states have enacted special aggressive driving laws, where road rage cases are normally prosecuted as assault and battery (with or without a vehicle), or as vehicular homicide.

The legal definition of road rage encompasses a group of behaviors expressed while driving, or stemming from traffic-related incidents. The U.S. National Highway Traffic Safety Administration defines road rage as when "an intentional assault by a driver or passenger with a motor vehicle or a weapon that occurs on the roadway or is precipitated by an incident on the roadway." This definition makes the distinction that aggressive driving is a traffic violation and that road rage is a criminal offense.

== Types ==
Road rage can include:

- Shouting, excessive use of a horn or obscene gestures and threats.
- Actions such as cutting off another vehicle, driving closely, blocking another vehicle so that it can not use a traffic lane, brake checking, chasing another vehicle or running it off the road, or deliberately slamming into a vehicle.
- Stopping a vehicle on the side or in the middle of the road, exiting the vehicle to threaten, attack, fight, or injure another motorist, passenger, pedestrian, bicyclist, or any other person.

=== Shootings ===
Road rage shootings, being instances of road rage in which a gun is fired, are typically impulsive events in which participant(s) in a road rage incident already had a gun in their car or on their person. In the United States, a person was shot in a road rage incident every 18 hours in 2023 based on data from the Gun Violence Archive (GVA), which relies on police reports and news coverage.

== Effects on drivers ==
A stressed driver's behavior depends on that driver's coping abilities. Driving presents many stresses because of high speeds and the actions of other drivers. As stress increases, the likelihood of a person exhibiting road rage increases dramatically. Typically, younger males are most susceptible to road rage. Most reported cases of road rage occur because of cutting in and out of traffic, lane changes, disputes over parking spots or rude gestures. A report found that 6.8% of selected road rage incidents result in death.

According to one study, people who customize their cars with stickers and other adornments are more prone to road rage. In the study, the number of territory markers predicted road rage better than did vehicle value or condition. Only the number of bumper stickers, not their content, predicted road rage.

Common targets of road rage are driving instructors and learner drivers; as these road users tend to follow road regulations very closely, with learners prone to making more mistakes, they are often antagonized by aggressive drivers. In 2019, a survey by British insurance provider Young Marmalade found that 77% of driving instructors face regular abuse and intimidation from other road users while teaching students, and that 8% of learner drivers have abandoned learning to drive as a result of road rage they have experienced.

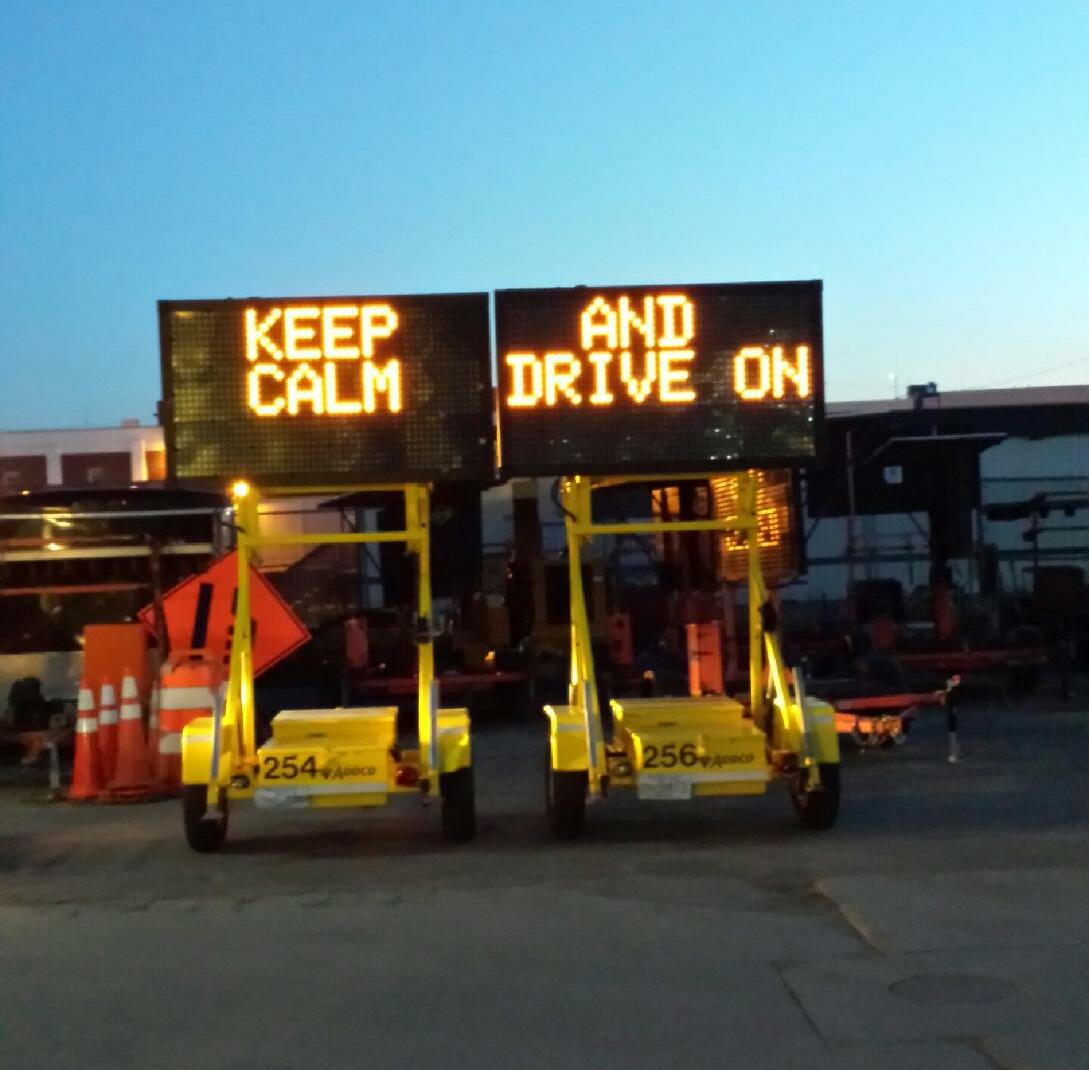
An electronic road sign in Massachusetts, discouraging road rage

Road rage is not an official mental disorder recognized in the Diagnostic and Statistical Manual of Mental Disorders (DSM). However, according to an article published by the Associated Press in June 2006, the behaviors typically associated with road rage can be the result of a disorder known as intermittent explosive disorder that is recognized in the DSM. This conclusion was drawn from surveys of 9,200 adults in the United States between 2001 and 2003. The surveys were funded by the National Institute of Mental Health.

== Penalties ==
Road rage is a potentially serious act, and it may be seen as an endangerment of public safety. However, it is not always possible to judge intent by observation, so "road ragers" who are stopped by police may be charged with other offenses such as careless or reckless driving, or may be fined or arrested. Some consider road ragers to be criminals.

=== Australia ===
In New South Wales, Australia, road rage is considered an extremely serious act. Any person who "engages in a course of conduct that causes or threatens an impact involving the other vehicle" while intending to cause a person bodily harm can be charged with predatory driving, a serious offence that can send the culprit to jail for up to five years. Offenders can also be fined A$100,000 and disqualified from driving, regardless of intent to physically harm the victim. If the predatory driving results in physical assault or harm, and/or the victim's car is intentionally damaged, penalties can be much more severe.

Most common-law countries prohibit common assault, which could apply to road rage in which the personal safety of the victim is seen to be threatened. The common law regards assault as both a criminal and civil matter, leading to both public criminal penalties and private civil liabilities.

=== Germany ===
Road rage, insults, and rude gestures in traffic can lead to fines and prison sentences for drivers who shout insults or make offensive gestures while driving.

=== New Zealand ===
In New Zealand, road rage in itself is not an offence, but drivers are usually charged with other offences committed during an act of road rage (usually assault or unlawful possession of an offensive weapon). Drivers have a legal duty to take reasonable care to avoid endangerment of human life when operating a vehicle (§ 156 Crimes Act 1961); failure to discharge this duty, such as an act of aggressive driving, can give rise to liability in criminal nuisance (§ 146 Crimes Act 1961). Ramming a vehicle constitutes intentional or reckless damage to property, a criminal offence, with a maximum penalty of seven years of imprisonment (§ 269 Crimes Act 1961). New Zealand courts currently have no powers to disqualify drivers who physically assault another road user.

=== Singapore ===
Road rage is a crime in Singapore. Offenders found guilty of road rage may be liable to an imprisonment term of up to two years and / or a fine of up to $5,000 for causing damage.

=== United Kingdom ===
In the UK, road rage can result in criminal penalties for assault or more serious offences against the person. The Public Order Act 1986 can also apply to road rage. Sections 4A and 5 of the 1986 Act prohibit public acts likely to cause harassment, alarm or distress. Section 4 also prohibits threatening, abusive or insulting words or behaviour with intent to cause a victim to believe that violence will be used against himself or another.

=== United States ===
In some jurisdictions, such as the Commonwealth of Virginia, it is easier to prosecute road rage as reckless driving instead of aggressive driving simply because the burden of proof does not require intent to successfully convict.

It is likely that those causing serious injury or death during road-rage incidents will suffer more serious penalties than those applicable to similar outcomes from simple negligence. In April 2007, a Colorado driver was convicted of first-degree murder and sentenced to two consecutive life terms for causing the deaths of two motorists in November 2005.

Fourteen U.S. states have passed laws against aggressive driving. Only one state, California, has turned "road rage" into a legal term of art by giving it a particular meaning. In Virginia, aggressive driving is punished as a lesser crime (Class 2 misdemeanor) than is reckless driving (Class 1 misdemeanor).

== Rankings ==
=== United Kingdom ===
In the UK, most aggressive driving occurs in the East Riding of Yorkshire, while the least occurs in Durham, according to 2022 surveys.

=== United States ===
A 2007 study of the largest U.S. metropolitan areas concluded that the cities with the least courteous drivers (most road rage) are Miami, Phoenix, New York, Los Angeles and Boston. The cities with the most courteous drivers (least road rage) are Minneapolis, Nashville, St. Louis, Seattle and Atlanta. In a 2009 AutoVantage survey, New York, Dallas/Fort Worth, Detroit, Atlanta and Minneapolis/St. Paul were rated the top five American cities for road rage.

According to the Texas Department of Transportation, there were 2,510 road rage-related accidents in Texas in 2022, with the largest number occurring in the cities of San Antonio and Houston, with Houston road rage incidents increasing 135% since 2016. The cities with the highest per capita rates were Midlothian, San Antonio and New Braunfels.

== See also ==
- Air rage
- Bike rage
- Jaywalking
- Sidewalk rage
- Motor Mania

== General sources ==
- Controlling Road Rage: A Literature Review and Pilot Study Prepared for The AAA Foundation for Traffic Safety By Daniel B. Rathbone, Ph.D. Jorg C. Huckabee, MSCE June 9, 1999
- Road Rage: Causes and Dangers of Aggressive Driving (transcript of a portion of the official hearing record of the Committee on Transportation and Infrastructure – 1997)
- Summary Table on Aggressive Driving Laws, National Highway Traffic Safety Administration
- Survey of the States – Speeding, Governors Highway Safety Association
