= Bike rage =

Angry or aggressive behaviour involving cycling

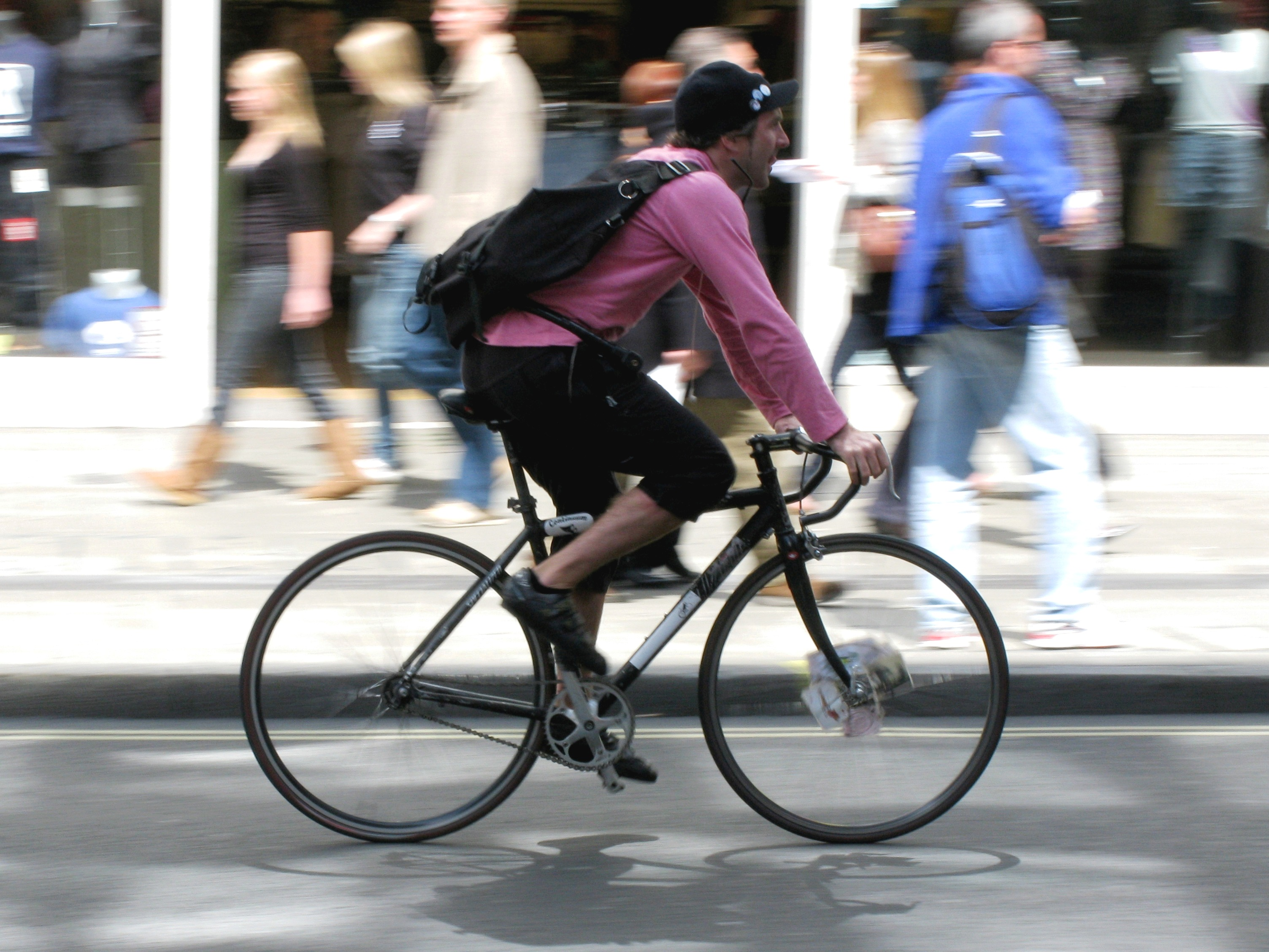
Bike couriers often have to ride in heavy downtown traffic.

Bike rage refers to form of road rage in which acts of verbal or gestural anger or physical aggression between cyclists and other users of bike paths or roadways, including pedestrians, other cyclists, motorcyclists, or drivers. Bike rage can consist of shouting at other road users, making obscene gestures or threats, hitting or punching, or in rare cases, even more violent acts. The term can refer either to acts committed by cyclists or by other road users against cyclists. Bike rage is related to other explosive outbursts of anger such as road rage.

== Causes ==
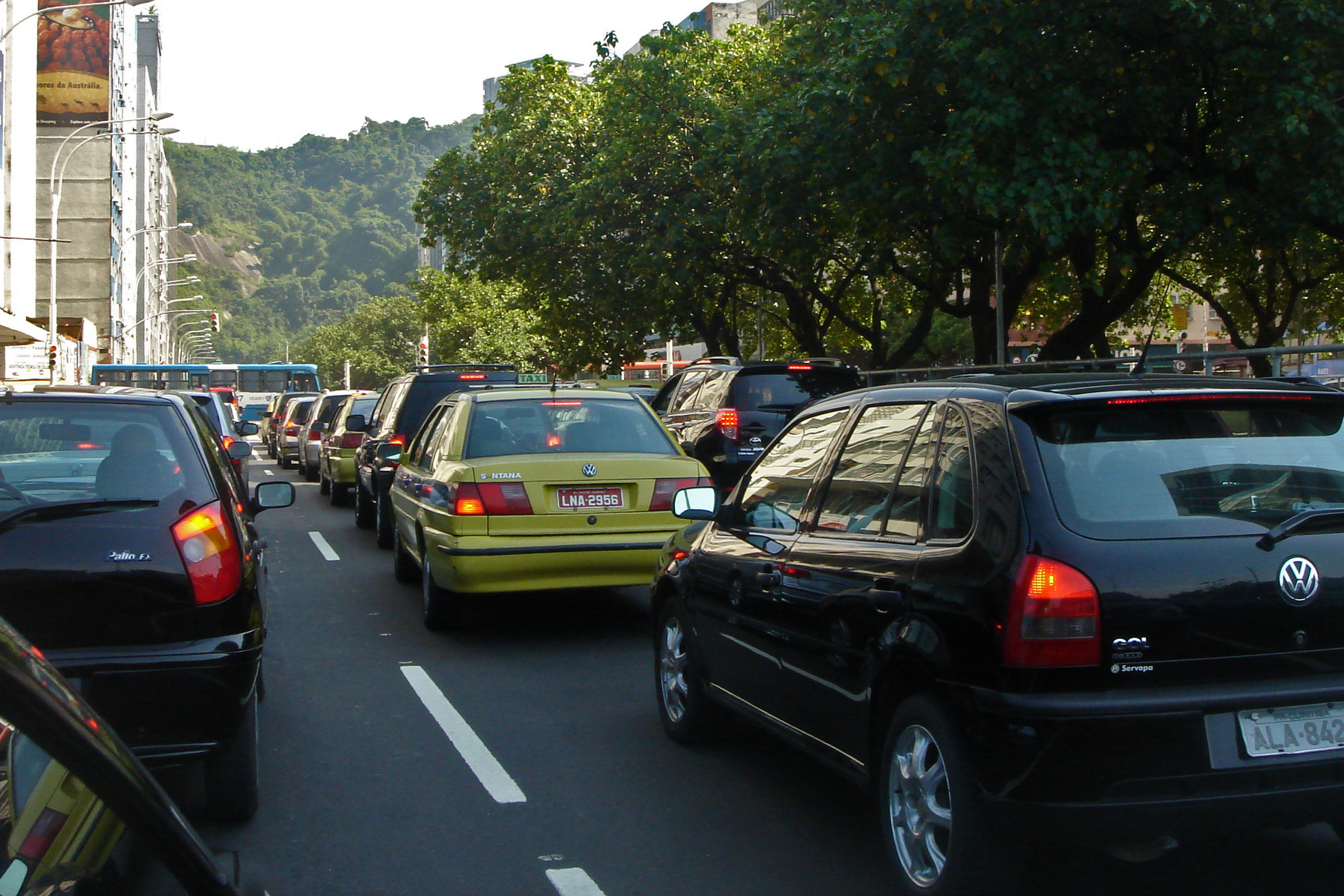
Some transportation experts argue that traffic congestion may be a contributing factor to driver frustration and bike rage.

A bike rage incident can start because a cyclist, driver, or pedestrian believes that another road user was being discourteous, breaking traffic rules, or in many cases because someone felt that their safety was being compromised by the actions of another road user. According to University of Hawaii professor of psychology Leon James, "bike rage is a common occurrence, and quite predictable", because urban commuting causes "tension, anxiety, and anger – in drivers as well as cyclists". Charles Montgomery of Momentum Magazine Ltd claims some cyclists hit cars using a "classic U-lock bash-and-run" tactic. He argues that "some cyclists consider such attacks acts of driver education". Montgomery claims the "... problem is that city planners have mixed bikes and cars together in ways that offer little certainty about how each should operate, and lots of chances for conflict". As such, "cyclists feel threatened in traffic" and "... hard done by and under attack."

An article in Toronto Life magazine argues that the "... source of the problem [bike and road rage] is neither the arrogance of drivers nor the militancy of cyclists, but the environment in which they interact." The article claims that the "... urban grid, already congested with cars, is being flooded with cyclists ... intensifying competition for road space." One issue is that "[d]rivers are not sufficiently alert to the presence and the quickness of cyclists". A possible explanation for all of the aggression that occurs between cyclists and drivers is the anonymity of the big city: "... they know they will never run into that person again."

A member of the S.F. Bicycle Coalition argues that "Road rage is a symptom of a contradiction between the image and promise of cars and the reality," because "You never see a car ad showing someone stuck in traffic." After an altercation between cyclists and police, an observer noted that "The sheep—like the man who was just riding to the gym and decided to join and have a little fun—were bewildered, angry, defiant. Turned into wolves."

A 2008 New York Times article stated that "... overwhelmingly, on blogs and Web sites nationwide, drivers and cyclists routinely describe shouted epithets, flung water bottles, sprays of spit and harrowing near-misses of the intentional kind." The article noted that there is "a whiff of class warfare in the simmering hostility, too. During morning rush, the teeth-gritting of drivers is almost audible, as superbly fit cyclists, wearing Sharpie-toned spandex and riding $3,000 bikes, cockily dart through the swampy, stolid traffic to offices with bike racks and showers."

Bike rage may also be caused by confusion about how the rules of the road apply to cyclists. In some jurisdictions, cyclists are allowed to ride on the sidewalk, whereas in other places, this is against the law. In all fifty U.S. states, bicycles are classified as vehicles and cyclists have many of the same rights and responsibilities as other drivers; however, other jurisdictions may place restrictions on where citizens may operate bicycles. These differences in rules may lead drivers to believe that a cyclist is violating the law by cycling on a roadway, even if local laws require cyclists to be on the road. Many citizens are also ignorant of their localities' laws concerning bicycles.

== Examples ==
=== Drivers attacking cyclists ===
In Toronto in January 2006, a driver tossed his lunch out the window of his car in a traffic jam. A 26-year-old bike courier threw the food back into the car. The driver tossed two cups of hot coffee at the courier, and then, after they exchanged insults, the driver attacked the woman and her bike.

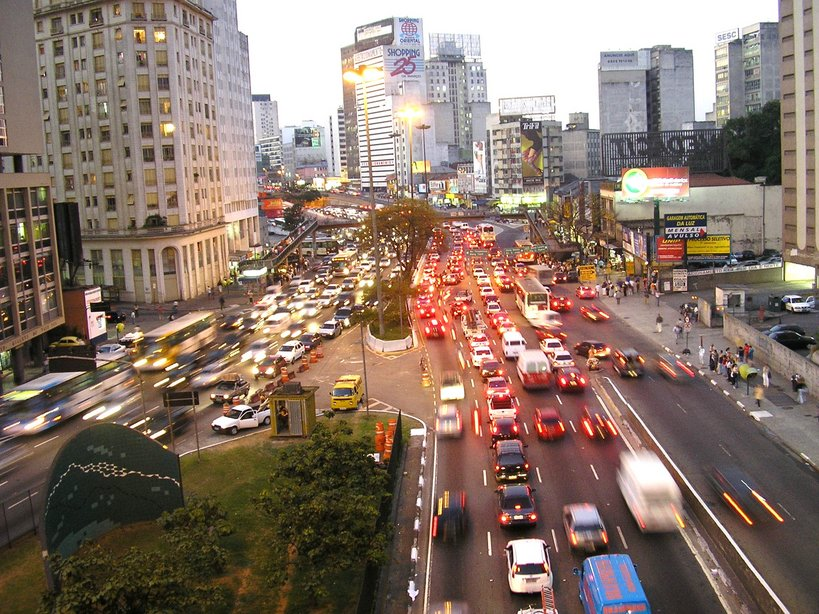
Urban land use is often dominated by automobiles. Pictured: São Paulo, Brazil.

In 2009 in Los Angeles, a 59-year-old man was "charged with two felony counts each of reckless driving causing injury, battery with serious bodily injury and the special allegation of causing great bodily injury". After the man had an argument with two cyclists, he "allegedly stopped short and caused one [bike] rider to go through the rear window of Dr. Thompson's Infiniti and other rider to crash onto the pavement. The driver, who admitted slamming on his brakes, was later sentenced to 10 years in prison."

A New York Times story stated a 41-year-old cyclist, Dan Cooley, was injured by a driver who became angry at him after an exchange of swear words. The incident began when the driver came out of a driveway in front of Mr. Cooley. Angered, Mr. Cooley cursed at the driver, who responded in kind. As Mr. Cooley moved off the road, the car drove into him, and knocked him to the ground with the vehicle, and then the driver got out of the car and attacked him, leaving him with a concussion and a torn ligament. Mr. Cooley thinks that the anger between cyclists and drivers might be due to the relatively new arrival of bikes on city streets: “We’ve had a car culture for so long and suddenly the roads become saturated with bicyclists trying to save gas"; however, he added, “No one knows how to share the road.”

According to the UK Guardian, a cyclist named Jefferey Guffey from Indiana told a driver to slow down. The driver attacked Guffey and bit part of his ear off. After the incident, police charged the attacker with battery. In Oxford, "police investigated a spate of attacks on cyclists motivated, apparently, by hatred of bicycles and their riders".

Christian Wolmar, an international expert on transportation, stated that Sydney "drivers are more hostile towards cyclists than motorists of any other country".

=== Cyclists attacking drivers ===
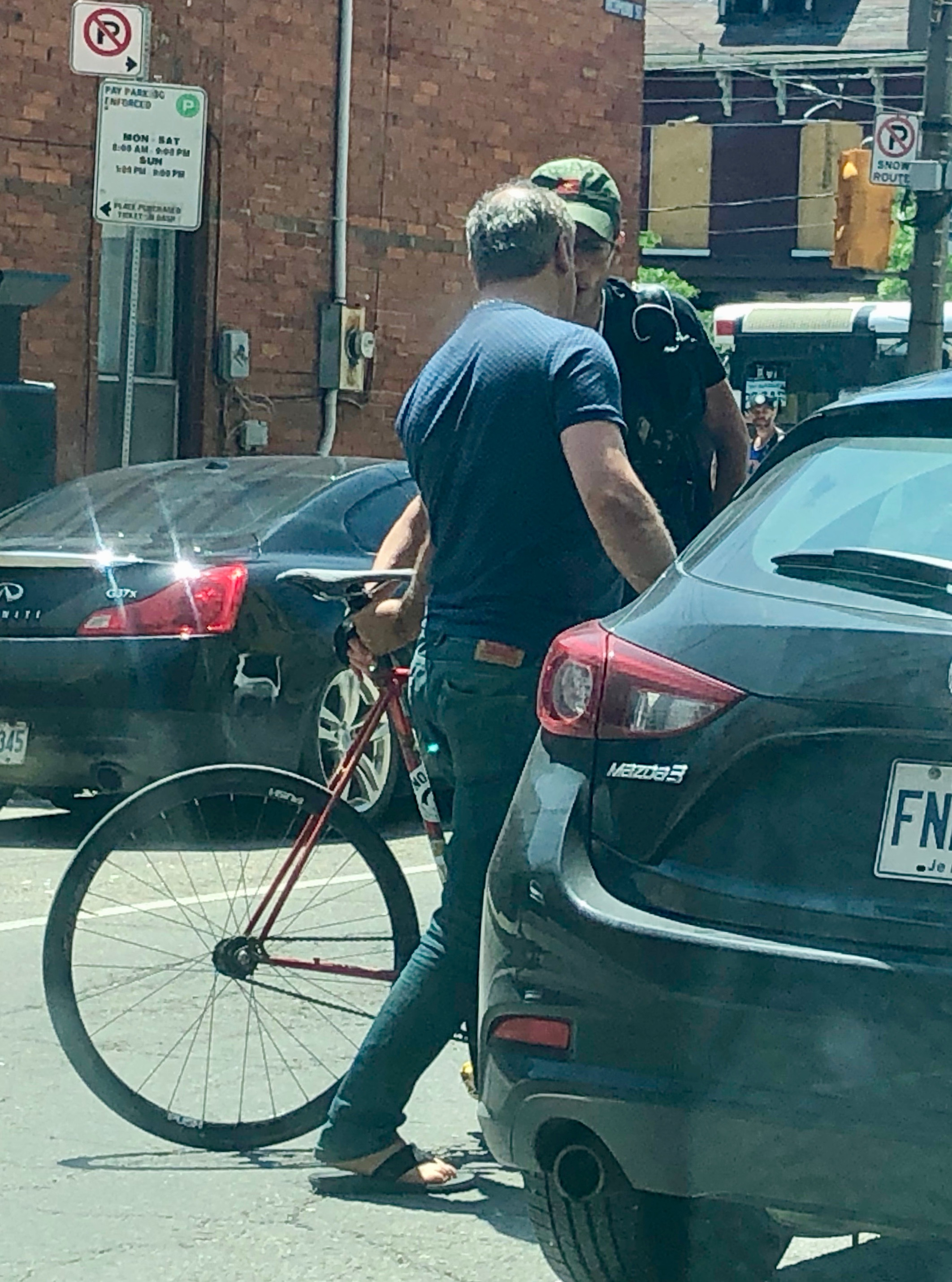
Bike rage incident in Toronto, Ontario in which both the cyclist & motorist attacked each other, June 23, 2019.

In Toronto in 2007, "... after being cut off by a driver just after morning rush hour in Toronto, a cyclist caught up to the car, reached inside the window, and stabbed the driver in the face and neck with a screwdriver."

A 2004 Chicago Sun-Times article states that a Pennsylvania bicyclist shot a truck driver in the arm after an altercation. The truck driver, William Nicoletti, 51, drove past the cyclist, who made an obscene gesture. Mr. Nicoletti stated that when he turned his truck around and drove toward the cyclist, man on the bike drew a pistol and shot Mr. Nicoletti. The man on the bicycle, Robert Urick, 41, was "charged with attempted homicide, aggravated assault and weapons offenses".

A 2008 Newsweek article entitled "Pedal vs. Metal: A surge in bike ridership spurs a new kind of road rage" described an altercation which began after a driver named Patrick Schrepping told cyclist Adam Leckie to wear a helmet. Following this conversation, Leckie "allegedly responded by keying Schrepping's car", and then Schrepping struck Leckie with a metal object. Both men were arrested and charged with assault.

Michael J. Bryant (born April 13, 1966), a Canadian lawyer and former politician in Ontario, Canada, was involved in an incident with a cyclist. After an altercation with a cyclist on August 31, 2009, in which Bryant's car struck a bike courier, Bryant was charged with criminal negligence causing death and dangerous driving causing death. On May 25, 2010, all charges against Bryant were withdrawn, with prosecutors describing the cyclist as the aggressor in the incident.

=== Cyclists attacking cyclists ===
Bike rage does not only involve altercations between drivers and cyclists. In some cases, there have been fights between cyclists. In an incident in Madison, Wisconsin, a 51-year-old cyclist suggested to a 28-year-old cyclist that he should get a bike light so that others could see him. After hearing this comment, the younger cyclist felt "extremely insulted" and allegedly tried to force the older man off the road. The 51-year-old was followed to his home, at which point the 28-year-old "clamped his hands around O'Brien's head" and then "... twisted O'Brien to the ground and kicked him in the ribs." Police indicated that they planned to charge the younger man.

== See also ==
- Aggressive driving
- Air rage
- Car chase
- Drive-by shooting
- Jaywalking
- Police brutality
- Road rage
- Sidewalk rage
- Traffic stop
- Traffic ticket
