= Air rage =

Disruptive or violent behavior on an aircraft

Air rage is aggressive or violent behavior on the part of passengers and crew of aircraft, especially during flight. Air rage generally covers both behavior of a passenger or crew member that is likely caused by physiological or psychological stresses associated with air travel, and when a passenger or crew member becomes unruly, angry, or violent on an aircraft during a flight. Excessive consumption of alcohol is often a cause.

Landing to disembark the troublemaker cannot usually be done quickly and causes great delays to passengers. However, unlike large ships, there is insufficient room on board to hold the offender in an isolated area until arrival. Therefore, diversions or unscheduled stops do occur because of air rage.

Examples of air rage behavior include failure to follow safety regulations, verbal abuse directed at flight attendants or other passengers, and other behavior that gives suspicion of a threat to flight safety.

While such incidents of aggressive, violent or otherwise uncontrolled anger occur most commonly in the passenger compartment, air rage can have serious implications if the offender decides to interfere with the aircraft's navigation or flight controls. Generally, such passengers do not intend to commit terrorist acts, but since the September 11 attacks, such incidents have been taken more seriously due to increased awareness of terrorism.

== History ==
The first case of air rage was recorded in 1947 on a flight from Havana to Miami, when a drunk man assaulted another passenger and a flight attendant. Another early documented case involved a flight in Alaska in 1950.

At the time, applicable jurisdiction was unclear, so offenders often escaped punishment. It wasn't until the 1963 Tokyo Convention that laws of the country where the aircraft is registered were agreed to take precedence.

Air rage events have increased since International Air Transport Association (IATA) started collecting data on disruptive passenger behavior in 2007. No definite explanation for that trend has been established; possible explanations include heightened anxiety for one's safety and irritation with invasive security. In 2019, the European Union Aviation Safety Agency (EASA) reported a c. 33% rise in air rage incidents on European flights between 2017 and 2018. EASA stated that every three hours, a passenger compromised the safety of a flight within the EU through misconduct, with at least 70% of these incidents involving aggression. Moreover, escalating air rage situations that necessitated an emergency landing happened once a month on average. A flight attendant representing the Vereniging Nederlands Cabinepersoneel (Dutch Aircrew Association) outlined several possible reasons for the rise: more seats per airplane, more and longer flights lead to more annoyance amongst passengers, and thus more aggression incidents.

After the start of the COVID-19 pandemic, an uptick in air rage was noted by media outlets and the U.S. Federal Aviation Administration. Most incidents involved the mandated use of face masks, scarves, or covering under federal law, resulting in attacks on other passengers or airline personnel. Dutch airlines KLM and Transavia noticed the same increase in air rage, and in September 2022, they established a joint blacklist for banned passengers.

== Causes ==
Stressful situations, such as jet lag, flight delays, or irritating passengers or crew members in one's vicinity can lead passengers and crew members to an increased likelihood of becoming agitated and air rage. Passengers who are afraid of flying can easily panic.

Some research suggests that visible inequality between seat classes on flights (first class, business class, economy class) may be responsible for an increase in air rage incidents.

It is also suggested by some experts that the primary cause of air rage is the deterioration of economy class amenities and seating space over recent decades.

Air rage can be the result of a combination of factors. For example, a person who is already afraid of flying can be tipped over the edge by an overuse of alcohol, medication, a stressful situation, nicotine withdrawal, or disruptive behavior from others.

The availability of alcoholic beverages on airlines and at airports enables passengers and crew members to drink excessively before and during flights. Flight attendants have the ability to keep track of how many drinks are served to passengers while on board an aircraft, and are required by many countries to refuse further drinks to passengers who appear intoxicated, but have no way of knowing how many are consumed prior to boarding. An analysis of online media reports relating to air rage incidents occurring between 2000 and 2020 found that the United States and the United Kingdom were the most frequent countries of origin for the 228 cases found, with 127 cases involving alcohol consumption. According to one study by the School of Hotel and Tourism Management at Hong Kong Polytechnic University (HKPU), half of all air rage incidents on Western airlines involve alcohol.

Markus Schuckert, a co-author of the study, told SCMP that on Asian airlines, where air rage incidents are rarer, the air rage incidents that do occur arise from inexperience and lack of knowledge about the restrictions involved. In China, where Schuckert described some incidents of air rage as "legendary" due to pictures or video posted on social media, some passengers have been known to do things like open cabin doors while the plane was taxiing to let hot air out, or throw coins in the engines for good luck.

Sometimes, passengers are disruptive by failing to obey laws and rules that must be observed or arguing with flight attendants.

It is also possible in some cases, due to the fact that crew members have sole discretion to determine whether a passenger is being disruptive, that some incidents may be caused or exacerbated by intolerant or confrontational behavior on the part of crew members. For example, in 2020, the cabin crew of an American Airlines flight called the police on a "disruptive" passenger who complained that some airline employees had not been wearing COVID masks.

== Threat Levels ==
The Federal Aviation Administration of the United States, in coordination with the ICAO, identifies four levels of threats to aviation due to unruly passengers.

- Level 1: Disruptive behavior - suspicious or threatening
- Level 2: Physically abusive behavior
- Level 3: Life-threatening behavior
- Level 4: Attempted or actual breach of the flight deck

== Traits ==
Air rage generally covers both behavior of a passenger or airline employee on the aircraft or more generally speaking at the airport:

- Violent, aggressive or disruptive behaviour.
- Threatening flight safety, crew members or passengers.
- Behaving in a way that gives suspicion of a threat to flight safety.
- Failure to follow safety regulations.
- Claiming to have a bomb on the flight or saying they are a terrorist with malignant intent.

Other related behavior that may interfere with the comfort of cabin crew or passengers include smoking on board the flight, viewing pornographic materials, performing sex acts ("mile high club") in the aircraft cabin, making undue sexual advances towards other people, performing sex acts in the lavatory, the inappropriate groping and touching of crew members, loud or drunken behaviors, spitting, swearing, and wearing clothing that is inappropriate or offensive.

== Handling air rage ==
Extremely unruly passengers or crew members who must be restrained are restrained using a variety of methods. Some airlines carry flexcuffs for this purpose. Others use seatbelts, adhesive tape, neckties, shoe laces, waist belts, or whatever is available on the aircraft. While the United States does not allow passengers to actually be confined to the seat or any other part of the aircraft, and only allows their individual body parts to be restrained, other countries, such as Iceland, do allow tying an unruly passenger to the seat.

In Australia, the Civil Aviation Safety Authority reserves the right to use stun guns to subdue unruly passengers.

Sometimes a flight must be diverted to allow an aircraft to dispose itself of the offender as soon as possible.

Low-cost airlines usually have younger and less-trained, less-experienced personnel, who therefore struggle more to handle air rage incidents.

== Consequences ==
In the United States, passengers who disrupt the duties of a flight crew member can face fines up to $25,000 and sometimes lengthy prison sentences. In addition, the airline can choose to ban the problem passenger from any future flights. As of 2022, the FAA continues a zero tolerance policy for unruly passengers.

In Canada, the pilot-in-command (PIC) of the aircraft is designated as a peace officer under the Criminal Code and as such, have the same powers of arrest as a police officer. The PIC is authorized to enforce all sections of the Criminal Code and all Acts of Parliament while the aircraft is in flight.

With the number of unlawful acts committed on airplanes in South Korea more than tripling from 2011 to 2016, Korean Air Lines issued guidelines allowing crew members to use stun guns on violent passengers and banning those with a history of unruly behavior.

On 29 September 2022, KLM and Transavia established a joint blacklist for banned passengers, meaning that any passenger misbehaving on a flight of either airline is banned from flying with both airlines for the duration of 5 years. The frequency of mid-air incidents involving unruly passengers increased significantly after the start of the COVID-19 pandemic and put a heavy burden on personnel of both airlines, and they wished to prevent passengers banned by one airline from making trouble on another flight of the other. The exchange of KLM–Transavia banned passenger data, that had so far been hampered by legal obstructions, was said to be the first of its kind in the world. Back in August 2017, the Federation of Dutch Trade Unions (FNV) and other trade unions had already put forward the idea of a shared blacklist for banned passengers amongst all European airlines to prevent passengers prone to air rage from causing trouble from one airline to the next.

== See also ==
- List of air rage incidents
- Law enforcement
- Security police
- Border guard
- Police
- Bike rage
- Road rage
- Police brutality
- Riot
- Stress in the aviation industry
