= Footpath encroachment =

Obstruction of sidewalks

Footpath encroachment by street vending in Taiwan.

Footpath encroachment (or sidewalk obstruction) occurs when footpaths are commandeered for private use or storage.

Entities that can encroach on footpaths include parked cars, street vendors, infrastructure like utility poles, and parked micromobility devices like e-scooters.

Footpath encroachment endangers pedestrians by forcing them into the street and can block disabled people. Encroachment is illegal in many jurisdictions, some of which have taken enforcement actions to keep footpaths clear.

== Types ==
A utility pole blocking a footpath in Brazil

The type of encroachment depends on locale, but often includes parked vehicles.

Sometimes, owners of property adjacent to footpaths may encroach to build gardens, stairs, ramps, or sheltered structures.

In other cases, footpaths are extensively (sometimes permanently) encroached upon for the purpose of conducting private business, such as vending. Taking 19th century New York City as a historical example, city officials attempted to prescribe a maximum time that a peddler could stand in a single spot on the footpath, so as to discourage the so-called "pushcart evil". Contemporary Los Angeles drew up similar regulations to discourage encroachment.

Utility poles and other infrastructure can also block footpaths.

Parking of micromobility devices like e-scooters in a way that blocks footpaths may also be encroachment.

Some people consider the use of sidewalks by commercial delivery robots to be encroachment.

== Consequences ==
Footpath encroachment often forces pedestrians into the road, causing traffic deaths. It can also prevent people with ambulatory disabilities from proceeding at all. A 1999 study of pedestrian road crossing behaviours in high-crash areas of Karachi found that, on average, 77% of the width of the footpath was encroached upon.

== Enforcement ==
A vehicle parked on the footpath in Tbilisi, Georgia

In 2026, the Supreme Court of India ruled that Articles 19 and 21 of the country's Constitution guaranteed a fundamental right to walk on demarcated footpaths, meaning that every road in the country must have footpaths that are kept free of encroachment. It subsequently directed the central government to identify five cities for a program to establish demarcated and encroachment-free footpaths at the side of every road. In two months following the ruling, the Greater Bengaluru Authority cleared encroachments from more than 1,000 kilometres (600 mi) of footpaths, which included encroachments erected permanently by private businesses. Reprisals from street vendors led to instances of violence. In the same year in Mumbai, officials vowed to begin filing first information reports against repeated vehicle encroachers.

A footpath encroached upon by dumping in Bengaluru, Karnataka, India.

Enforcement of anti-encroachment measures is occasionally seen as overzealous, as in a 2023 case in San Francisco involving a Little Free Library. Street vendors also generally oppose anti-encroachment measures. The application of anti-encroachment measures against people who are homeless is especially contentious.

== See also ==
- Sit-lie ordinance
- Carwalking
