= Decelostat =

Railroad wheel slide protection braking system

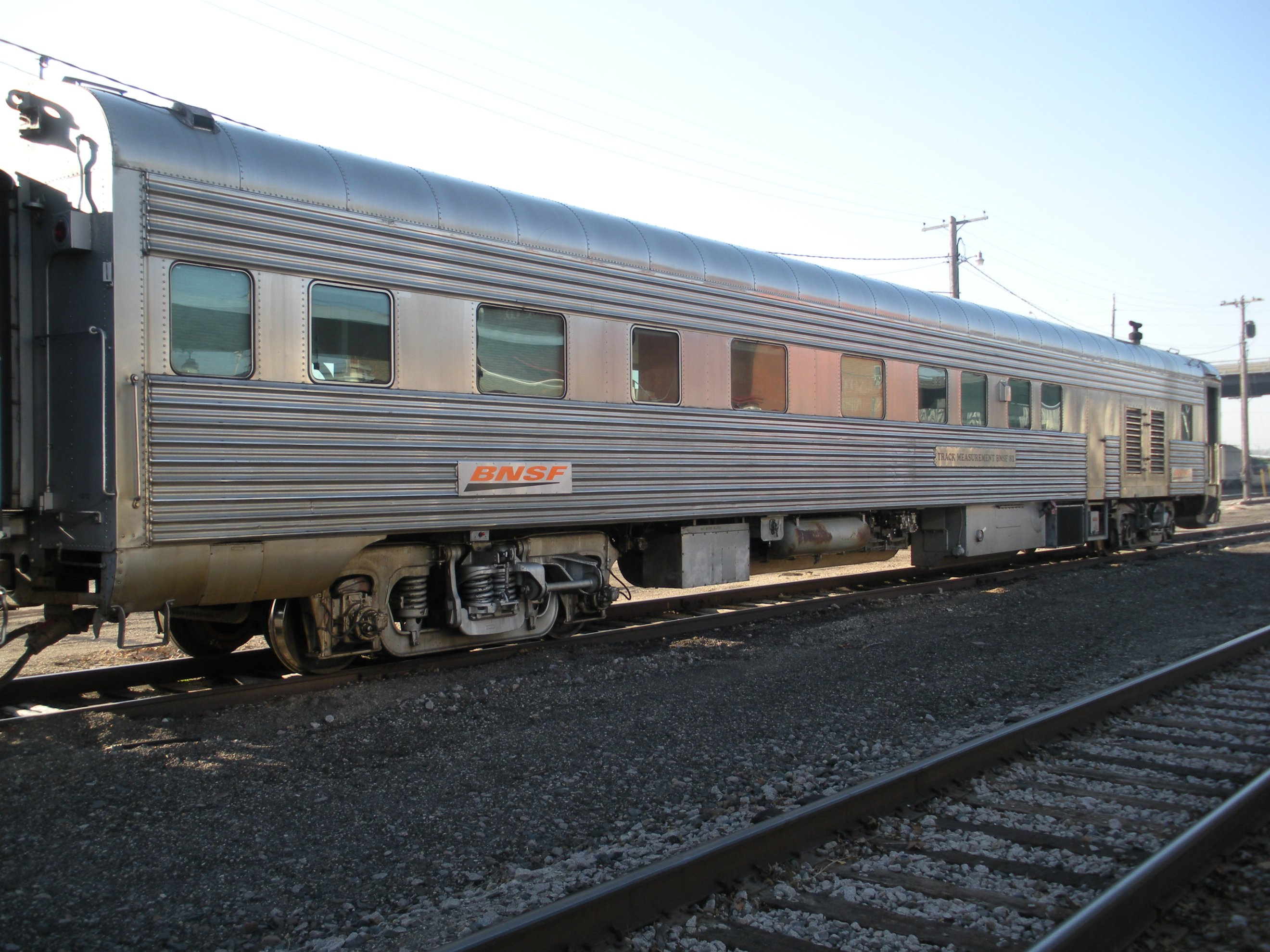
B-3 Decelostat valve at the axlebox (the end of the axle) of this railway wagon

Decelostat is a wheel slide protection system developed by Westinghouse Air Brake Company that is used in railroad cars to prevent over-braking that causes wheel-slide, a condition of reduction in friction between train wheels and rails. This low wheel/rail adhesion condition reduces braking performance and causes damage to wheels (wheel spalling and wheel flat) and the rails.

When over-braking, the Decelostat will detect rapid deceleration of wheel rotation caused by creep in the wheelset, another condition preceding the wheel-slide. Once detected, the system manipulates brake valves to reduce brake pressure. This allows the affected wheels to rotate at the speeds that are more comparable to the speeds of the train to gain the wheel/rail adhesion again. When that happens, the system deactivates to allow the brake pressure to be restored to continue braking. The system may reactivate again if it detects another creep. The cycle of activation and deactivation is usually brief but it could take place repeatedly during the braking process.

Decelostat was the term used by Westinghouse Air Brake Company when it originally developed the system in the 1930s. The term had then been used by the railway industry as a generic term to refer to wheel slide protection systems during the late twentieth century. However, it was a registered trademark of Westinghouse Air Brake Company from 1943 to 2003, and the trademark was assigned to Wabtec, Westinghouse's successor, in 2004.

== Components ==
The main components of the Decelostat system are wheel speed/acceleration reader, controller and valve. The reader component is the unit that is attached to the axle journal in order to read speeds or acceleration/deceleration of the wheels. The function of the controller component is to detect the situations, such as a rapid deceleration in excess of the limit, in order to activate the valve unit. The valve unit manipulates air brake to reduce braking cylinder pressure of the affected wheels. This can be done by activating a dump valve to release the air in the brake cylinder to the atmosphere. The valve unit may contain multiple valves such that it would close off the protection valve to block off any air from the line from entering the brake cylinder while opening the dump valve.

In some models, the reader and controller components may be combined into one unit. For example, a system that uses flywheel to read and detect deceleration beyond the limit can directly send signal to the valve component.

=== Direct-current generators ===
In the 1930s, Westinghouse Air Brake Company developed a wheel slip control system, first in an electrical type. The system operated by having a direct-current generator installed at the journal box of the axle. As the wheels moved, the generator would generate the output voltage. The voltage of the generator was then used to measure the acceleration (voltage increased) and deceleration (voltage decreased) of the associated wheels. The generator could be of any type but preferably a permanent-magnet type (magneto) which would allow polarities to be reversed when the wheels were turned in the reverse direction. The generator was connected to a controller which contained a series of capacitors and relays in the way that the detection could be done when wheels turned in either direction. When the wheels increased speed of rotation, it would cause the voltage from the generator to be higher. The circuit in the Decelostat was configured that when the capacitor was in the charging mode, the unidirectional relay would not be activated. When the wheels were rapidly decelerating, the voltage would be dropped at a high rate causing the capacitor to discharge reversely through the pick-up winding of the corresponding relay. This would cause the relay switch to pick up and activate the dump valve. The system would be set to a predetermined amount of deceleration that would trigger the dump, such as at the decelerating rate of 10 mph per second or more.

=== Flywheels ===
In the 1930s, Westinghouse developed another form of Decelostat using a flywheel of a rotary inertia type. The flywheel module is installed to the axlebox and connected to the wheel by a spring in such way that the flywheel will be rotating along with wheel. In a normal operation, the wheel will be rotated at the same speeds as the flywheel. In a heavy braking, the wheel will be decelerated at a higher rate than the flywheel, causing the inertia of the flywheel to overrun the rotation of the wheel. In a pneumatic system, this causes a valve to be open and makes the protection and dump valves to release air brake pressure. In an electro-pneumatic system, this causes an electric circuit to trigger the control module to activate the release of the air brake pressure. The release slows down the wheel brake to prevent wheel slipping, and brings the rotations of the wheel and the flywheel back to be in sync again. A well known pneumatic flywheel model is called "3-AP".

=== Electronic speed sensors and controllers ===
Modern Decelostat systems are made of an electronic speed sensor that measures the actual speed of the wheel and a controller that calculates the rate of deceleration to determine whether to reduce the braking to prevent wheel slipping or not. The "E-5" model is an example of such Decelostat systems. It has a 100-tooth gear that is attached to the wheel journal. The sensor measures the wheel speed by counting the gear teeth that are moved past the sensor.

=== Integration with braking sanding ===
A braking sanding system delivers sand on the rail in front of the wheel to improve wheel-to-rail adhesion to prevent wheel slide while braking. When using Decelostat alone without a braking sanding system, the wheel slide protection can get activated repeatedly while braking on a bad rail section because the root cause of wheel-rail adhesion is not addressed. Applying sand to the rail addresses the issue with adhesion to improve the braking performance. Decelostat can be integrated with a braking sanding system to let the two systems work together automatically. An example is a pneumatic Decelostat system that uses an actuator to control the braking sanding system. When the flywheel of the Decelostat detects a sharp deceleration of the wheel, the valve that relieves air pressure from the brake cylinder is actuated. At that time, the valve for the braking sanding is also actuated, delivering sand to the rail. Momentarily, the wheel speeds are back in sync with the flywheel, causing the Decelostat to close the valves to resume braking again. At that moment, the sand has already been delivered to the rail, making the braking more effective.

== In aviation ==
A Decelostat system was introduced to the aviation industry in the 1950s to control the wheel braking during the landing. A Decelostat unit was fitted inside the wheel component of the landing gear. In addition to the pneumatic system used on trains, the flywheel was also slightly modified to hook up to the oil-based hydraulic system. The principal of operation was still the same as in the pneumatic version by having the flywheel with a preset amount of optimal braking with deceleration rate without runway skidding. When there was a higher rate of deceleration, such as in runway skidding, the flywheel would push the valve piston, cutting the pressurized oil from reaching the wheel brakes and release the oil to the return circuit of the hydraulic braking system. This would relief the braking pressure from the landing wheels and allow them to gain speed again to match the flywheel. As the speed of the landing wheels became normal again, the valves were reset to normal mode to start applying the pressurized oil to the wheel brakes. These entire steps may repeat in rapid succession while the higher rate of wheel deceleration was still detected. The device was on trials first in the United States and later by the British.

Decelostat was also used in some of the U.S. military transport aircraft.

== In automobiles ==
In 1954, Popular Science revealed that there was preliminary testing of the Decelostat system to prevent car swirling on a heavy brake by the US car manufacturers in Detroit. However, there was no public information of the test results.

== Similar systems ==
In railway, the Budd Company developed a system in the 1940s to improve the use of the electrical model of Decelostat by giving back the control of the braking to the operator in the event of a short-circuit in the Decelostat controller. The company later developed its own wheel slip protection system called Rolakron. The system used the same flywheel technology to detect rapid rate of deceleration, but used the electronic circuit to control the valves. The system was used in rail cars in the late twenties century as an alternative to pneumatic Decelostat of Westinghouse. Both systems were phased out with introduction of an early speed sensor model of Decelostat.

In aviation, Dunlop introduced an antiskid unit called Maxaret in the 1950s using the flywheel concept similar to the Decelostat. By the 1970s, there were various antiskid braking systems used in commercial and military jet airplanes that were more sophisticated and designed to provide maximum braking effort while maintaining full antiskid protection under all weather conditions. National Aeronautics and Space Administration (NASA) also employed an antiskid system in each of the orbiter's four main landing gear wheels of the Space Shuttle.

In automobile, the root of anti-lock braking system (ABS) came from the development of antiskid systems in the aviation industry in the 1950s. The first generation of ABS units for automotive was in the early 1970s.
