= Maxaret =

Early anti-lock braking system

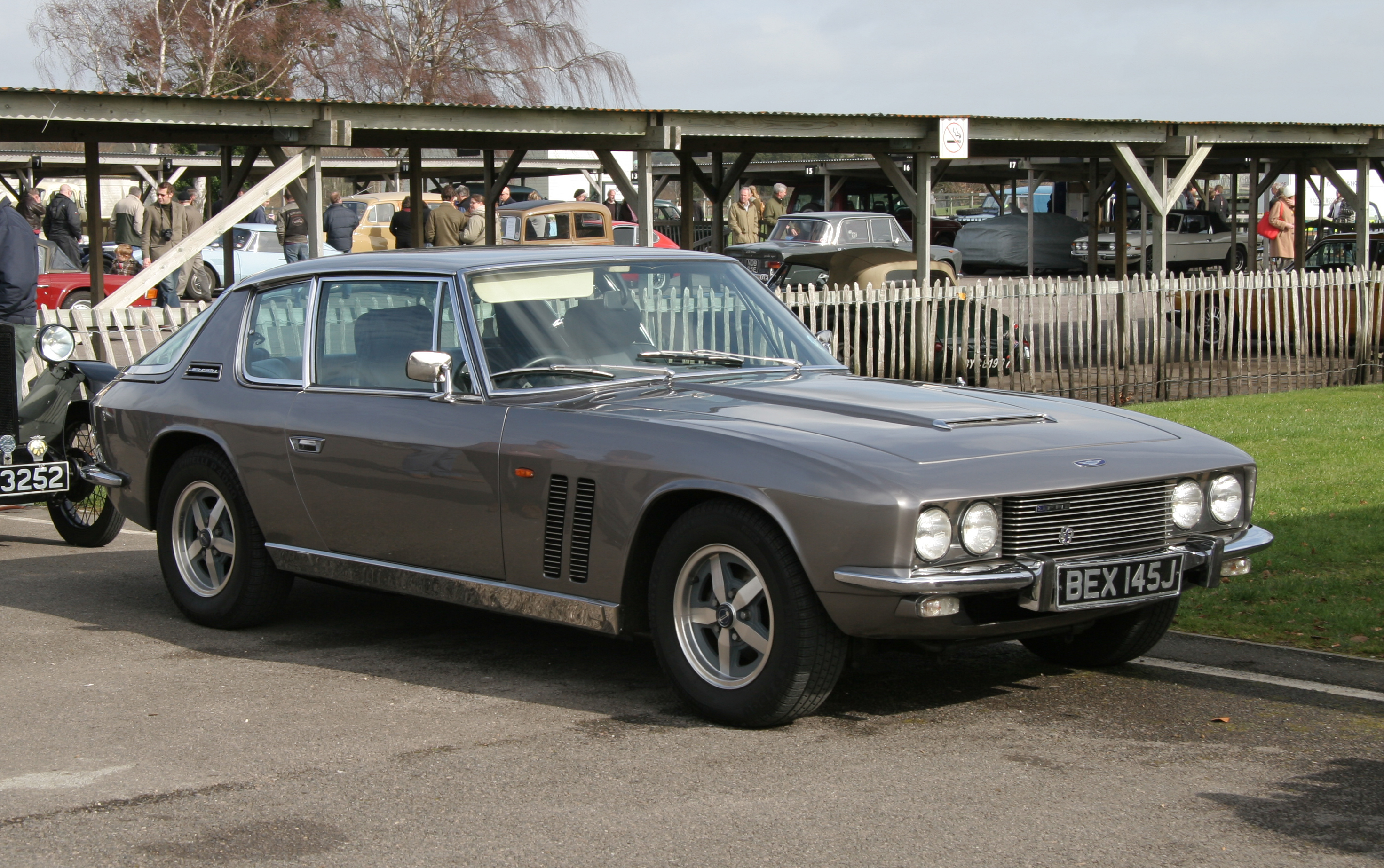
The Jensen FF, which Sports Illustrated called the safest car in the world.

Dunlop's Maxaret was the first anti-lock braking system (ABS) to be widely used. Introduced in the early 1950s, Maxaret was rapidly taken up in the aviation world, after testing found a 30% reduction in stopping distances, and the elimination of tyre bursts or flat spots due to skids. Experimental fittings on cars and motorcycles demonstrated mixed performance, and ABS systems would not appear on mainstream, non-sporting cars until the 1970s when electronic controls matured.

== Operation ==
The Maxaret system had four main parts, all of which weighed only 4.7 pounds and fitted within the small confines of a main landing gear wheel. The system was entirely mechanical and worked by measuring the relative speed of two spinning disks. The first, the "drum", was surrounded by a rubber disk and arranged within the wheel's internal periphery, so that the rubber maintained strong mechanical contact with the wheel. The second, a flywheel, was attached to the drum with a one-way clutch. Normally, with the wheel turning, the wheel would spin the drum, which would spin the flywheel, so that all of the moving parts were spinning at the same speed.

When a skid developed, the wheel would stop, stopping the drum along with it. The flywheel, driven by the one-way clutch, continued to spin. If the relative angle between the drum and flywheel reached 60 degrees, the drum would be driven forward to press on a valve. This released brake fluid into a reservoir, lowering hydraulic pressure, and releasing the brakes. As soon as the drum started spinning again and reached the (slowing) speed of the flywheel, the valve was released and the brakes re-applied. The system could cycle about ten times a second and could hold the brakes off for up to four seconds in total before the reservoir was full.

== Aircraft use ==
Aircraft have a much lower ratio of tyre contact patch to vehicle weight than automobiles and operate at much higher speeds. For these reasons, it is much easier to enter a skid in an aircraft through the over-application of brakes, and threshold braking is essentially impossible as the skid develops so rapidly. This makes landings in marginal conditions very difficult and leads to many common weather conditions precluding flying. Slippery conditions from heavy rain, or even light snow or ice, will close an airfield.

In early testing on the Avro Canada CF-100, the Maxaret allowed landings to be safely made on runways covered in ice. Since the operational requirements of most aircraft are defined by the best take-off or landing distances under all weather conditions, Maxaret allowed aircraft to operate at 15% higher all-up weights.

Another benefit was initially unexpected. Braking effect is greatly reduced at high speeds; the coefficient of friction between a tyre and concrete is about 0.7 to 1.0 at 30 miles per hour (48 km/h), but decreases dramatically to 0.3 to 0.5 at 120 miles per hour (190 km/h). This means that it is much easier to skid when first landing, a fact that led pilots to hold off on the brakes until the aircraft was firmly down, and then slowly increase pressure to avoid skids. With Maxaret, they simply applied full braking as soon as they touched down, knowing that the system would prevent skids. As a result, braking distances even in perfect conditions were greatly improved on the order of 30%. A later modification allowed the pilot to push on the brakes before landing, with the valve actually applying the brakes only after the wheel had spun up at least once.

When skidding occurs, the tyres can be rubbed flat, or even burst. Aircraft tyres have much shorter lifetimes than cars for these reasons. Since Maxaret reduced the skidding, spreading it out over the entire surface of the tyre, the tyre lifetime was improved. One early tester summed up the system thus:

The runway was very wet on the first landing, and the aircraft's all up weight was at least 12 per cent above the maximum landing weight. The brakes were held on at approximately 1,200 lb/sq in pressure from a speed of 80-85 knots, until the aircraft came to rest. The braking distance was estimated at 1,200 yards. The tyres were completely unmarked. Landing previously in an identical machine without Maxarets, and at approximately the same all up weight, great difficulty was experienced in stopping the aircraft in an estimated distance of 1,600 yards, with the braking parachute streamed at approximately 70 knots. On this occasion two tyres were burst, and the remaining six were damaged beyond repair.

Maxaret, developed by Dunlop in the UK, quickly found uses on most UK military aircraft, such as the Handley Page Victor, BAC TSR.2, and English Electric Lightning. Civil aircraft included airliners such as the Hawker Siddeley Trident. Many companies followed suit, both in military and civilian models. One interesting variation was used on the Fokker F-27 aircraft, which did not have a hydraulic system, and instead used a high-pressure pneumatic system to actuate the brakes, including the Maxaret anti-skid system.

Other aircraft fitted with Maxaret were the Avro Vulcan, Vickers Viscount, Vickers Valiant, Folland Gnat, de Havilland Comet 2c, de Havilland Sea Vixen, and later aircraft, such as the Vickers VC10, Hawker Siddeley 125, Hawker Siddeley HS 748 and derived British Aerospace ATP, and BAC One-Eleven.

By 1966 an electronic version of Maxaret had been developed, called Maxaret Mark X.

== Other uses ==
There were numerous applications of the Maxaret to various vehicles, including experimental fits to a Royal Enfield Super Meteor and some production use on semi-trailers.

Most noticeable to the general public was its use on the Jensen FF, the British sportscar that introduced ABS, all-wheel drive and a traction control system. Sports Illustrated called it the "safest car in the world" in a 1965 article. In this case the system had an undesirable side-effect; the relief valve fed directly into the master pump, and caused the brake pedal to drive back towards the driver when it actuated.

== Bibliography ==
- (Non-Skid), "Non-Skid Braking" Archived 2017-07-08 at the Wayback Machine, Flight International, 30 October 1953, pg. 587-588
- Graham Robson, "A to Z British cars 1945-1980", Herridge, 2006, ISBN 0-9541063-9-3
