= Wheel slide protection =

Wheel-slide prevention in railway vehicles

Wheel slide protection and wheel slip protection (WSP) are terms used to describe automatic systems used to detect and prevent wheel-slide on trains during braking or wheel-slip during acceleration. This is analogous to ABS and traction control systems used on motor vehicles. It is particularly important in slippery rail conditions.

== Sanding ==
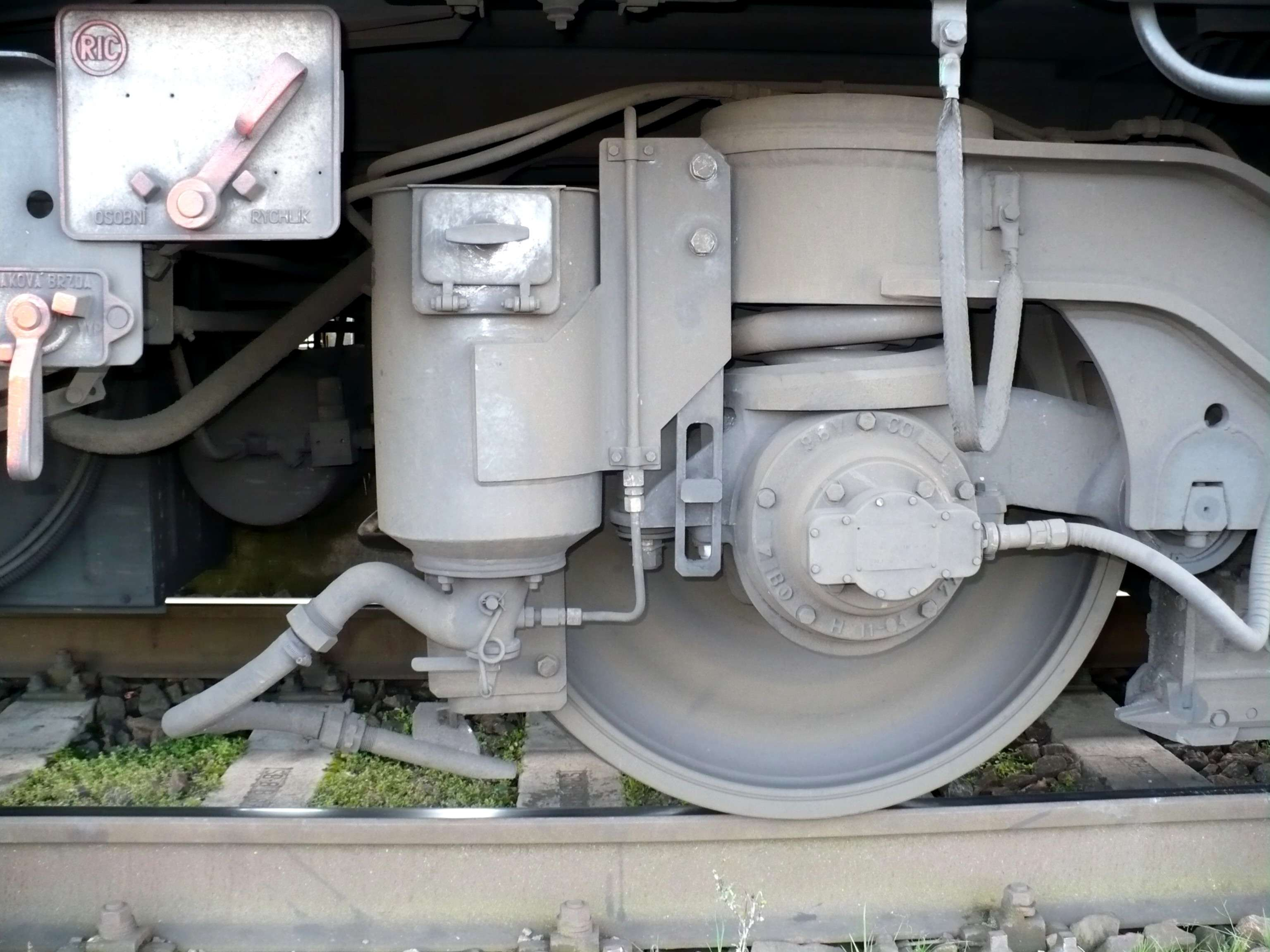
Sanding equipment on a ČD class 971 driving trailer

Sanding is one method of reducing wheel slip or slide. Locomotives and multiple units have sandboxes which can place dry sand on the rails, in front of the wheels. This may be initiated automatically when the Wheel Slide Protection system senses loss of adhesion, or the driver can operate it manually. Sanding may be connected to a computer system that determines the train's direction of travel and where the sand should be applied: either in front of or behind the trucks. In older locomotives there was a manual lever attached to a valve that had three positions: Off, Forward, and Aft.

== Automatic control systems ==
Wheel Slide Protection (WSP) equipment is generally fitted to passenger trains to manage the behavior of wheel sets in “low adhesion” (reduced wheel/rail friction) conditions. It is used when braking and may be considered analogous to anti-lock braking (ABS) in cars. The system can also be used to control (or provide an input to) the traction system to control wheel spin when applying power in low adhesion conditions.

“Low adhesion” on the rail potentially causes damage to train wheels and the rails. Typically, low adhesion conditions are associated with environmental causes arising from seasonal leaf fall, or industrial pollution. Occasionally, the cause can be another less obvious factor such as light oxidation of the railhead or even swarms of insects.

== Wheel slide whilst braking ==
When a train is braking, the low adhesion manifests as wheel slip where the wheelset is rotating at a lower velocity (speed) than the forward speed of the train. The most extreme example of this is where the wheel stops rotating altogether (wheel slide) while the train is still moving and can result in a “wheel flat” caused by the softer steel wheel being worn away by the harder steel rail.

However, the wheelset does not need to lock up completely in order for damage to be caused. If the slide is significant, heat can build up in the contact patch between the wheel and the rail, sufficiently to permanently modify the crystalline structure of the wheel's steel alloy. The steel becomes more brittle (martensite) which leads to cavities forming in the wheel. Wheel flats on railway vehicles are very evident by a distinct “bang-bang” noise made in time with the speed of the train. It is normally necessary to use a wheel lathe to remove a layer of wheel tread caused by a severe flat spot or cavity, which reduces the operational service life of the wheel and is a major operating cost to the rail industry.

== Wheel slip whilst taking power ==
In traction, low adhesion may cause a wheelset to accelerate more quickly than the train (wheel spin) to the point where it can damage the traction system or result in damage to the wheel and rail (rail burn).

== Controlled wheel slip ==
WSP is generally fitted as standard to new fleets of multiple units. The primary function of the WSP is to improve the ability of a train to stop in poor adhesion conditions. However, within the rail industry it is also recognised to be valuable in protecting the wheels from damage during sliding when braking or spinning in traction. This improvement is achieved by regulation of the wheelset velocity in a controlled manner so that it maintains a relatively consistent level of slip. The controlled slip has the effect of conditioning the contamination layer on the rail (scrubbing action) thereby improving the level of friction and enhancing the ability of the train to stop. Controlled wheel slip can also have a limited cleaning action on the rail head along the length of a train. This tends to result in the vehicles at the rear having more grip than those at the front.

== Driving technique ==
WSP continuously monitors the rotational speed of each axle on the locomotive or multiple unit, and intervenes whenever it detects a significant difference on any axle.

If wheelslip occurs whilst the power controller is open, WSP will shut off power to the affected traction motor(s). Despite this, most rail transport companies advise their drivers to close the power controller and allow the slipping wheels to stabilize before re-opening the controller on a low setting because control of the train can be achieved more quickly.

However, when wheelslide occurs and the WSP releases the brakes on affected axles, drivers are instructed to leave the brake handle alone and let the WSP control the train's braking. This is because the driver is sitting over the leading bogie of the train where wheelslide is usually most severe. This wheelslide will partially clean the railhead and so further down the train the wheels will achieve better adhesion, and thus braking effect.

== 'Low adhesion' training ==
Driving a train under low adhesion conditions takes experience. Failing to recognize and respond correctly to railhead contamination or environmental conditions which cause low adhesion can lead to safety incidents and accidents such as a signal passed at danger, collision or station overrun.

Prior to each leaf-fall season, many train companies arrange low adhesion training for their newly qualified drivers. This consists of taking over a section of line during a quiet period. Using lineside markers each driver gets his train up to speed and then makes a Full Service brake under normal adhesion conditions. The railhead is then treated with a contaminant that has a low coefficient of friction. On the second run the driver will experience the sound and sensation of the WSP activating and operating blowdown valves on the brake cylinders, and the stopping distance will be considerably greater.

Although this only provides an approximation of how a train will behave during low adhesion, it does ensure that the driver can recognize the onset of wheelslide and will know the correct actions to take when it occurs.

== Microprocessor control ==
Modern WSP systems are microprocessor controlled and employ two stage valves that permit fine control over the air pressure in the brake cylinders. This is essential to be able to capture and control a sliding wheel and to minimise the amount of air resource used by the WSP. When the brake is applied, the WSP first applies the dynamic brake. If that is not successful it then “blends” the friction and dynamic braking systems. If control is still not established the system reverts to friction braking only where blowdown valves rapidly cycle the air in the brake cylinders. Examples of this kind of equipment are manufactured by Knorr Bremse (EP compact, EP2002) Faiveley Transport (EPAC) and POLI Wabtec (ATHENA).

== Manufacturers ==
Manufacturers of WSP equipment include Faiveley Transport, Knorr-Bremse, Wabtec, DAKO, KES & Co GmbH, Mitsubishi, Siemens, Selectron Systems AG, ABB and LCA Ballauri.

== Testing ==
Demonstrating the improvement provided by a WSP system is very difficult as the naturally occurring low adhesion condition occurring at the rail can be difficult to re-create in a test track environment.

=== Track testing ===
For track testing, a detergent based solution has historically been used to provide low adhesion test conditions. European and international standards often refer to this test method (BS-EN 15595, UIC 541-05). In the UK, British Rail Research adopted two approaches including a laboratory simulation method to all WSP approvals from around 1992, and track testing using carefully conditioned paper tape adhered to the railhead. The paper tape method used in the UK is believed to offer a realistic representation of the challenging very low adhesion conditions encountered during the autumn leaf fall. With an increase in the privatisation of railways in Europe, track testing has become very expensive to organise and to conduct. As a consequence, simulation based testing is rapidly becoming more popular with WSP manufacturers and national bodies.

=== Simulation testing ===
Simulation testing employs a computer representation of the train and the track conditions, and signals are provided to the WSP system that effectively deceive it into thinking it is fitted to an actual train.

== See also ==
- Decelostat
