= 2018 Bank of America Roval 400 =

Stock car race in Concord, North Carolina

Race details
- Race 29 of 36 in the 2018 Monster Energy NASCAR Cup Series
- 2018 Bank of America Roval 400 program cover, with artwork by Sam Bass.
- Date: September 30, 2018
- Official name: Inaugural Bank of America Roval 400
- Location: Charlotte Motor Speedway, Concord, North Carolina, United States
- Course: Permanent racing facility
- Course length: 2.280 miles (3.669 km)
- Distance: 109 laps, 248.520 mi (399.954 km)
- Weather: Temperatures hovering around 71.8 °F (22.1 °C); wind speeds reaching up to 5.87 miles per hour (9.45 km/h)
- Average speed: 82.125 miles per hour (132.167 km/h)

Pole position
Driver	Kurt Busch	Stewart–Haas Racing
- Time: 76.805

Most laps led
Driver	Kyle Larson	Chip Ganassi Racing
- Laps: 47

Winner
No. 12	Ryan Blaney	Team Penske

Television in the United States
- Network: NBC
- Announcers: Rick Allen, Jeff Burton, Steve Letarte, Dale Earnhardt Jr.
- Nielsen ratings: 1.95/1.99 (Overnight)

Radio in the United States
- Radio: PRN
- Booth announcers: Doug Rice, Mark Garrow
- Turn announcers: Nick Yeoman (turns 1, 2, 3), Mike Jaynes (turns 4, 5, 6), Doug Turnbull (turns 7, 8, 9), Pat Patterson (turns 10, 11, 12), Rob Albright (turns 13, 14, 15)

The 2018 Bank of America Roval 400, the inaugural running of the event, was a Monster Energy NASCAR Cup Series stock car race that was held on September 30, 2018, at Charlotte Motor Speedway in Concord, North Carolina. Contested over 109 laps, it was the 29th race of the 2018 Monster Energy NASCAR Cup Series season, the third of ten races in the season-ending NASCAR Playoffs, and the final race of the Round of 16. The race was won by Ryan Blaney of Team Penske; Chip Ganassi Racing's Jamie McMurray finished second and Clint Bowyer was third for Stewart–Haas Racing.

Bowyer, Jimmie Johnson, Erik Jones, and Denny Hamlin all entered the race in the last four Playoff positions, meaning they were in danger of being eliminated from the Playoffs. Several major accidents at the exit of the back stretch chicane in the practice sessions resulted in a left-side tire barrier being moved back. Kurt Busch recorded the fastest time of qualifications and won the pole position. Kyle Larson overtook him on the seventh lap and went on to win stage one. He continued leading until he made a pit stop on lap 37, handing the lead to eventual stage two winner Blaney, but reclaimed it once Blaney pitted. After Ricky Stenhouse Jr. skidded off-course, Brad Keselowski overtook him for the lead. Concerns for fuel mileage surrounding Keselowski and Larson's teams were dispersed when a caution was issued with less than ten laps remaining. In the ensuing restart, however, both drivers slammed nose-first into a tire barrier, sparking a 15-car pileup. Martin Truex Jr. and Johnson then raced for the win until the latter overapplied his brakes coming to the checkered flag and spun into the former on the front stretch chicane, allowing Blaney to pass them both for the win.

The race had eight cautions and ten lead changes among eight drivers. Blaney's win was the second of his career and his sole victory of the 2018 season. With the points being reset, Kyle Busch attained the Drivers' Championship lead, while Truex Jr. fell to third in the standings. Despite his damage, Larson managed to overtake Jeffrey Earnhardt on the final lap and was placed in a three-way tie for the final two transfer spots in the Round of 12. He and Aric Almirola were the beneficiaries of the tiebreaker, leaving Johnson, Austin Dillon, Hamlin, and Jones out of the Playoffs. Ford had also claimed the Manufacturers' Championship lead from Toyota with seven races left in the season.

== Background ==
An aerial view of Charlotte Motor Speedway (pictured in 2005), where the race was held.

In May 2017, plans were announced for the Monster Energy NASCAR Cup Series to race on the 13-turn 2.4 mi (3.9 km) roval configuration of Charlotte Motor Speedway in Concord, North Carolina for the first time, which combined elements of the oval course and the infield road course. The race's distance was 500 km (310 mi) and 130 laps, and it was to be held on September 30, 2018, as the 29th race of the 2018 season and the third of ten rounds in the season-ending NASCAR Playoffs, marking the first road course race to be included in the championship format since its introduction in 2004. This was done to add distinction to the fall event at Charlotte, which Speedway Motorsports Inc. (SMI) president Marcus Smith felt needed "something special." Prior to the announcement, A. J. Allmendinger tested on the circuit in January 2017 and spoke positively about it in a press conference.

The course's layout was altered in October 2017 to add two new chicanes to the front stretch and back stretch in order to allow for more passing opportunities, and again in January 2018 with two of the last three infield corners removed to boost lap times, thus forming a 17-turn 2.28 mi (3.67 km) circuit. The event was later titled the Bank of America Roval 400 and shortened to 400 km (250 mi) and 109 laps, which were split into three stages; the first two stages consisted of 25 laps each, while the last had 59 laps.

To prepare for the event, Goodyear conducted two private multi-day testing sessions at the roval course of Charlotte Motor Speedway on October 17–18, 2017 and March 20–21, 2018. The second day of the latter session was rescheduled to May 1 due to inclement weather. Two open testing sessions were also hosted at the track by NASCAR on July 10 and 17; they both began at 9:00 AM Eastern Daylight Time, were paused at 12:00 PM for an hour-long lunch break, and ended at 5:00 PM. During the first hour of the session on July 10, numerous racers bypassed the designated front stretch chicane, including Bubba Wallace, who skidded into the turn-one tire barrier. To prevent shortcutting, NASCAR placed additional tire barriers and rumble strips to the chicane, which caused the session to be extended by an hour. Michael McDowell also spun late in the afternoon. Kyle Busch was the fastest overall driver on July 17 with a top speed of 106.8 mph (171.9 km/h), which he set during the afternoon, while Aric Almirola and Joey Logano led the morning session with a speed of 105.4 mph (169.6 km/h). Ryan Blaney crashed into the tire barrier in the third and fourth turns; Alex Bowman and Erik Jones also spun separately in the same area, though neither sustained major damage. In the afternoon, William Byron locked up his brakes and slammed the tire barrier head-on in turn one.

Heading into the race, Martin Truex Jr. led the Drivers' Championship with 2,141 points, 16 more than Kyle Busch in second and 28 more than Kevin Harvick in third. Team Penske teammates Brad Keselowski and Logano were fourth on 2,111 points and fifth on 2,081 points, respectively. Almirola, Kyle Larson, Kurt Busch, Chase Elliott, Austin Dillon, Bowman, Blaney, Clint Bowyer, Jimmie Johnson, Jones, and Denny Hamlin rounded out the top 16 drivers competing in the NASCAR Playoffs. Because this was the final race of the Round of 16, the latter four drivers—Bowyer, Johnson, Jones, and Hamlin—were all at risk of being eliminated from the Playoffs. Conversely, Keselowski's win at Las Vegas, Kyle Busch's win at Richmond, and the points Truex Jr. had accumulated were enough to ensure the three drivers would advance to the Round of 12. Harvick would also earn a spot in the Round of 12 so long as he started the race. Toyota was leading the Manufacturers' Championship with 1,015 points, followed by Ford with 1,010 and Chevrolet with 915. Goodyear brought 11 sets of radial tires (three for practice sessions, one for qualifying, and seven for the race), along with six sets of wet tires (two for practice sessions and four for the race), for the race weekend.

Several teams opted to change their drivers for the race. IMSA WeatherTech SportsCar Championship driver Justin Marks partnered with Premium Motorsports for what was to be his last start in NASCAR, while Ross Chastain drove the team's part-time No. 7 entry. Daniel Hemric, a regular in the second-tier NASCAR Xfinity Series who participated in the preliminary October 2017 test, was set to make his second start in the Cup Series after competing in the Toyota Owners 400 in April. Five days before the race, Stanton Barrett agreed to drive the Rick Ware Racing-prepared No. 51 entry, marking his first start in the Cup Series since the 2006 Dover 400. (Note: Barrett had since entered seven Cup Series races in 2006–2008, but failed to qualify for all of them.) Cole Whitt took Corey LaJoie's seat at TriStar Motorsports for the first time since the Go Bowling at The Glen a month prior.

== Practice and qualifying ==
Three practice sessions preceded the race on Sunday, all of which lasted 50 minutes. The first was held on Friday, and the last two were held on Saturday. Kyle Busch led the first session on Friday with a time of 77.145 seconds, eleven thousandths of a second quicker than fellow Joe Gibbs Racing driver Jones, with Logano, Hemric, and Bowyer rounding out the top-five. During the session, Hamlin and McDowell's splitters were damaged after they drove over the six-inch-high curb in turn 13, while Blaney and Austin Dillon slammed the left-hand-side wall while exiting the corner and sustained heavy nose damage. Almirola and Ricky Stenhouse Jr. both crashed into the barrier in turn three. Wallace was spotted spinning at least three times. With 20 minutes left, the pace car had even spun on the circuit.

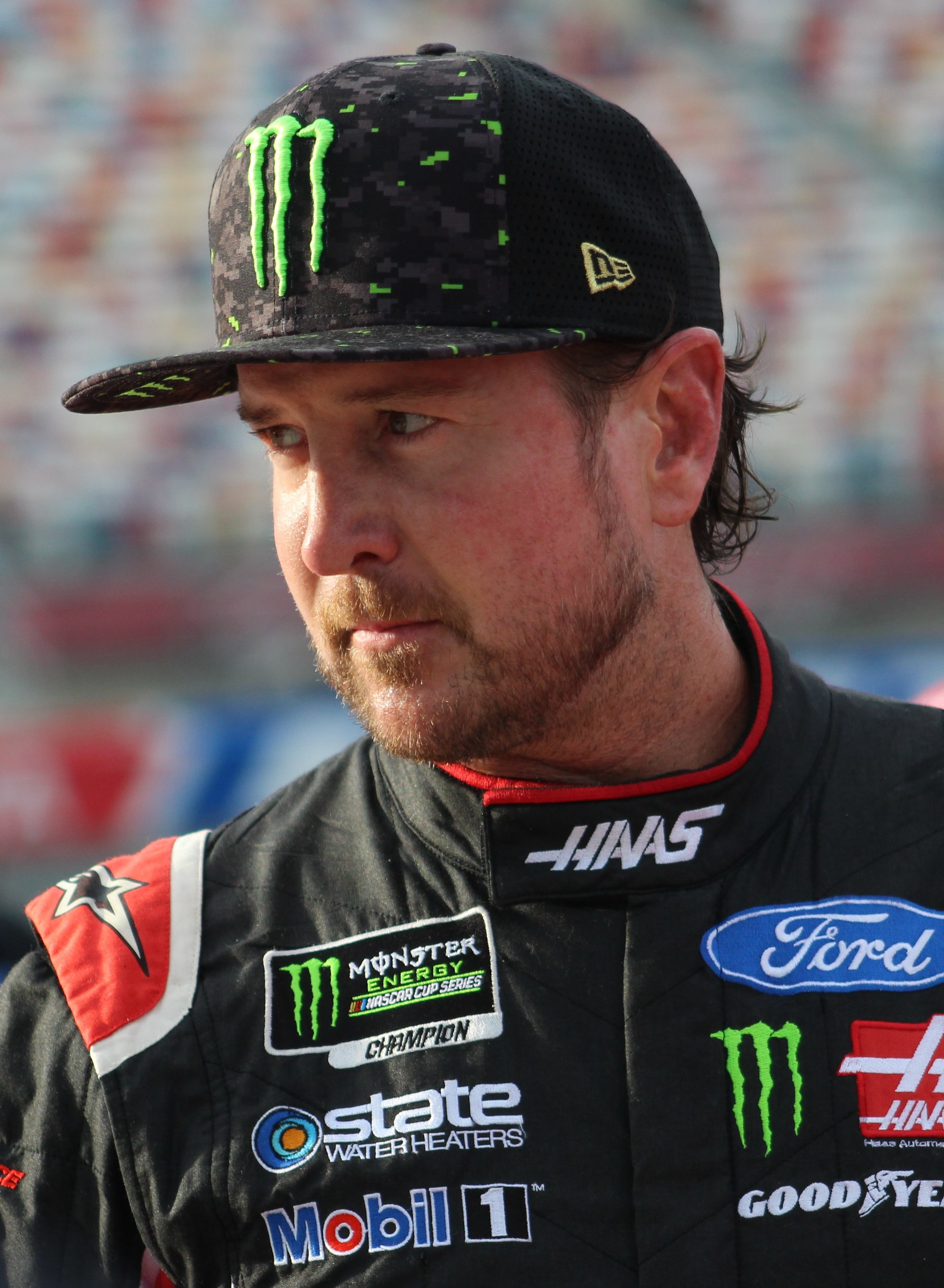
Kurt Busch earned his 26th career pole position.

Forty drivers were entered for qualifying, the maximum amount that was allowed to race as per NASCAR's qualifying procedure. Friday afternoon's qualifying session began almost four hours after the first practice session ended and was divided into two rounds. The first round lasted 25 minutes and determined the 13th–40th positions. After a ten-minute break, the fastest twelve drivers advanced to the second round, where they were allotted ten minutes to set the fastest laps for the top twelve positions. Kurt Busch was tenth-quickest in round one, but earned his fourth pole position of the season and the 26th of his career with a time of 76.805 seconds, which he set with two minutes left in the session. Allmendinger joined Busch on the grid's front row with a lap time that was 0.041 seconds slower. Bowman qualified third, Elliott fourth, and Larson fifth. Johnson, Bowyer, Jamie McMurray, Blaney, Chris Buescher, Hemric, and Jones were the last of the top-twelve qualifiers. Half of the NASCAR Playoffs drivers qualified outside the top-twelve; Truex Jr. took 13th, Kyle Busch 14th, Logano 15th, Harvick 19th, Almirola 20th, Austin Dillon 24th, Keselowski 25th, and Hamlin 27th. Three minutes into the first round, Hamlin lost control of his car at the 13th corner while trying to avoid hitting a left-side tire barrier; he slightly clipped it and crashed into the right-side SAFER barrier with the rear of his car, forcing him to resort to a backup car. After qualifying, Kurt Busch attributed his performance to his time practicing on a racing simulator and adjustments that his team made to his car.

On Saturday morning, Johnson was quickest in the second practice session with a lap timed at 78.043 seconds, ahead of second-placed Hemric, who was over a tenth of a second slower, and third-placed Truex Jr. Keselowski was fourth-quickest, and Kyle Busch took fifth. Stewart–Haas Racing drivers Almirola and Kurt Busch were hampered by troubles in the session, with Almirola backing into the turn-three tire barrier and Busch stalling on the track due to an electrical issue. Two separate incidents occurred towards the beginning and end of the session at the exit of turn 13, where Wallace and Jones both got loose and slammed directly into the tire barrier, destroying the noses of their cars. They switched to their backup cars as a result. After qualifications for the Xfinity Series' Drive for the Cure 200 concluded, NASCAR repositioned the tire barrier in order to provide about five feet of extra space for drivers exiting the back stretch chicane. Keselowski lapped the fastest time of the final practice session on Saturday afternoon at 77.730 seconds, but with ten minutes left, he made heavy contact with the front stretch wall after running over curbing at the exit of the 17th corner; he, too, utilized his backup car for the race. Byron trailed him in second, with Larson taking third, Paul Menard fourth, and Truex Jr. fifth. The start of the session was used by many drivers to practice the restart procedure, in which they were required to drive on the oval portion of the circuit instead of the front stretch chicane.

=== Qualifying results ===
The fastest lap in each of the two sessions is denoted in bold.

Final qualifying results
Grid	No.	Driver	Team	Manufacturer	Time	
Grid	No.	Driver	Team	Manufacturer	R1	R2
1	41	Kurt Busch	Stewart–Haas Racing	Ford	77.292	**76.805**
2	47	A. J. Allmendinger	JTG Daugherty Racing	Chevrolet	**76.956**	76.846
3	88	Alex Bowman	Hendrick Motorsports	Chevrolet	77.130	76.854
4	9	Chase Elliott	Hendrick Motorsports	Chevrolet	77.133	77.001
5	42	Kyle Larson	Chip Ganassi Racing	Chevrolet	77.184	77.017
6	48	Jimmie Johnson	Hendrick Motorsports	Chevrolet	77.140	77.098
7	14	Clint Bowyer	Stewart–Haas Racing	Ford	77.227	77.192
8	1	Jamie McMurray	Chip Ganassi Racing	Chevrolet	77.257	77.358
9	12	Ryan Blaney	Team Penske	Ford	77.350	77.493
10	37	Chris Buescher	JTG Daugherty Racing	Chevrolet	77.138	77.760
11	8	Daniel Hemric	Richard Childress Racing	Chevrolet	77.126	77.796
12	20	Erik Jones	Joe Gibbs Racing	Toyota	77.308	77.868^{1}
13	78	Martin Truex Jr.	Furniture Row Racing	Toyota	77.390	—
14	18	Kyle Busch	Joe Gibbs Racing	Toyota	77.575	—
15	22	Joey Logano	Team Penske	Ford	77.589	—
16	6	Trevor Bayne	Roush Fenway Racing	Ford	77.618	—
17	19	Daniel Suárez	Joe Gibbs Racing	Toyota	77.663	—
18	34	Michael McDowell	Front Row Motorsports	Ford	77.668	—
19	4	Kevin Harvick	Stewart–Haas Racing	Ford	77.947	—
20	10	Aric Almirola	Stewart–Haas Racing	Ford	78.031	—
21	24	William Byron	Hendrick Motorsports	Chevrolet	78.082	—
22	21	Paul Menard	Wood Brothers Racing	Ford	78.101	—
23	17	Ricky Stenhouse Jr.	Roush Fenway Racing	Ford	78.258	—
24	3	Austin Dillon	Richard Childress Racing	Chevrolet	78.389	—
25	2	Brad Keselowski	Team Penske	Ford	78.435	—^{1}
26	13	Ty Dillon	Germain Racing	Chevrolet	78.455	—
27	11	Denny Hamlin	Joe Gibbs Racing	Toyota	78.561	—^{1}
28	32	Matt DiBenedetto	Go Fas Racing	Ford	78.657	—
29	31	Ryan Newman	Richard Childress Racing	Chevrolet	78.665	—
30	38	David Ragan	Front Row Motorsports	Ford	78.898	—
31	15	Justin Marks	Premium Motorsports	Chevrolet	78.972	—
32	95	Regan Smith	Leavine Family Racing	Chevrolet	79.267	—^{2}
33	72	Cole Whitt	TriStar Motorsports	Chevrolet	79.489	—
34	43	Bubba Wallace	Richard Petty Motorsports	Chevrolet	79.910	—^{1}
35	7	Ross Chastain	Premium Motorsports	Chevrolet	79.940	—
36	23	J. J. Yeley	BK Racing	Toyota	80.444	—
37	96	Jeffrey Earnhardt	Gaunt Brothers Racing	Toyota	80.510	—
38	00	Landon Cassill	StarCom Racing	Chevrolet	81.196	—
39	51	Stanton Barrett	Rick Ware Racing	Ford	81.871	—
40	66	Timmy Hill	MBM Motorsports	Toyota	82.022	—
^{1} Moved to the back of the field for switching to a backup car^{2} Moved to the back of the field for changing engines

== Race ==
=== Stage 1 ===
Live television coverage of the race in the United States was broadcast by NBC and began with the hour-long pre-race program, Countdown to Green, at 1:00 PM. Commentary was provided by Rick Allen, Jeff Burton, Steve Letarte, and Dale Earnhardt Jr., while Dave Burns, Marty Snider, and Kelli Stavast reported from pit road throughout the race. Pre-race ceremonies began with an invocation from Jim Daly, president of evangelical Christian organization Focus on the Family. Singer Jordan Smith, who won the ninth season of The Voice, performed the national anthem. A flyover by a Boeing C-17 Globemaster III of the 145th Airlift Wing proceeded afterward. The Carolina Panthers' head coach Ron Rivera commanded the drivers to start their engines. Truex Jr.'s girlfriend Sherry Pollex drove the pace car. Five drivers were sent to the rear of the field during the pace laps for unapproved adjustments; Keselowski, Hamlin, Jones, and Wallace used backup cars, and Regan Smith had changed his engine.

The race began at 2:19 PM. Kurt Busch maintained his pole position advantage heading into the first turn, while Larson overtook Allmendinger for second place and drove close to the rear of Busch's car by the twelfth turn. Elliott had also passed Hendrick Motorsports teammate Bowman for the third position. On the sixth lap, Larson remained close to Busch in pursuit of the lead, while Hamlin entered pit road to replace a punctured tire and rejoined the race in 39th. The following lap, Larson drove to the right-side of Busch and overtook him on the front stretch chicane; he then pulled away from the field. Busch, meanwhile, lost the second position to Elliott in the first turn on lap ten. The first caution flag of the race was issued on the 13th lap, when Barrett experienced brake lock-up and plowed into the turn-one tire barrier. Some drivers, including the top-seven leaders, did not make a pit stop under the caution period. Allmendinger exited pit road first, but was placed outside of the top ten.

Larson led the field back up to speed for the restart on lap 17, followed by Elliott, Kurt Busch, and Johnson. Jones was almost pinched into the barrier in the first corner and sustained slight damage; he resultantly fell from 14th to 25th in the span of two laps. By lap 20, Larson extended his lead over Busch to 1.6 seconds. Three laps later, Hemric, Byron, Almirola, Ryan Newman, and Ty Dillon all made stops prior to the closure of pit road in accordance with their strategies. Larson continued holding onto the lead and won the first stage; Kurt Busch, Bowyer, Truex Jr., Elliott, Johnson, Kyle Busch, Allmendinger, Bowman, and Blaney completed the top-ten and earned points for their respective positions. The second caution was flown as a result of the stage's end.

==== Stage 1 results ====
Only the drivers in the top-ten points-scoring positions are included.

Stage 1 results
Pos.	No.	Driver	Team	Manufacturer	Points
1	42	Kyle Larson	Chip Ganassi Racing	Chevrolet	10
2	41	Kurt Busch	Stewart–Haas Racing	Ford	9
3	14	Clint Bowyer	Stewart–Haas Racing	Ford	8
4	78	Martin Truex Jr.	Furniture Row Racing	Toyota	7
5	9	Chase Elliott	Hendrick Motorsports	Chevrolet	6
6	48	Jimmie Johnson	Hendrick Motorsports	Chevrolet	5
7	18	Kyle Busch	Joe Gibbs Racing	Toyota	4
8	47	A. J. Allmendinger	JTG Daugherty Racing	Chevrolet	3
9	88	Alex Bowman	Hendrick Motorsports	Chevrolet	2
10	12	Ryan Blaney	Team Penske	Ford	1

=== Stage 2 ===
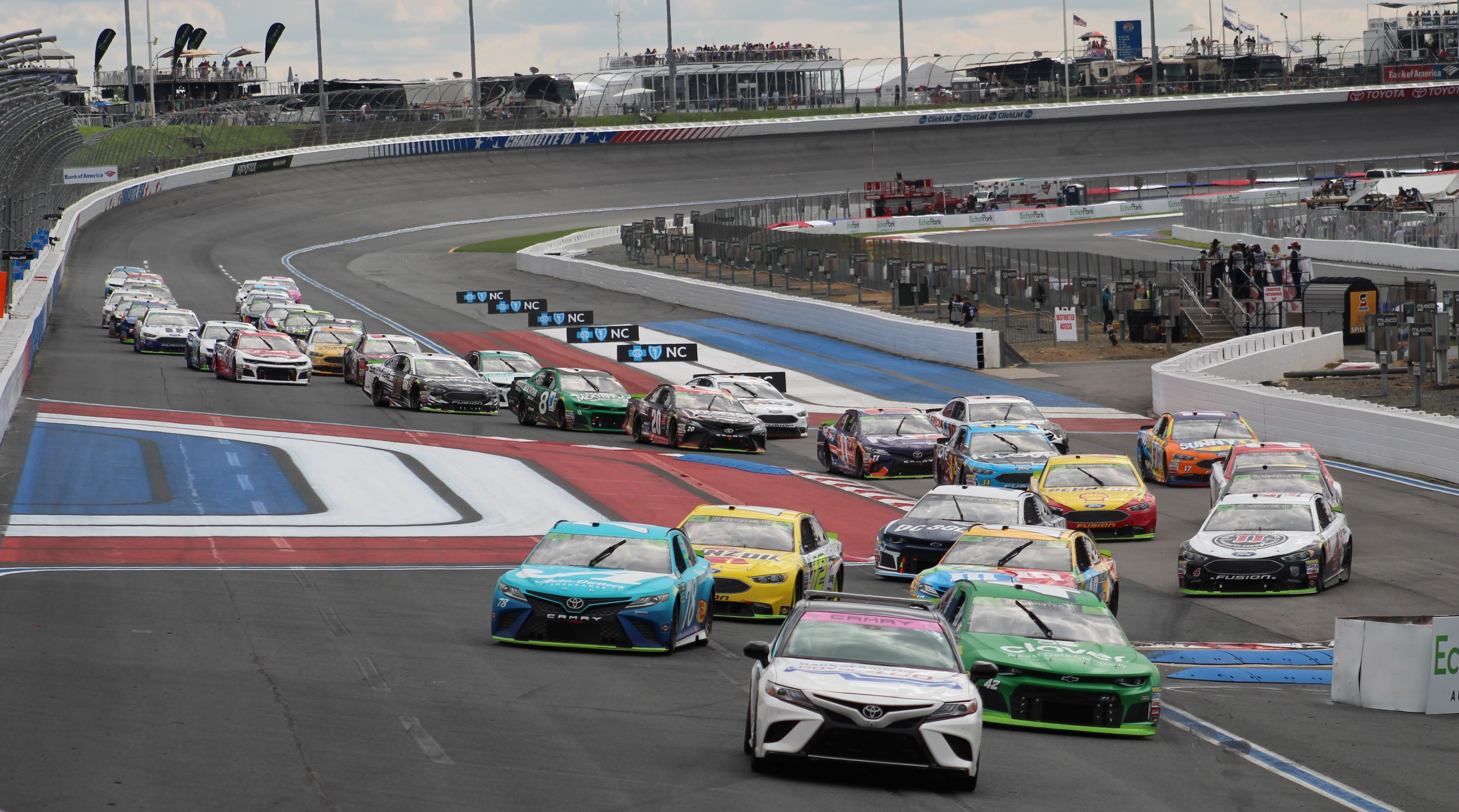
Kyle Larson (No. 42) and Martin Truex Jr. (No. 78) lead the field to begin the second stage.

Under caution, Kurt Busch, Bowyer, and Elliott led a line of cars into pit road, while Larson and others elected to stay on-track. Kurt Busch won the race off pit road, but because of the many drivers who pitted prior to the end of stage one, he was placed 23rd. Green-flag racing resumed on lap 30; Larson pulled ahead of Truex Jr. for the lead at the exit of turn one. On the 31st lap, Blaney overtook Kyle Busch for the third position as Harvick improved to fifth. Keselowski made his way up to sixth place by lap 32. A lap later, Marks spun in turn eight, but continued without necessitating a caution. Kyle Busch and Truex Jr. kicked off green-flag pit stops on lap 36; Larson made his stop the following lap, handing the lead to Blaney. Keselowski also pitted and ceded the second position to Harvick.

By lap 42, Blaney held a four-second lead over Harvick. Kurt Busch, who did not make a stop under the green-flag cycle, moved up to the sixth position on the 45th lap and remained near fifth-place Johnson. On lap 46, Harvick made a pit stop and gave up second place to Logano. Meanwhile, Byron suffered a flat right-front tire, but failed to turn into pit road. Almirola swerved to the outside to avoid him and bounced off the SAFER barrier in turn 15. Byron used the legends car oval course to drive into pit road, which resulted in a drive-through penalty. After Almirola made a stop the next lap, he was also issued a drive-through penalty because a tire had rolled out of his pit stall. On the 48th lap, Logano fell to fourth place as Johnson and Kurt Busch overtook him. The following lap, Keselowski attempted to pass Truex Jr. in turn 16, but applied the brakes too hard and hit him, causing them both to spin out. Blaney won stage two on lap 50, followed by Johnson, Kurt Busch, Logano, Bowyer, Elliott, Austin Dillon, Bowman, Larson, and Hemric. The third caution was issued shortly thereafter.

==== Stage 2 results ====
Only the drivers in the top-ten points-scoring positions are included.

Stage 2 results
Pos.	No.	Driver	Team	Manufacturer	Points
1	12	Ryan Blaney	Team Penske	Ford	10
2	48	Jimmie Johnson	Hendrick Motorsports	Chevrolet	9
3	41	Kurt Busch	Stewart–Haas Racing	Ford	8
4	22	Joey Logano	Team Penske	Ford	7
5	14	Clint Bowyer	Stewart–Haas Racing	Ford	6
6	9	Chase Elliott	Hendrick Motorsports	Chevrolet	5
7	3	Austin Dillon	Richard Childress Racing	Chevrolet	4
8	88	Alex Bowman	Hendrick Motorsports	Chevrolet	3
9	42	Kyle Larson	Chip Ganassi Racing	Chevrolet	2
10	8	Daniel Hemric	Richard Childress Racing	Chevrolet	0^{1}
^{1} Deemed ineligible from earning points in the Cup Series

=== Stage 3 ===
Every driver in the top-eight positions, including Blaney, entered pit road during the caution period for fresh tires, with Johnson exiting pit road ahead of Blaney. Larson opted not to pit and reclaimed the lead for the lap-55 restart, followed by Hemric, Kyle Busch, and Harvick. In the first turn, Hemric quickly lost the second and third positions to Kyle Busch and McMurray, respectively. Because of his worn-out tires, Hemric continued dropping in the running order and was hit from behind by Johnson in the 17th turn the following lap. On lap 58, Austin Dillon slid into the wall in turn 13 while trying to avoid the slower Buescher and expelled debris from his car, prompting the race's fourth caution. Dillon and Buescher both pitted to alleviate their cars' damage. Larson led at the restart on lap 62, with Kyle Busch in second, McMurray in third, and Harvick in fourth. Allmendinger braked deep into turn one and collided into the left side of Hamlin's car, leaving him with a major tire rub.

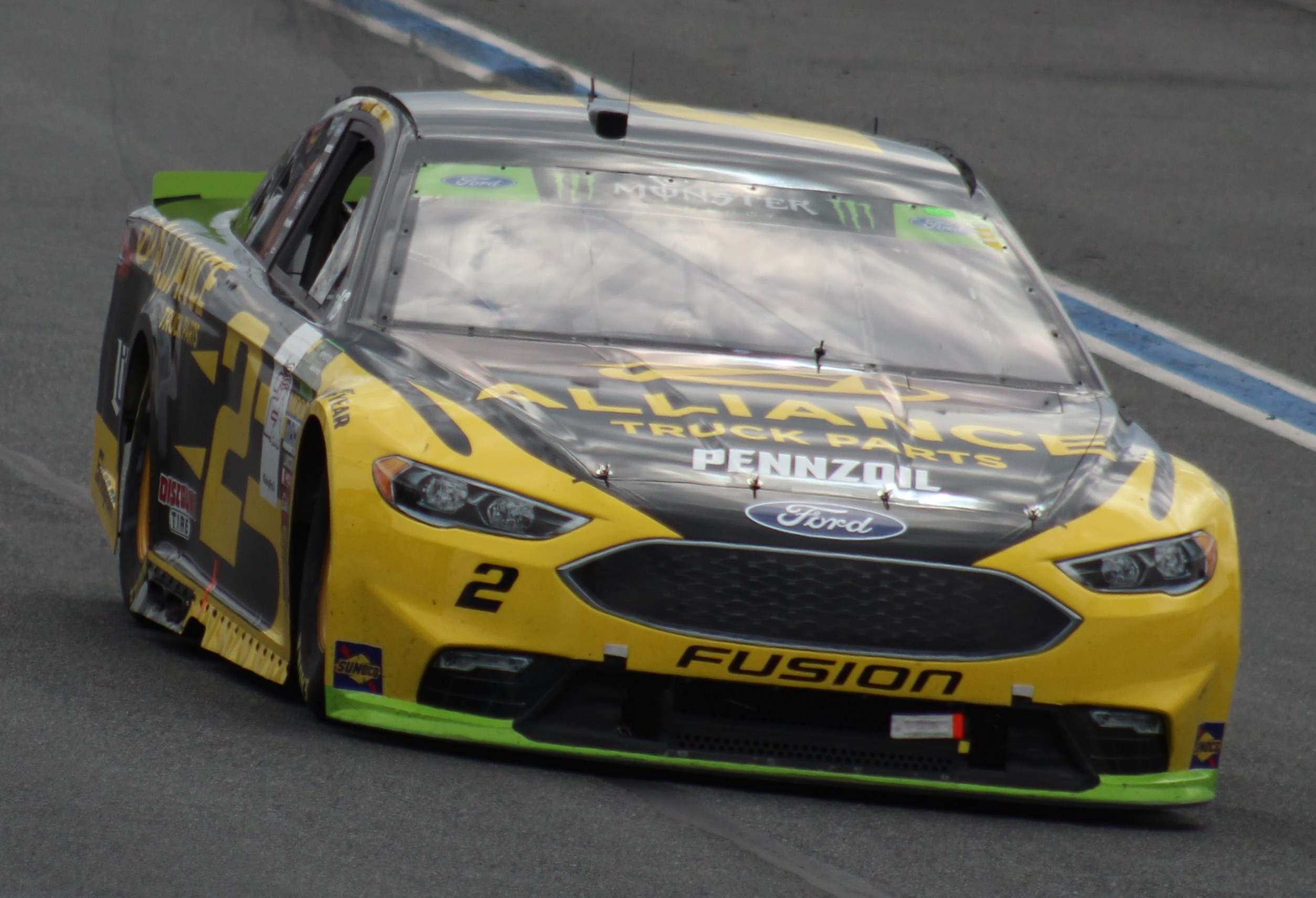
Brad Keselowski led 29 laps, but finished 31st after crashing on lap 104.

On the 65th lap, Austin Dillon blew a tire and slammed the turn-15 wall; the crash left a trail of debris on-track and brought out the fifth caution. Seventh-placed Jones led a handful of drivers into pit road; he rejoined the race outside the top-25. The top-four drivers did not change and Larson continued leading for the lap-68 restart. The following lap, Buescher skidded into the turn-five barrier and had an EchoPark-branded sign lodged into the rear of his car, while Almirola spun into the grass in turn six after being hit from behind by Stenhouse Jr., necessitating the sixth caution flag. Larson led most of the drivers down pit road under caution, with Byron driving off before Larson. Stenhouse Jr., Menard, Jones, and Keselowski did not pit and assumed the top-four positions for the restart on the 72nd lap. Heading into the first turn, Jones ran into the left-rear fender of Stenhouse Jr.'s car and was hit from the side by Daniel Suárez, puncturing Jones' left-rear tire, while Kyle Busch bypassed the corner completely; however, NASCAR did not penalize Busch because they felt that he was simply anticipating and avoiding a wreck. Jones then spun in turn 13 and ducked into pit road.

Stenhouse Jr. suddenly got loose while exiting the fourth corner on lap 73 and drove into the grass, allowing Menard, Keselowski, and Larson to take the first three places. Newman was spun out by Bowyer in turn seven the next lap, but quickly refired his car. On the 75th lap, Keselowski closed in on Menard and overtook him for the lead in turn ten. J. J. Yeley drove off-course in the sixth turn on lap 76 and hit a Bojangles sign, which got stuck to the nose of Yeley's car; no caution flag was waved for this incident. Four laps later, Larson got around Menard for second place, but was three seconds behind Keselowski. By lap 84, however, Larson reeled in Keselowski after he drove over the curbing in turn 17 and damaged his splitter two laps prior. Larson out-braked Keselowski in turn one to take the lead, but Keselowski raced to Larson's left side through numerous corners. The two drivers banged doors without losing control and Keselowski eventually pulled ahead of Larson heading into the eighth turn.

Larson approached Keselowski to try to take the lead again on lap 88, but got loose in turn three and backed out. By lap 89, Menard dropped to sixth in the running order, behind Kyle Busch, Truex Jr., and Johnson, while Bowman kicked off the second round of green-flag pit stops. Fellow Playoffs drivers Blaney and Bowyer soon followed on the 90th lap. Over the next 13 laps, Keselowski and Larson let up on their pace as they attempted to save fuel to the end of the race, with Keselowski's team fearing that he would be forced to pit and give up a possible win. The caution was flown for the seventh time on lap 102, when Stenhouse Jr. spun into the turn-one barrier and dealt heavy damage to the right side of his car. Harvick, Logano, Kurt Busch, and others made stops during the caution, but most of the leaders, including Keselowski and Larson, elected to stay out.

On the lap-104 restart, Keselowski applied his brakes too late entering the first corner and slammed nose-first into the tire barrier. Larson, Byron, and Menard followed suit, while Kyle Busch suddenly stopped in front of Hemric, who then spun to the left side of turn one and collected Trevor Bayne, Ty Dillon, Almirola, Wallace, McDowell, and Chastain. Blaney also sustained slight damage in the accident, as the right-front of his car hit the rear bumper of Menard's car. The eighth (and final) caution was waved before being withdrawn for the red flag, which stopped the race to allow track officials to fix the barrier in turn one. The caution was again issued after 14 minutes and 27 seconds, and Larson's team completed extensive repairs to his car in pit road in order to defend his spot in the Round of 12.

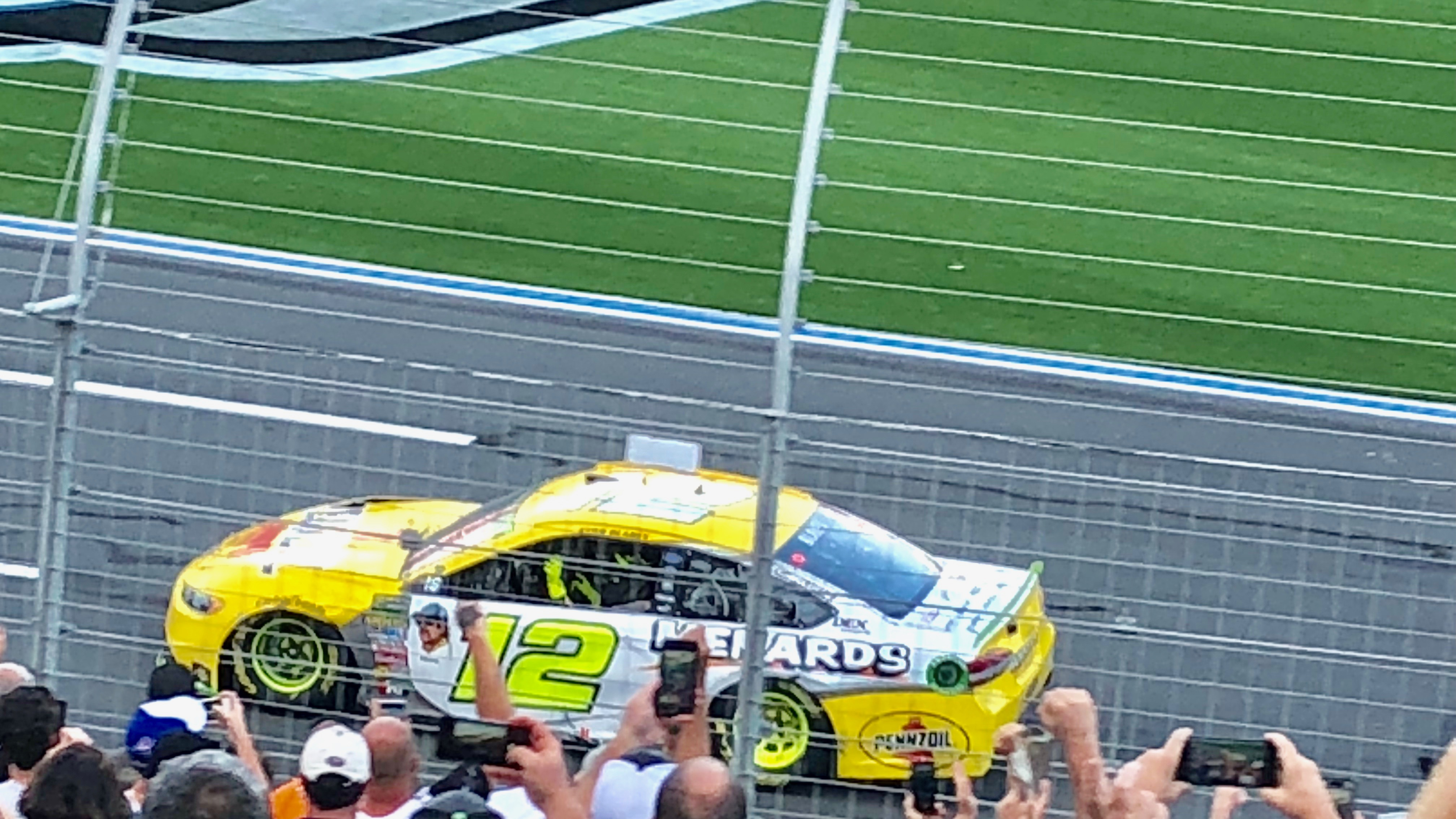
Ryan Blaney driving a Polish victory lap after winning the race.

Racing resumed on lap 107, with Truex Jr. leading Johnson and Elliott, the latter of whom fell to fourth place by the fourth turn after McMurray and Blaney passed him. The following lap, Almirola improved to the 20th position by aggressively overtaking Ty Dillon in turn 16, which gave him the final position for the Round of 12. He then earned an additional point by passing Suárez for 19th on the last lap, which bumped Larson to 13th in the standings. Meanwhile, Johnson remained hot on Truex Jr.'s trail; he swerved to the inside line in turn 14 to set up a pass, but overapplied the brakes and spun directly into the side of Truex Jr.'s car as they approached turn 16, which knocked Truex Jr. towards the outside front stretch wall.

Blaney, running third at the time of the collision, slipped by both drivers to take his second career victory and his first of the season. McMurray finished second, with Bowyer in third, Bowman in fourth, and Kurt Busch rounding out the top-five. Johnson and Truex Jr.'s last-lap spins dropped them to eighth and 14th, respectively. Truex Jr. showed his displeasure towards Johnson by spinning him out in the first turn after the race. Behind them, Jeffrey Earnhardt was spun into the outside wall by Hemric while racing through turn 17. As Earnhardt's car was left stalled on the front stretch apron, Larson began driving faster to pass him for an extra point. Although his right-front tire was punctured and he slammed the outside wall several times, he still managed to get by Earnhardt for a 25th-place finish. This placed Almirola, Larson, and Johnson at a three-way tie for the final two transfer positions for the Round of 12. Johnson lost the tiebreaker to Almirola and Larson because his best finish in the Round of 16 was lower than that of the other two drivers.

== Post-race ==
Blaney celebrated his win with his team in victory lane. During a post-race press conference, Blaney spoke on the circumstances that led to his win: "It is really cool. It’s a different way than I’ve ever won one before in my life. I’ve never been running third and two guys wreck and won. I’ve never had that happen to me before, but it is neat. It’s cool to win the first one." McMurray, who finished second, felt that his car handled well throughout the race, but was slightly disappointed that he did not win because his left-side mirror had fell off with about 25 laps left in the race. Third-placed Bowyer argued that he had passed Blaney when the final caution was issued on lap 104, quipping: "Lucky little turd. That could have been me! Can you protest?" However, he still congratulated Blaney for the win. NASCAR managing director Steve O'Donnell explained that Blaney was allowed to keep his position because he was 3 feet (0.91 m) ahead of Bowyer at the beginning of the lap and continued despite his damage.

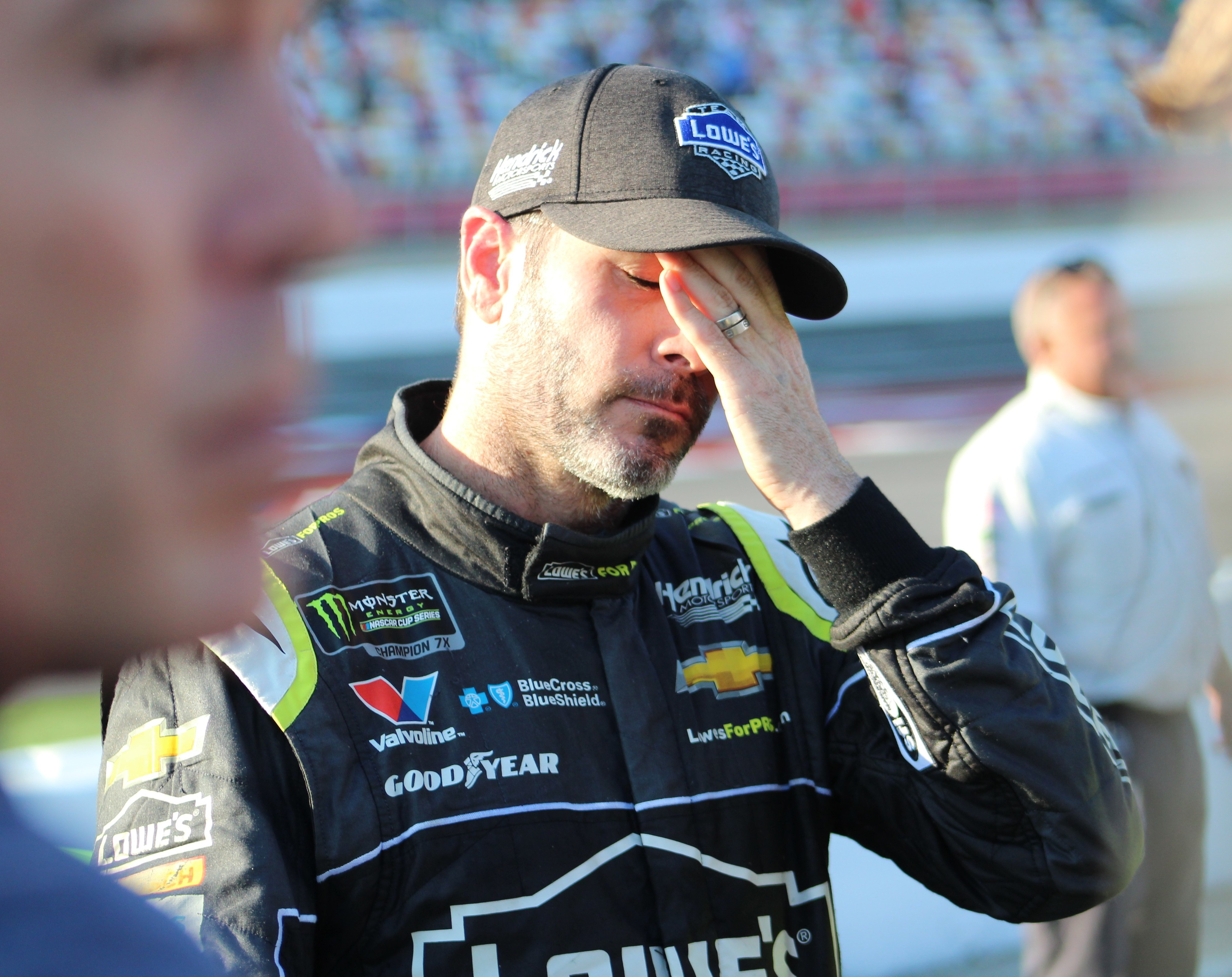
Jimmie Johnson after the race.

Truex Jr. expressed frustration for the last-lap spin with Johnson, commenting: "He just over-drove it and was never going to make it and used me as brakes and turned us both around. It sucks, we could have raced side-by-side off the last corner for a win and that would have been cool. The fans would have been digging it, but instead we finished 14th and he’s locked out of the Playoffs. I guess that’s what he gets." A saddened Johnson was regretful for his spin with Truex Jr., which cost him a spot in the Round of 12: "I wish I wouldn't have been so focused on a race win, and I could have transferred and kept my championship hopes alive, but we had such a good car and just one of those split-second decisions to race for the win instead of for the points—and it bit me." He later issued an apology to Truex Jr. in a tweet, saying: "Everyone makes mistakes… apologies to the 78 and all of their fans." The next day, Johnson tweeted that he should have applied front brake bias heading into turn 16 to race alongside Truex Jr. for the win.

Larson explained his thoughts as he finished the race ahead of Earnhardt: "He was like 100 feet from the start finish line. I could start to see him creep in when I was getting to [turn] 16. I was like, 'Gosh, don't go, don't go,' and we were able to make it. Hey, I was pretty lucky." It was later discovered that Larson was running below the minimum speed at the finish; Steve O'Donnell stated that he was within the three laps required by NASCAR's damaged vehicle policy to meet said speed after rejoining the race, so he was not penalized. Almirola said that he drove aggressively in order to earn as much points as possible and joked: "I was hoping to just get in by plus-one point. Turns out it was plus-zero points." Keselowski was left without much explanation for his wreck on lap 104, but thanked his team for providing a fast backup car. Kyle Busch, who was also involved in the pileup, sarcastically assessed that he and other drivers "all drove off into a 90-degree wall for something to do because we had nothing else better to do."

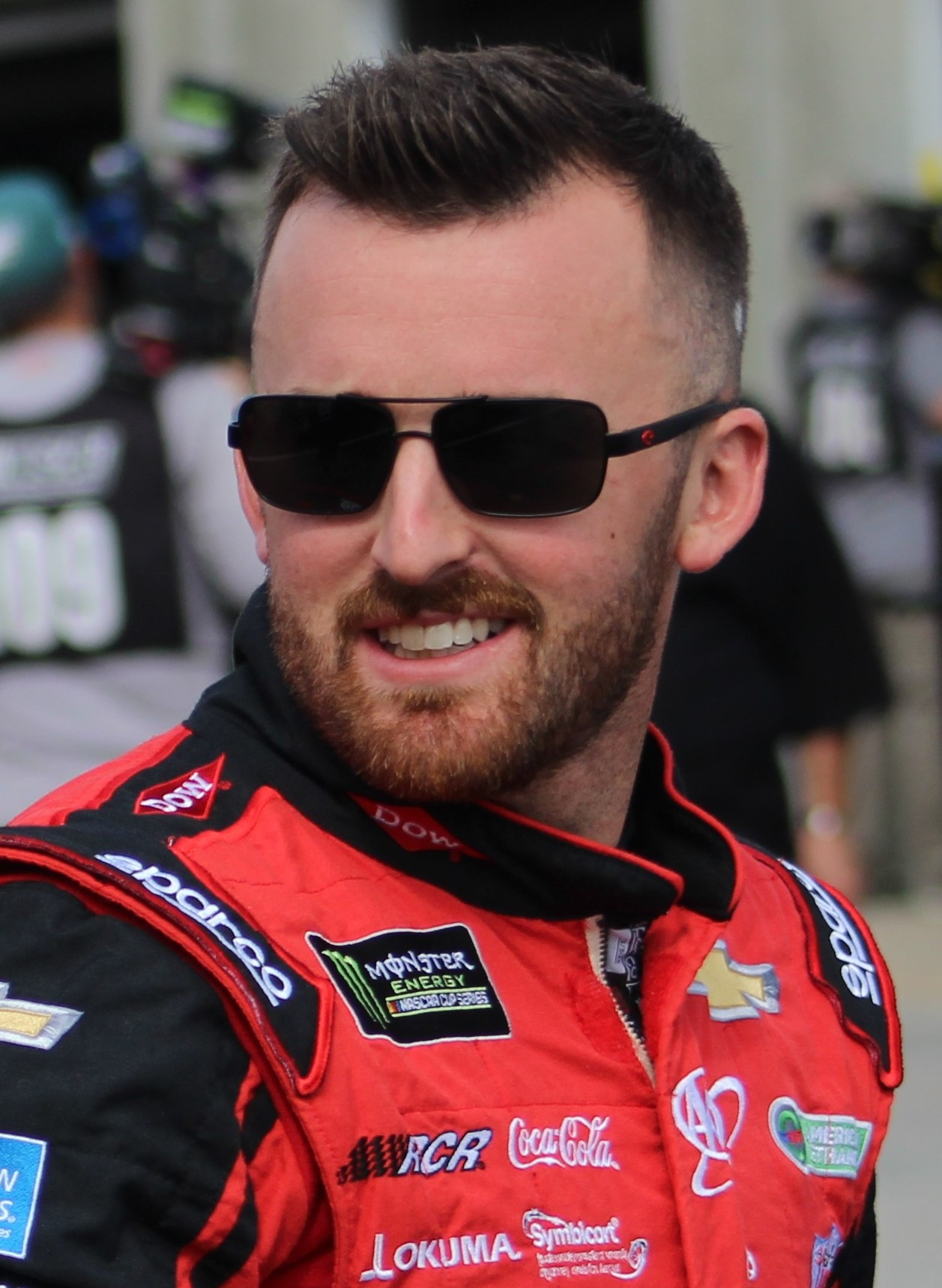
Austin Dillon was one of the four drivers eliminated from the NASCAR Playoffs because of his 39th-place finish.

The first Cup Series race on Charlotte Motor Speeday's roval configuration was positively received by the media. Journalists Beth Lunkenheimer and Amy Henderson of Frontstretch both thanked Marcus Smith for conceiving the idea to race on the circuit. The Charlotte Observer's Brendan Marks lauded the race as a "complete and total success," citing the drama for the final Round of 12 spots and the high attendance. It was also noted that the live broadcast on NBC in the United States earned a rating of 1.95 and averaged 3,218,000 viewers, both of which were increases compared to the 2017 Bank of America 500. In 2023, the event was included in NASCAR's list of their 75 greatest races to commemorate the sport's 75th anniversary. Race winner Blaney thought the track had potential, but the positioning of the curbs needed to be altered because it was "really hard to pass." For 2019, the back stretch chicane was widened from 32 feet (9.8 m) to 54 feet (16 m) and featured additional runoff areas. When asked if the roval layout would be added to other SMI-owned oval tracks in the future, Marcus Smith rejected the idea because he wanted it to be unique to Charlotte Motor Speedway.

For the Drivers' Championship, the top 12 drivers in the standings had their point totals reset to 3,000 points plus the playoff points they had earned throughout the season. As a result, Kyle Busch claimed the lead in the standings with 3,055 points; Truex Jr. trailed him by five points and Truex Jr. fell to third, 17 points in arrears. Brad Keselowski maintained the fourth position on 3,025 points, while Bowyer's 3,015 points advanced him to fifth. Logano, Kurt Busch, Blaney, Elliott, Larson, Almirola, and Bowman rounded out the drivers transferring into the Round of 12. Johnson, Austin Dillon, Hamlin, and Jones were the first four drivers to be eliminated from the Playoffs. Ford had also earned the lead in the Manufacturers' Championship by virtue of their 1,050 points. Toyota was ten points behind in second, with Chevrolet a further 90 points back in third as seven races remained in the season. The lead was changed ten times between eight different drivers during the course of the race. Larson's 47 laps led was the most of any driver; Blaney led twice for a total of 16 laps. The race took three hours, one minute, and 34 seconds to complete, and the margin of victory was 0.792 seconds.

=== Race results ===
Final race results
Pos.	Grid	No.	Driver	Team	Manufacturer	Laps	Points
1	9	12	Ryan Blaney	Team Penske	Ford	109	51^{1}
2	8	1	Jamie McMurray	Chip Ganassi Racing	Chevrolet	109	35
3	7	14	Clint Bowyer	Stewart–Haas Racing	Ford	109	48^{1}
4	3	88	Alex Bowman	Hendrick Motorsports	Chevrolet	109	38^{1}
5	1	41	Kurt Busch	Stewart–Haas Racing	Ford	109	49^{1}
6	4	9	Chase Elliott	Hendrick Motorsports	Chevrolet	109	42^{1}
7	2	47	A. J. Allmendinger	JTG Daugherty Racing	Chevrolet	109	33^{1}
8	6	48	Jimmie Johnson	Hendrick Motorsports	Chevrolet	109	43^{1}
9	19	4	Kevin Harvick	Stewart–Haas Racing	Ford	109	28
10	15	22	Joey Logano	Team Penske	Ford	109	34^{1}
11	29	31	Ryan Newman	Richard Childress Racing	Chevrolet	109	26
12	27	11	Denny Hamlin	Joe Gibbs Racing	Toyota	109	25
13	28	32	Matt DiBenedetto	Go Fas Racing	Ford	109	24
14	13	78	Martin Truex Jr.	Furniture Row Racing	Toyota	109	30^{1}
15	32	95	Regan Smith	Leavine Family Racing	Chevrolet	109	22
16	30	38	David Ragan	Front Row Motorsports	Ford	109	21
17	10	37	Chris Buescher	JTG Daugherty Racing	Chevrolet	109	20
18	18	34	Michael McDowell	Front Row Motorsports	Ford	109	19
19	20	10	Aric Almirola	Stewart–Haas Racing	Ford	109	18
20	33	72	Cole Whitt	TriStar Motorsports	Chevrolet	109	17
21	17	19	Daniel Suárez	Joe Gibbs Racing	Toyota	109	16
22	26	13	Ty Dillon	Germain Racing	Chevrolet	109	15
23	11	8	Daniel Hemric	Richard Childress Racing	Chevrolet	109	0^{2}
24	35	7	Ross Chastain	Premium Motorsports	Chevrolet	109	0^{2}
25	5	42	Kyle Larson	Chip Ganassi Racing	Chevrolet	109	24^{1}
26	37	96	Jeffrey Earnhardt	Gaunt Brothers Racing	Toyota	109	11
27	31	15	Justin Marks	Premium Motorsports	Chevrolet	108	0^{2}
28	36	23	J. J. Yeley	BK Racing	Toyota	108	0^{2}
29	38	00	Landon Cassill	StarCom Racing	Chevrolet	108	0^{2}
30	12	20	Erik Jones	Joe Gibbs Racing	Toyota	108	7
31	25	2	Brad Keselowski	Team Penske	Ford	103	6
32	14	18	Kyle Busch	Joe Gibbs Racing	Toyota	103	9^{1}
33	22	21	Paul Menard	Wood Brothers Racing	Ford	103	4
34	21	24	William Byron	Hendrick Motorsports	Chevrolet	103	3
35	16	6	Trevor Bayne	Roush Fenway Racing	Ford	103	2
36	34	43	Bubba Wallace	Richard Petty Motorsports	Chevrolet	103	1
37	23	17	Ricky Stenhouse Jr.	Roush Fenway Racing	Ford	100	1
38	40	66	Timmy Hill	MBM Motorsports	Toyota	70	0^{2}
39	24	3	Austin Dillon	Richard Childress Racing	Chevrolet	65	5^{1}
40	39	51	Stanton Barrett	Rick Ware Racing	Ford	11	1
^{1} Includes points earned at the end of Stages 1 and 2^{2} Deemed ineligible from earning points in the Cup Series

== Standings after the race ==
Drivers' Championship standings
+/-	Pos.	Driver	Points
1	1	Kyle Busch	3,055
1	2	Kevin Harvick	3,050 (–5)
2	3	Martin Truex Jr.	3,038 (–17)
	4	Brad Keselowski	3,025 (–30)
8	5	Clint Bowyer	3,015 (–40)
1	6	Joey Logano	3,014 (–41)
1	7	Kurt Busch	3,014 (–41)
4	8	Ryan Blaney	3,013 (–42)
	9	Chase Elliott	3,008 (–47)
3	10	Kyle Larson	3,006 (–49)
5	11	Aric Almirola	3,001 (–54)
1	12	Alex Bowman	3,000 (–55)
1	13	Jimmie Johnson	2,097 (–958)
4	14	Austin Dillon	2,071 (–984)
1	15	Denny Hamlin	2,056 (–999)
1	16	Erik Jones	2,046 (–1,009)
Sources:

- Note: Only the top 16 positions are included for the drivers' standings. These drivers qualified for the Playoffs.

Manufacturers' Championship standings
+/-	Pos.	Manufacturer	Points
1	1	Ford	1,050
1	2	Toyota	1,040 (–10)
	3	Chevrolet	950 (–100)

== See also ==
- 2018 Drive for the Cure 200

== Notes and references ==
=== References ===
Previous race: 2018 Federated Auto Parts 400	Monster Energy NASCAR Cup Series; 2018 season	Next race: 2018 Gander Outdoors 400 (Dover)
