= Skid (automobile) =

Automobile handling condition

An automobile skid is an automobile handling condition where one or more tires are slipping relative to the road, and the overall handling of the vehicle has been affected. For other uses of the term “skid”, see skid-mounted equipment used in firefighting and utility vehicle applications.

Subtypes of skid include:

- fishtailing, where the vehicle yaws back and forth across the direction of motion.
- spin or spinout where a vehicle rotates in one direction during the skid.
- understeer and oversteer where front or rear wheels lose traction during cornering, causing a vehicle to follow a larger or smaller turning radius.
- burnout where a vehicle slips or spins its tires during acceleration.
- lockup where a vehicle skids during braking (with or without directional or yaw changes).

== Slip and skid ==
Tire slip, and related slip angle (angle of motion relative to tire), describe the performance of an individual tire. Important concepts about slip and skid include circle of forces or circle of traction, and cornering force. To a first approximation, the tire can withstand approximately the same absolute force relative to the road surface in any direction. Graphically represented, a circle (or ellipse) of force magnitude represents the maximum tire traction, and the force vector can be in any direction up to the limit of the circle without tire slip. A tire that can withstand 0.8 G of force in braking can also withstand 0.8 G of force in turning or in acceleration, or for example approximately 0.56 G of cornering and 0.56 G of braking simultaneously, summing to 0.8 G at a 45-degree angle. Once the force exceeds the limit circle, that tire starts to slip.

Skidding is the vehicle's response to one or more tires slipping. The vehicle dynamics during a skid will depend on whether some or all of the tires are skidding, and whether the car was rotating or turning when the skid began.

=== Road conditions ===
Road surface conditions such as moisture on the road, snow, ice (particularly black ice), debris or sand, oil or other fluids, can cause skidding at much lower force levels or velocities than under normal conditions. Moisture can cause aquaplaning, also known as hydroplaning, where water builds up in front of and under tires and causes loss of tire grip.

== Types ==
=== Fishtailing ===
Fishtailing is a cyclical skid combining alternating oversteer (rear wheel skidding) with overcorrection, leading to oversteer/skidding in the opposite direction.

=== Spin out ===
Spin outs are where the vehicle starts to skid while rotating, or develops significant rotation while skidding, and rotates out of control.

Once the vehicle is rotating sufficiently rapidly, its angular momentum of rotation can overcome the stabilizing influence of the tires (either braking or skidding), and the rotation will continue even if the wheels are centered or past the point that the vehicle is controlled. This can be caused by some tires locking up in braking while others continue to rotate, or under acceleration where driven tires may lose traction (especially, if they lose traction unevenly), or in combining braking or acceleration with turning.

=== Burnout ===
A burnout is when a car intentionally locks the front wheels to hold the car in place while spinning the rear wheels. The dynamic friction of the spinning tire against the road causes significant amounts of the tire's rubber to be deposited onto the road surface, and increased temperature from friction usually creates dense white smoke. It is common in drag racing to heat tires to a more desirable temperature in order to increase traction. Burnouts are usually illegal on the street; drivers engaging in them may be considered a hoon.

=== Skidding during braking ===
This is the simplest type of skid, where directional changes are not relevant, and the vehicle merely locks up the tires moving forwards in a straight line. If all four tires start to skid approximately evenly, then a vehicle will not start rotating due to the skid, and can come to a stop with locked up tires at a somewhat longer distance than threshold braking might have achieved.

== Avoiding and managing skid ==
=== Manual avoidance ===
Threshold braking and cadence braking are two manual techniques used to extract maximum deceleration from a vehicle. Threshold braking maintains a steady braking force with slight (10-20%) slip, around or just below the point of maximum tire grip force. Cadence braking accepts that holding the threshold braking limit is exceptionally hard, and relies on manual manipulation of braking force to rapidly go just above and below the skid point, essentially oscillating between unlocked rolling and locked skidding around the point at which threshold braking would be done. This technique is less effective than threshold braking but much easier to learn.

==== Lockup ====
For deceleration straight ahead, where turning or maneuvering are not required, one technique is to simply accept a skid and lock up the brakes. While ABS or ESC brake systems may perform better, and reduce risk of loss of control, many less skilled drivers will stop faster while locked up than any alternative they can realistically perform. This is not true if the vehicle has to be steered while stopping.

=== Automated systems ===
Electronic stability control or ESC systems, and the older anti-lock brake or ABS systems, perform an automated braking (and for ESC, steering) function using wheel-by-wheel rapid brake pumping, similar to a mixture of threshold and cadence braking on a tire by tire basis.

ABS senses wheel rotation compared to ground velocity, and if the wheel starts to lock up or slip will then rapidly moderate the brakes to let it begin to rotate again. This is done separately for all 4 wheels, and without regard for the rotation of the vehicle.

ESC does the same, but combines that with sensing the steering and yaw or rotation velocity of the vehicle (for example, rotating as it goes around a corner). ESC will go beyond simply avoiding lockup in each tire, to dynamically braking other tires to maintain the existing path of the vehicle.

== See also ==
- Braking distance
- Directional stability
- Road slipperiness
- Vehicle handling
