= Anti-lock braking system =

Safety anti-skid braking system used on aerospace and land vehicles

Symbol for ABS

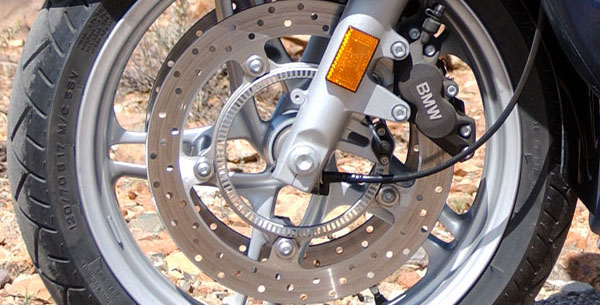
ABS brakes on a BMW motorcycle

An anti-lock braking system (ABS) is a safety anti-skid braking system used on aircraft and on land vehicles, such as cars, motorcycles, trucks, and buses. ABS operates by preventing the wheels from locking up during braking, thereby maintaining tractive contact with the road surface and allowing the driver to maintain more control over the vehicle.

ABS is an automated system that uses the principles of threshold braking and cadence braking, techniques which were once practiced by skillful drivers before ABS was widespread. ABS operates at a much faster rate and more effectively than most drivers could manage. Although ABS generally offers improved vehicle control and decreases stopping distances on dry and some slippery surfaces, on loose gravel or snow-covered surfaces ABS may significantly increase braking distance, while still improving steering control. Since ABS was introduced in production vehicles, such systems have become increasingly sophisticated and effective. Modern versions may not only prevent wheel lock under braking, but may also alter the front-to-rear brake bias. This latter function, depending on its specific capabilities and implementation, is known variously as electronic brakeforce distribution, traction control system, emergency brake assist, or electronic stability control (ESC).

== History ==
=== Early systems ===
The concept for ABS predates the modern systems that were introduced in the 1950s. In 1908, for example, J.E. Francis introduced his slip prevention regulator for rail vehicles.

In 1920 the French automobile and aircraft pioneer Gabriel Voisin experimented with systems that modulated the hydraulic braking pressure on his aircraft brakes to reduce the risk of tire slippage, as threshold braking on aircraft is nearly impossible. These systems used a flywheel and valve attached to a hydraulic line that feeds the brake cylinders. The flywheel is attached to a drum that runs at the same speed as the wheel. In normal braking, the drum and flywheel should spin at the same speed. However, when a wheel slows down, then the drum would do the same, leaving the flywheel spinning at a faster rate. This causes the valve to open, allowing a small amount of brake fluid to bypass the master cylinder into a local reservoir, lowering the pressure on the cylinder and releasing the brakes. The use of the drum and flywheel meant the valve only opened when the wheel was turning. In testing, a 30% improvement in braking performance was noted, because the pilots immediately applied full brakes instead of slowly increasing pressure in order to find the skid point. An additional benefit was the elimination of burned or burst tires.

The first proper recognition of the ABS system came later with the German engineer Karl Wässel, whose system for modulating braking power was officially patented in 1928. Wässel, however, never developed a working product and neither did Robert Bosch who produced a similar patent eight years later.

A similar braking system called Decelostat that used direct-current generators to measure wheel slippage was used in railroads in the 1930s. By 1951, flywheel-based Decelostat was used in aircraft to provide anti skid in landings. The device was on trials first in the United States and later by the British. In 1954, Popular Science revealed that there was preliminary testing of the Decelostat system to prevent car swirling on a heavy brake by the US car manufacturers in Detroit. However, there was no public information of the test results.

By the early 1950s, the Dunlop Maxaret anti-skid system was in widespread aviation use in the UK, with aircraft such as the Avro Vulcan and Handley Page Victor, Vickers Viscount, Vickers Valiant, English Electric Lightning, de Havilland Comet 2c, de Havilland Sea Vixen, and later aircraft, such as the Vickers VC10, Hawker Siddeley Trident, Hawker Siddeley 125, Hawker Siddeley HS 748 and derived British Aerospace ATP, and BAC One-Eleven, and the Dutch Fokker F27 Friendship (which unusually had a Dunlop high pressure (200 bar) pneumatic system in lieu of hydraulics for braking, nose wheel steering and landing gear retraction), being fitted with Maxaret as standard. Maxaret, while reducing braking distances by up to 30% in icy or wet conditions, also increased tire life, and had the additional advantage of allowing take-offs and landings in conditions that would preclude flying at all in non-Maxaret equipped aircraft.

In 1958, a Royal Enfield Super Meteor motorcycle was used by the Road Research Laboratory to test the Maxaret anti-lock brake. The experiments demonstrated that anti-lock brakes can be of great value to motorcycles, for which skidding is involved in a high proportion of accidents. Stopping distances were reduced in most of the tests compared with locked wheel braking, particularly on slippery surfaces, in which the improvement could be as much as 30%. Enfield's technical director at the time, Tony Wilson-Jones, saw little future in the system, however, and it was not put into production by the company.

A fully-mechanical system saw limited automobile use in the 1960s in the Ferguson P99 racing car, the Jensen FF, and the experimental all-wheel drive Ford Zodiac, but saw no further use; the system proved expensive and unreliable.

The first fully-electronic anti-lock braking system was developed in the late-1960s for the Concorde aircraft.

The modern ABS system was invented in 1971 by Mario Palazzetti (known as 'Mister ABS') in the Fiat Research Center and has become standard in almost every car. The system was called Antiskid and the patent was sold to Bosch who named it ABS.

=== Modern systems ===
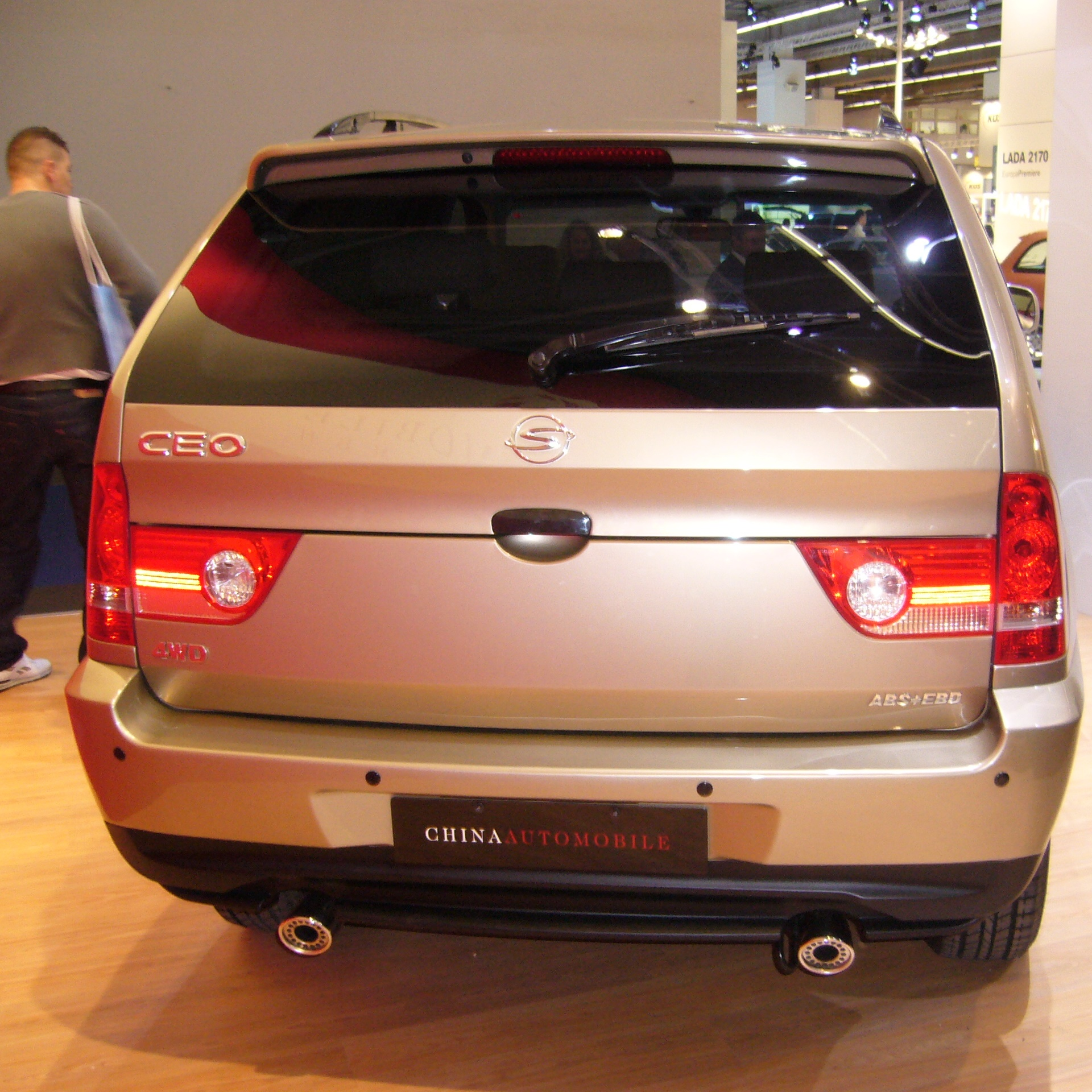
A car with badging indicating the presence of ABS and EBD

Chrysler, together with the Bendix Corporation, introduced a computerized, three-channel, four-sensor all-wheel ABS called "Sure Brake" for its 1971 Imperial. It was available until 1973, and while not a popular option, it functioned as intended and proved reliable. In 1969, Ford introduced an anti-lock braking system called "Sure-Track" to the rear wheels of the Lincoln Continental Mark III and Ford Thunderbird, as an option; it became standard in 1971. The Sure-Track braking system was designed with help from Kelsey-Hayes. In 1971, General Motors introduced the "Trackmaster" rear-wheel only ABS as an option on their rear-wheel drive Cadillac models and called the option the True-Track Braking System on the Oldsmobile Toronado. In 1972, the option was made available in all Cadillacs. In 1971, Nissan offered an EAL (Electro Anti-lock System) developed by Japanese company Denso as an option on the Nissan President, which became Japan's first electronic ABS.

1971: The Imperial became the first production car with a 4 wheel computer-operated anti-lock braking system. Toyota introduced electronically controlled anti-skid brakes on Toyota Crown labeled as ESC (Electronic Skid Control).

1971: First truck application: "Antislittamento" system developed by Fiat Veicoli Industriali and installed on Fiat truck model 691N1.

1972: four-wheel-drive Triumph 2500 Estates were fitted with Mullard electronic systems as standard. Such cars were rare however and very few remain.

1976: WABCO began the development of the anti-locking braking system on commercial vehicles to prevent locking on slippery roads, followed in 1986 by the electronic braking system (EBS) for heavy-duty vehicles.

1978: Mercedes-Benz W116 As one of the firsts, used an electronic four-wheel multi-channel anti-lock braking system (ABS) from Bosch as an option from 1978 on.

1982: Honda introduced electronically controlled multi-channel ALB (Anti Locking Brakes) as an option for the second generation of Prelude, launched worldwide in 1982. Additional info: the general agent for Honda in Norway required all Preludes for the Norwegian market to have the ALB-system as a standard feature, making Honda Prelude be the first car delivered in Europe with ABS as a standard feature. The Norwegian general agent also included a sunroof and other options to be standard equipment in Norway, adding more luxury to the Honda brand. However, the Norwegian tax system made the well-equipped car very expensive, and the sales suffered from high costs. From 1984 the ALB-system, as well as the other optional features from Honda, was no longer a standard feature in Norway.

In 1985 the Ford Scorpio was introduced to the European market with a Teves electronic system throughout the range as standard. For this the model was awarded the coveted European Car of the Year Award in 1986, with very favorable praise from motoring journalists. After this success, Ford began research into Anti-Lock systems for the rest of their range, which encouraged other manufacturers to follow suit.

Since 1984 ABS has been standard equipment on all Mercedes-Benz automobiles. Lincoln followed suit in 1993.

In 1988, BMW introduced the first motorcycle with an electro-hydraulic ABS: the BMW K100. Yamaha Introduced the FJ1200 model with optional ABS in 1991. Honda followed suit in 1992 with the launch of its first motorcycle ABS on the ST1100 Pan European. In 2007, Suzuki launched its GSF1200SA (Bandit) with an ABS. In 2005, Harley-Davidson began offering an ABS option on police bikes.

== Operation ==
The anti-lock brake controller is also known as the CAB (Controller Anti-lock Brake).

Typically ABS includes a central electronic control unit (ECU), four wheel speed sensors, and at least two hydraulic valves within the brake hydraulics. The ECU constantly monitors the rotational speed of each wheel; if it detects the wheel rotating significantly slower than the speed of the vehicle, a condition indicative of impending wheel lock, it actuates the valves to reduce hydraulic pressure to the brake at the affected wheel, thus reducing the braking force on that wheel; the wheel then turns faster. Conversely, if the ECU detects a wheel turning significantly faster than the others, brake hydraulic pressure to the wheel is increased so the braking force is reapplied, slowing down the wheel. This process is repeated continuously and can be detected by the driver via brake pedal pulsation. Some anti-lock systems can apply or release braking pressure 15 times per second. Because of this, the wheels of cars equipped with ABS are practically impossible to lock even during panic braking in extreme conditions.

The ECU is programmed to disregard differences in wheel rotative speed below a critical threshold because when the car is turning, the two wheels towards the center of the curve turn slower than the outer two. For this same reason, a differential is used in virtually all roadgoing vehicles.

If a fault develops in any part of the ABS, a warning light will usually be illuminated on the vehicle instrument panel, and the ABS will be disabled until the fault is rectified.

Modern ABS applies individual brake pressure to all four wheels through a control system of hub-mounted sensors and a dedicated micro-controller. ABS is offered or comes standard on most road vehicles and is the foundation for electronic stability control systems, which are rapidly increasing in popularity due to the great reduction in the price of vehicle electronics over the years.

Modern electronic stability control (ESC) systems are an evolution of the ABS concept. Here, a minimum of two additional sensors are added to help the system work: these are a steering wheel angle sensor and a gyroscopic sensor. The theory of operation is simple: when the gyroscopic sensor detects that the direction taken by the car does not coincide with what the steering wheel sensor reports, the ESC software will brake the necessary individual wheels (up to three with the most sophisticated systems), so that the vehicle goes the way the driver intends. The steering wheel sensor also helps in the operation of Cornering Brake Control (CBC), since this will tell the ABS that wheels on the inside of the curve should brake more than wheels on the outside, and by how much.

ABS equipment may also be used to implement a traction control system (TCS) on the acceleration of the vehicle. If, when accelerating, the tire loses traction, the ABS controller can detect the situation and take suitable action so that traction is regained. More sophisticated versions of this can also control throttle levels and brakes simultaneously.

The speed sensors of ABS are sometimes used in indirect tire pressure monitoring system (TPMS), which can detect under-inflation of the tires by the difference in the rotational speed of wheels.

== Components ==
There are four main components of ABS: wheel speed sensors, valves, a pump, and a controller.

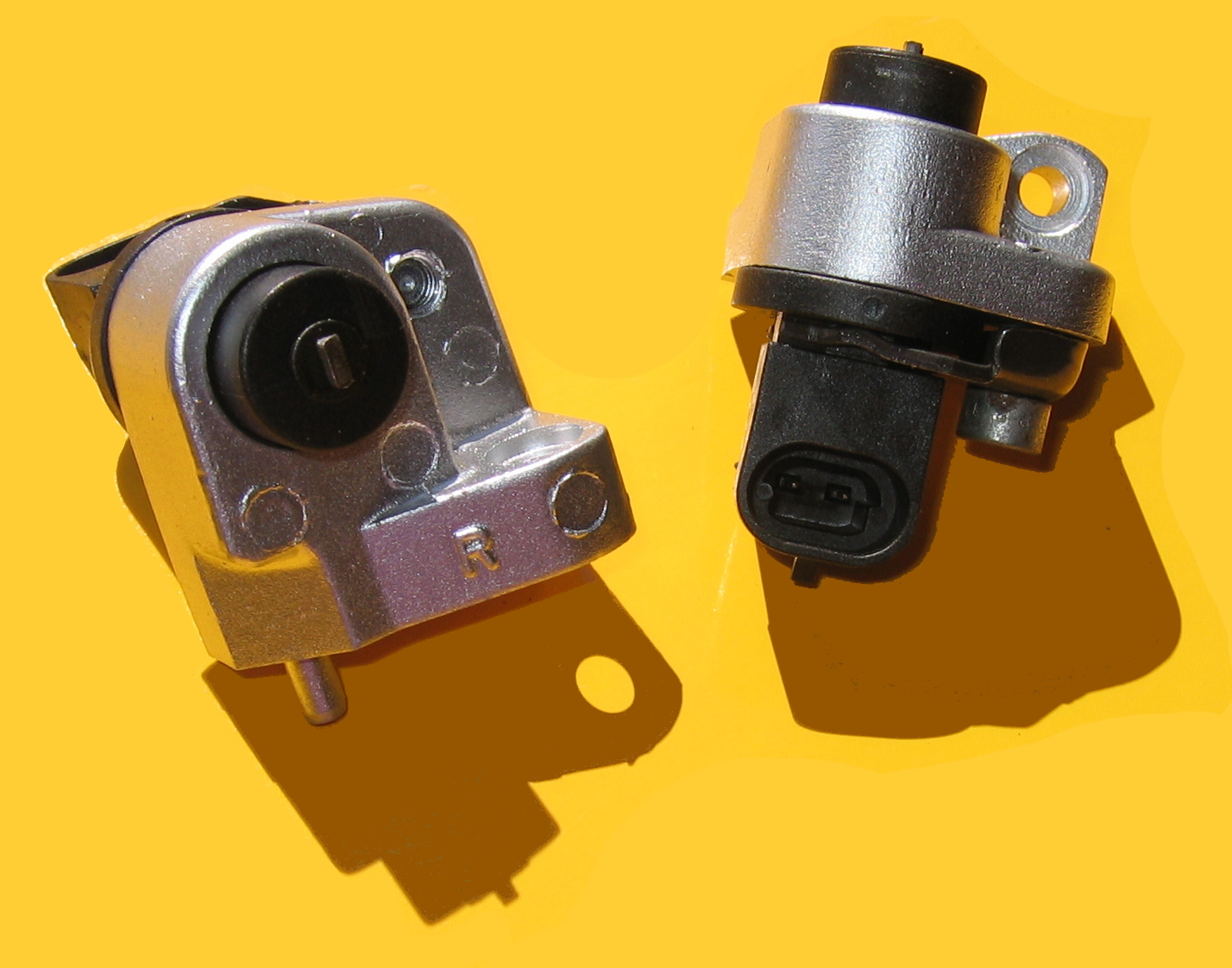
ABS speed sensors

Speed sensors (Encoders)
A speed sensor is used to determine the acceleration or deceleration of the wheel. These sensors use a magnet and a Hall-effect sensor, or a variable reluctance sensor and an electromagnetic coil to generate a signal. The rotation of the wheel or differential induces a magnetic field around the sensor. The fluctuations of this magnetic field generate a voltage in the sensor. Since the voltage induced in the sensor is a result of the rotating wheel, this sensor can become inaccurate at slow speeds. The slower rotation of the wheel can cause inaccurate fluctuations in the magnetic field and thus cause inaccurate readings to the controller.
Valves
There is a valve in the brake line of each brake controlled by the ABS. On some systems, the valve has three positions:

- In position one, the valve is open; pressure from the master cylinder is passed right through to the brake.
- In position two, the valve blocks the line, isolating that brake from the master cylinder. This prevents the pressure from rising further should the driver push the brake pedal harder.
- In position three, the valve releases some of the pressure from the brake.

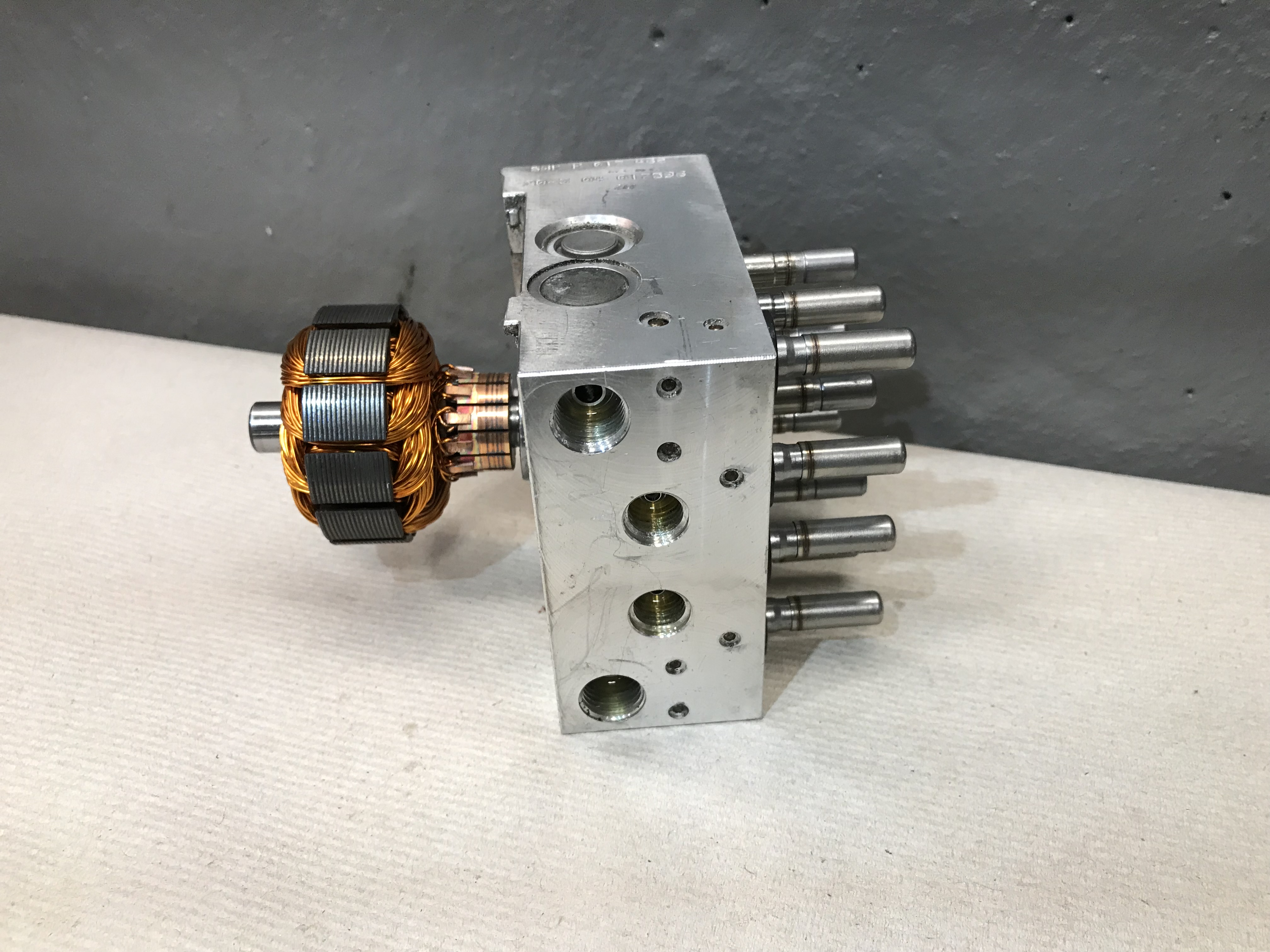
Partially disassembled four-channel hydraulic control unit containing motor, pump and valves

The majority of problems with the valve system occur due to clogged valves. When a valve is clogged it is unable to open, close, or change position. An inoperable valve will prevent the system from modulating the valves and controlling pressure supplied to the brakes.

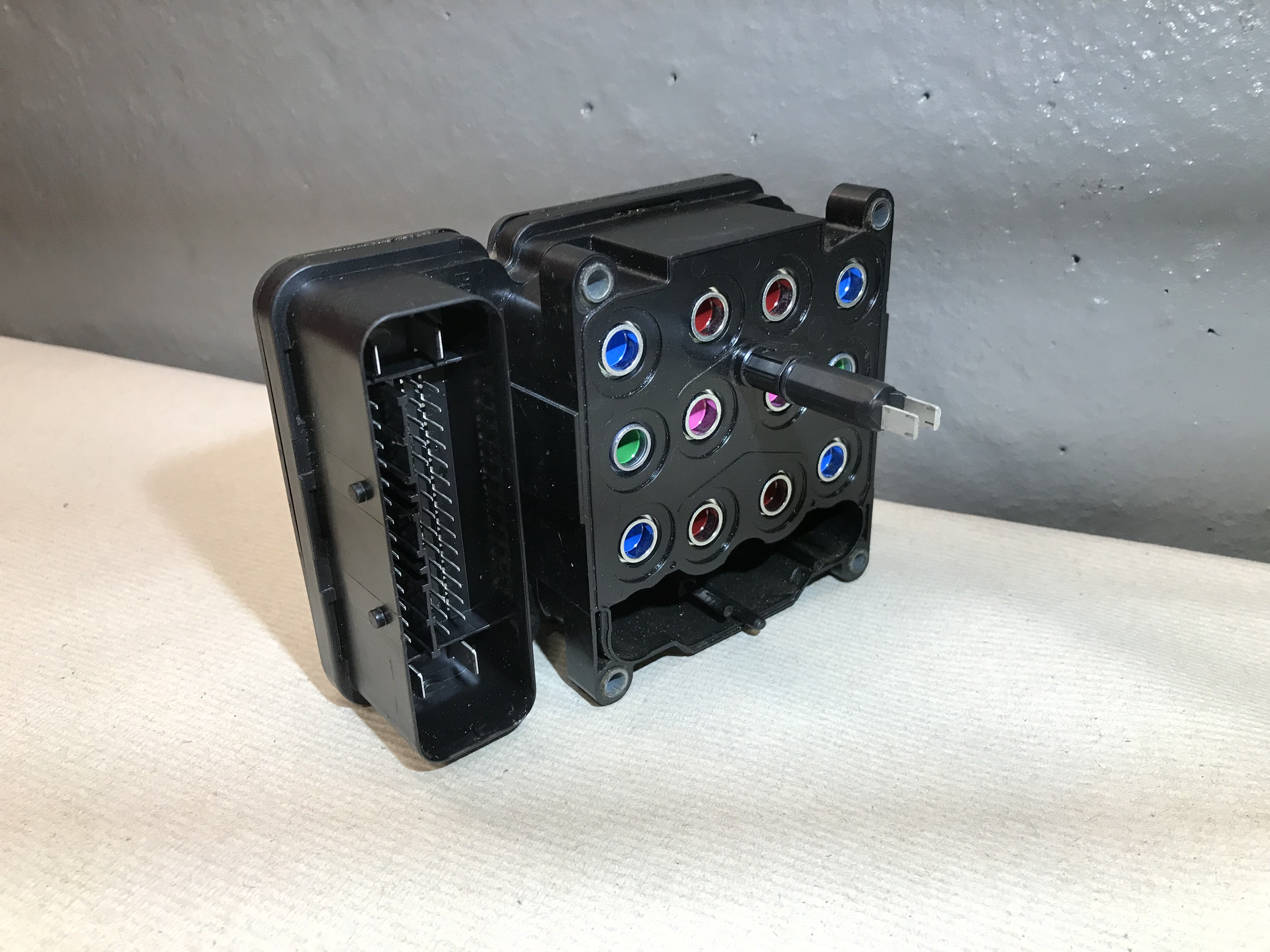
Electronic control module

Pump
The pump in the ABS is used to restore the pressure to the hydraulic brakes after the valves have released it. A signal from the controller will release the valve at the detection of wheel slip. After a valve releases the pressure supplied from the user, the pump is used to restore the desired amount of pressure to the braking system. The controller will modulate the pump's status in order to provide the desired amount of pressure and reduce slipping.
Controller
The controller is an ECU type unit in the car which receives information from each individual wheel speed sensor. If a wheel loses traction, the signal is sent to the controller. The controller will then limit the brake force (EBD) and activate the ABS modulator which actuates the braking valves on and off.

== Use ==
There are many different variations and control algorithms for use in ABS. One of the simpler systems works as follows:

1. The controller monitors the speed sensors at all times. It is looking for decelerations in the wheel that are out of the ordinary. Right before a wheel locks up, it will experience a rapid deceleration. If left unchecked, the wheel would stop much more quickly than any car could. It might take a car two to four seconds to stop from 60 mph (96.6 km/h) under ideal conditions, but a wheel that locks up could stop spinning in less than a second.
2. The ABS controller knows that such a rapid deceleration of the car is impossible (and in actuality the rapid deceleration means the wheel is about to slip), so it reduces the pressure to that brake until it sees an acceleration, then it increases the pressure until it sees the deceleration again. It can do this very quickly before the wheel can actually significantly change speed. The result is that the wheel slows down at the same rate as the car, with the brakes keeping the wheels very near the point at which they will start to lock up. This gives the system maximum braking power.
3. This replaces the need to manually pump the brakes while driving on a slippery or a low traction surface, allowing to steer even in most emergency braking conditions.
4. When the ABS is in operation the driver will feel a pulsing in the brake pedal; this comes from the rapid opening and closing of the valves. This pulsing also tells the driver that the ABS has been triggered.

== Brake types ==
Anti-lock braking systems use different schemes depending on the type of brakes in use. They can be differentiated by the number of channels: that is, how many valves that are individually controlled—and the number of speed sensors.

1) Four-channel, four-sensor ABS
There is a speed sensor on all four wheels and a separate valve for all four wheels. With this setup, the controller monitors each wheel individually to make sure it is achieving maximum braking force.
2) Three-channel, four-sensor ABS
There is a speed sensor on all four wheels and a separate valve for each of the front wheels, but only one valve for both of the rear wheels. Older vehicles with four-wheel ABS usually use this type.
3) Three-channel, three-sensor ABS
This scheme, commonly found on pickup trucks with four-wheel ABS, has a speed sensor and a valve for each of the front wheels, with one valve and one sensor for both rear wheels. The speed sensor for the rear wheels is located in the rear axle. This system provides individual control of the front wheels, so they can both achieve maximum braking force. The rear wheels, however, are monitored together; they both have to start to lock up before the ABS will activate on the rear. With this system, it is possible that one of the rear wheels will lock during a stop, reducing brake effectiveness. This system is easy to identify, as there are no individual speed sensors for the rear wheels.
4) Two-channel, four-sensor ABS
This system, commonly found on passenger cars from the late '80s through the mid-1990s, uses a speed sensor at each wheel, with one control valve each for the front and rear wheels as a pair. If the speed sensor detects lock up at any individual wheel, the control module pulses the valve for both wheels on that end of the car.
5) One-channel, one-sensor ABS
This system is commonly found on pickup trucks, SUVs, and vans with rear-wheel ABS. It has one valve, which controls both rear wheels, and a one-speed sensor, for the rear axle. This system operates the same as the rear end of a three-channel system. The rear wheels are monitored together and they both have to start to lock up before the ABS kicks in. In this system it is also possible that one of the rear wheels will lock, reducing brake effectiveness. This system is also easy to identify, as there are no individual speed sensors for any of the wheels.

== Effectiveness ==
A 2004 Australian study by Monash University Accident Research Centre found that ABS:

- Reduced the risk of multiple vehicle crashes by 18 percent,
- Increased the risk of run-off-road crashes by 35 percent.

On high-traction surfaces such as bitumen, or concrete, many (though not all) ABS-equipped cars are able to attain braking distances better (i.e., shorter) than those that would be possible without the benefit of ABS. In real-world conditions, even an alert and experienced driver without ABS would find it difficult to match or improve on the performance of a typical driver with a modern ABS-equipped vehicle. ABS reduces the chances of crashing and the severity of impact. The recommended technique for non-expert drivers in an ABS-equipped car, in a typical full-braking emergency, is to press the brake pedal as firmly as possible and, where appropriate, to steer around obstructions. In such situations, ABS will significantly reduce the chances of a skid and subsequent loss of control.

In gravel, sand, and deep snow, ABS tends to increase braking distances. On these surfaces, locked wheels dig in and stop the vehicle more quickly. ABS prevents this from occurring. Some ABS calibrations reduce this problem by slowing the cycling time, thus letting the wheels repeatedly briefly lock and unlock. Some vehicle manufacturers provide an "off-road" button to turn the ABS function off. The primary benefit of ABS on such surfaces is to increase the ability of the driver to maintain control of the car rather than go into a skid, though the loss of control remains more likely on soft surfaces such as gravel or on slippery surfaces such as snow or ice. On a very slippery surface such as sheet ice or gravel, it is possible to lock multiple wheels at once, and this can defeat ABS (which relies on comparing all four wheels and detecting individual wheels skidding). The availability of ABS relieves most drivers from learning threshold braking.

A June 1999 National Highway Traffic Safety Administration (NHTSA) study found that ABS increased stopping distances on loose gravel by an average of 27.2 percent.

According to the NHTSA,

"ABS works with your regular braking system by automatically pumping them. In vehicles not equipped with ABS, the driver has to manually pump the brakes to prevent wheel lockup. In vehicles equipped with ABS, your foot should remain firmly planted on the brake pedal, while ABS pumps the brakes for you so you can concentrate on steering to safety."

When activated, some earlier ABSes caused the brake pedal to pulse noticeably. As most drivers rarely or do not brake hard enough to cause brake lock-up, and drivers typically do not read the vehicle's owner's manual, this may not be noticeable until an emergency. Some manufacturers have therefore implemented a brake assist system that determines that the driver is attempting a "panic stop" (by detecting that the brake pedal was depressed very quickly, unlike a normal stop where the pedal pressure would usually be gradually increased. Some systems additionally monitor the rate at the accelerator was released, or the time between accelerator release and brake application) and the system automatically increases braking force where not enough pressure is applied. Hard or panic braking on bumpy surfaces, because of the bumps causing the speed of the wheels to become erratic may also trigger the ABS, sometimes causing the system to enter its ice mode, where the system severely limits maximum available braking power. Nevertheless, ABS significantly improves safety and control for drivers in most on-road situations.

Anti-lock brakes are the subject of some experiments centred around risk compensation theory, which asserts that drivers adapt to the safety benefit of ABS by driving more aggressively. In a Munich study, half a fleet of taxicabs was equipped with anti-lock brakes, while the other half had conventional brake systems. The crash rate was substantially the same for both types of cab, and Wilde concludes this was due to drivers of ABS-equipped cabs taking more risks, assuming that ABS would take care of them, while the non-ABS drivers drove more carefully since ABS would not be there to help in case of a dangerous situation.

The Insurance Institute for Highway Safety released a study in 2010 that found motorcycles with ABS 37% less likely to be involved in a fatal crash than models without ABS.

== ABS on motorcycles ==
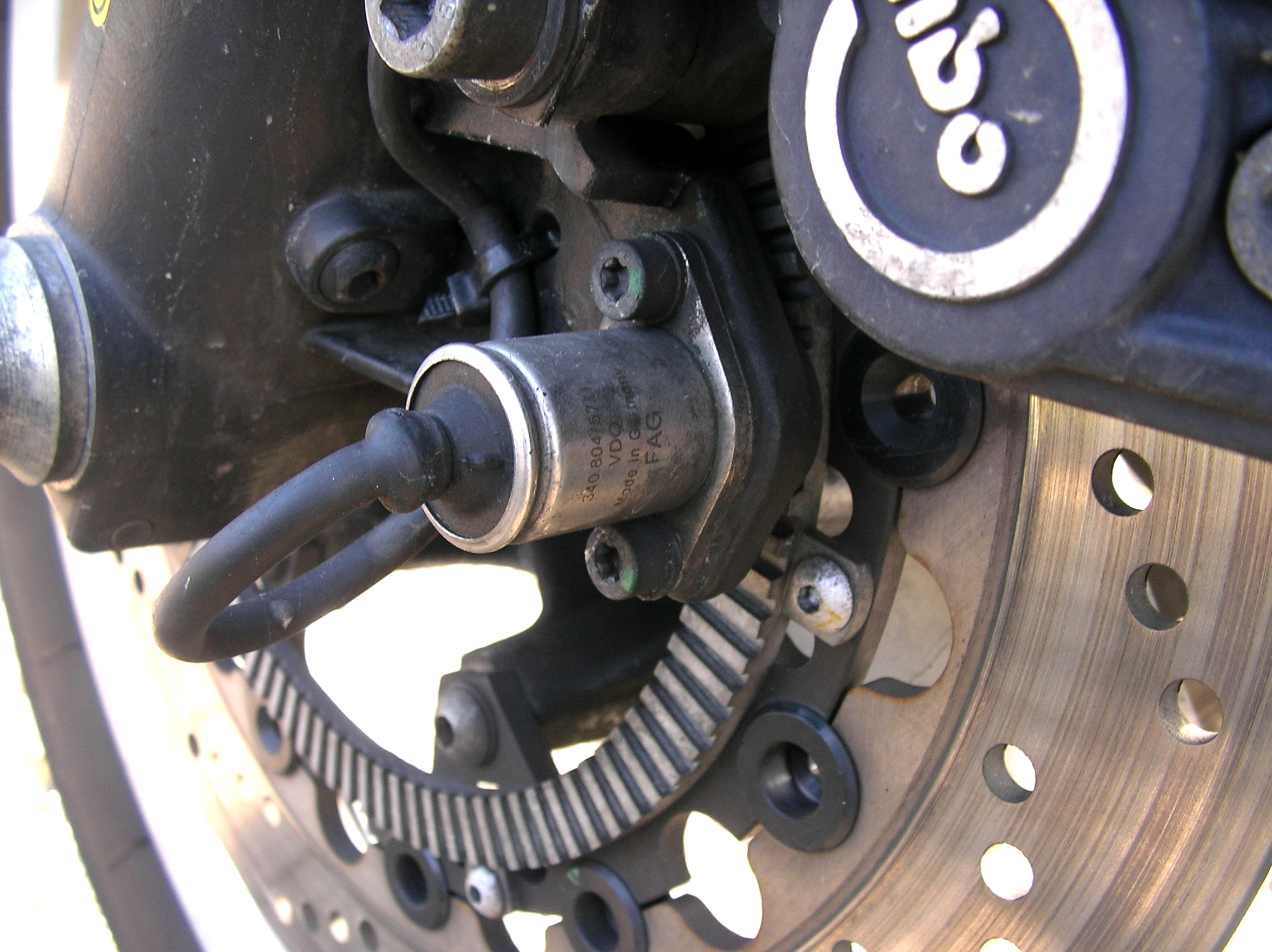
The ABS sensor of a BMW K 1100 LT

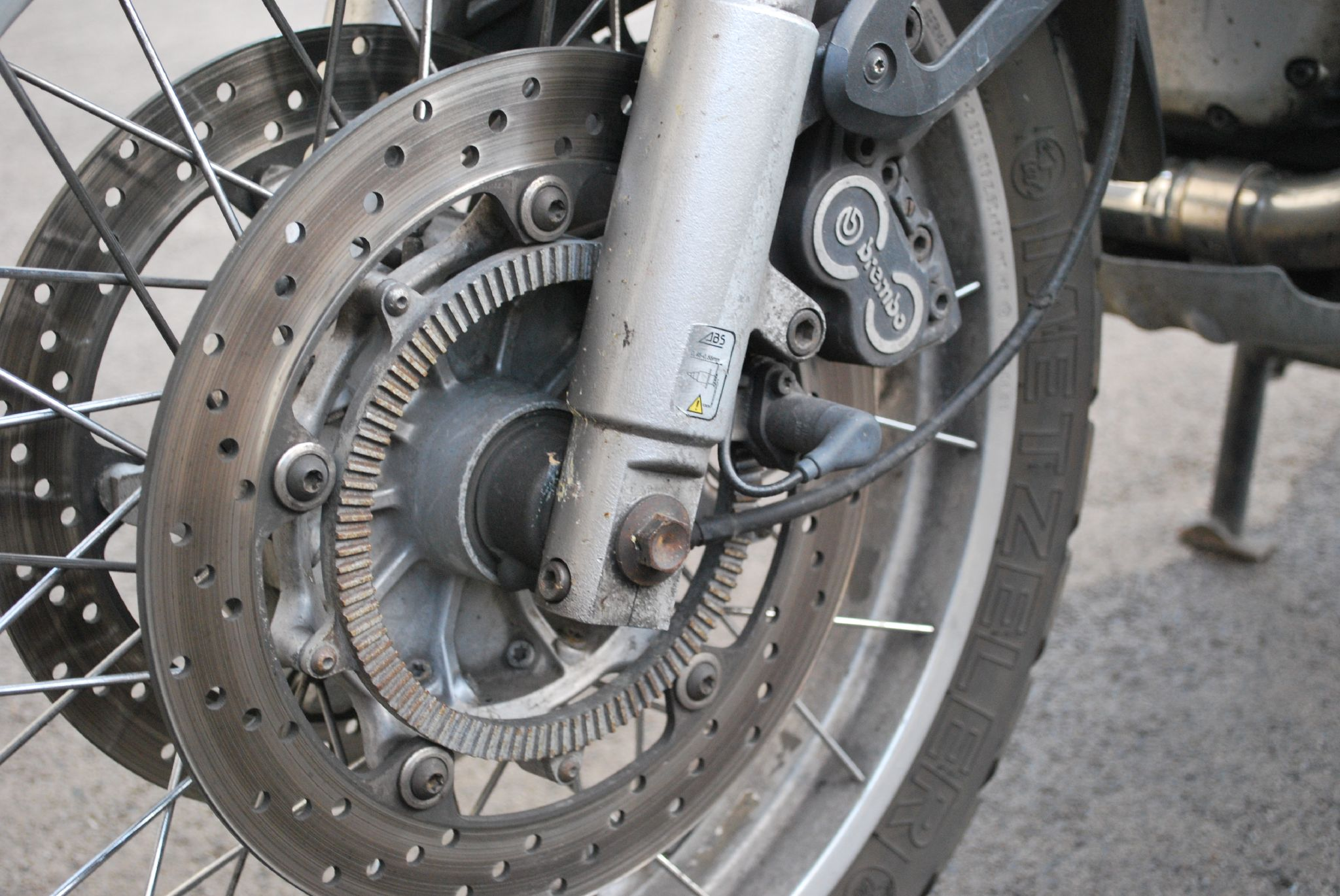
A toothed-wheel ABS sensor. These are the front brake discs on a BMW R1150GS. The toothed ABS ring indicates that this bike was manufactured before November 2002.

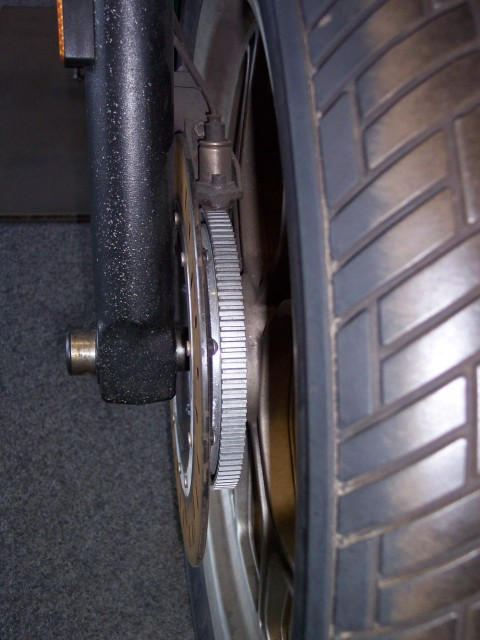
Another toothed-wheel ABS sensor. This is on a BMW K75 motorcycle.

On a motorcycle, an anti-lock brake system prevents the wheels of a motorcycle from locking during braking situations. Based on information from wheel speed sensors the ABS unit adjusts the pressure of the brake fluid in order to keep traction during deceleration to avoid accidents. Motorcycle ABS helps the rider to maintain stability during braking and to decrease the stopping distance. It provides traction even on low friction surfaces.

While older ABS models are derived from cars, recent Motorcycle ABS is the result of research, oriented to the specifics of motorcycles in case of size, weight, and functionality. National and international organizations have evaluated Motorcycle ABS to be an important factor in increasing safety and reducing the number and severity of motorcycle crashes and collisions. The European Commission passed legislation in 2012 that made the fitment with ABS for all new motorcycles above 125cc to be mandatory from 1 January 2016. Consumer Reports said in 2016 that "ABS is commonly offered on large, expensive models, but it has been spreading to several entry-level sportbikes and midsized bikes".

=== History of motorcycle ABS ===
In 1988, BMW introduced an electronic/hydraulic ABS for motorcycles, ten years after Daimler Benz and Bosch released the first four-wheel vehicle ABS for series production. Motorcycles of BMW K100 series were optionally equipped with the ABS, which added 11 kg to the bike. It was developed together with FAG Kugelfischer and regulated the pressure in the braking circuits via a plunger piston. Japanese manufacturers followed with an ABS option by 1992 on the Honda ST1100 and the Yamaha FJ1200.

Continental presented its first Motorcycle Integral ABS (MIB) in 2006. It has been developed in cooperation with BMW and weighed 2.3 kg. While the first generation of motorcycle ABS weighed around 11 kg, the generation (2011) presented by Bosch in 2009 weighs 0.7 kg (ABS base) and 1.6 kg (ABS enhanced) with integral braking.

=== Basic principle ===
Wheel speed sensors mounted on the front and rear wheel constantly measures the rotational speed of each wheel and delivers this information to an Electronic Control Unit (ECU). The ECU detects two things: 1) if the deceleration of one wheel exceeds a fixed threshold and 2) whether the brake slip, calculated based on information of both wheels, rises above a certain percentage and enters an unstable zone. These are indicators for a high possibility of a locking wheel. To countermeasure these irregularities the ECU signals the hydraulic unit to hold or to release pressure. After signals show the return to the stable zone, the pressure is increased again. Past models used a piston for the control of the fluid pressure. Most recent models regulate the pressure by rapidly opening and closing solenoid valves. While the basic principle and architecture has been carried over from passenger car ABS, typical motorcycle characteristics have to be considered during the development and application processes. One characteristic is the change of the dynamic wheel load during braking. Compared to cars, the wheel load changes are more drastic, which can lead to a wheel lift up and a fall over. This can be intensified by a soft suspension. Some systems are equipped with a rear-wheel lift-off mitigation functionality. When the indicators of a possible rear lift-off are detected, the system releases brake pressure on the front wheel to counter this behavior. Another difference is that in the case of the motorcycle the front wheel is much more important for stability than the rear wheel. If the front wheel locks up between 0.2-0.7s, it loses gyrostatic forces and the motorcycle starts to oscillate because of the increased influence of side forces operating on the wheel contact line. The motorcycle becomes unstable and falls.

=== Anti-lock Braking System (ABS) ===
Piston Systems: The pressure release in this system is realized through the movement of a spring-tensioned piston. When pressure should be released, a linear motor pulls back the plunger piston and opens up more space for the fluid. The system was used for example in the ABS I (1988) and ABS II (1993) of BMW. The ABS II differed in size and an electronically controlled friction clutch was mounted on the shaft instead of a plunger. Further displacement sensors record the travel distance of the piston to allow the control unit a more precise regulation. Honda also uses this system of pressure modulation for big sports and touring bikes.

Valve and Pump Systems: The main parts which are part of the pressure modulation system are solenoid inlet and outlet valves, a pump, motor, and accumulators/reservoirs. The number of the valves differs from model to model due to additional functionalities and the number of brake channels. Based on the input of the ECU, coils operate the inlet and outlet valves. During pressure release, the brake fluid is stored in accumulators. In this open system approach, the fluid is then brought back in the brake circuit via a pump operated by a motor that is felt through pulsation on the brake lever.

=== Regenerative Anti-Lock Braking for Electric 2-wheel vehicles (eABS) ===
Electric vehicles can recapture the energy from rear wheel braking.

=== Combined Braking System (CBS) ===
Contrary to how the wheels on cars and trains react collectively to brakes when applied, on motorcycles the rear wheel brake and front wheel brake are controlled separately. If the rider only brakes with one wheel, this braked wheel tends to lock up faster than if both brakes had been applied. A Combined Braking System therefore distributes the brake force also to the non-braked wheel to lower the possibility of a lock-up, increase deceleration and reduce suspension pitch.

With a single [rear] CBS the brake pressure applied on the rear brake (pedal) is simultaneously distributed to the front wheel. A delay valve cuts the hydraulic pressure to assure that only when strong braking is applied, the pressure is also created at the front wheel. Honda's first street motorcycle with a combined braking system (then called Unified Braking) was the 1983 GL1100. This system was derived from the 1970s RCB1000 world endurance race bike.

Larger models with two front discs use a dual CBS System. The system was first installed by Moto Guzzi in 1975. Here, applied brake pressure at the front is also applied to the rear wheel and vice versa. If the front lever is applied, the pressure is built up at 4 of the 6 pots in the 2 calipers at the front. A secondary master cylinder at the front wheel distributes remaining pressure to the rear wheel through a proportional control valve and acts on 2 of the 3 calipers. If a strong brake force is applied at the rear wheel force is also distributed to 2 of the 6 pots of the front wheel. More modern dual CBS use front and rear calipers (and all pots) according to a preset load ratio of front to rear. The proportioning was originally controlled by complex all-hydraulic systems interlinking the front and rear, with a fixed delay or by sensing weight distribution changes. As early as 2001 an electrohydraulic system was introduced by BMW.

=== CBS and ABS ===
CBS helps to reduce the danger of wheel locks and fall downs but in certain situations, it is possible that CBS causes a fall down. If brake pressure is distributed from the rear wheel to the front wheel and the friction of the surfaces changes suddenly (puddle, ice on the street) the front wheel might lock even if only the rear brake has been applied. This would lead to a loss of stability and a fall down. CBS is therefore combined with ABS to avoid this on a motorcycle. Different approaches are possible to realize this combination: Without active pressure Build up Single Version: A third additional channel links the rear wheel circuit through a delay valve to the front brake. Strong brake pressure at the rear wheel (or both wheels) pressurizes both brake circuits however this pressure is adjusted according to wheel speed and brake slip.

The dual version combines Hondas Dual CBS with a secondary master cylinder and a proportional control valve [with Piston ABS] A modulator regulates the pressure for each With Active Pressure Build up In 2009, Honda introduced the electronic controlled combined ABS for its high-performance sports bikes which utilize brake by wire technology. The brake input of the rider is measured by pressure sensors and the information is provided to an ECU. Together with the information of the wheel speed sensors, the ECU calculates the optimal distribution of pressure to prevent lockups and to provide the best possible deceleration. Based on this output a motor for each wheel operates a pump that builds up and regulates the brake pressure on the wheel. This system offers a fast reaction time because of the brake by wire functionality.

The MIB (Motorcycle integral Braking system) from Continental Teves and the eCBS (electronic CBS) in the enhanced Motorcycle ABS from Bosch are results of another approach. These systems are based on the pump and valve approach. Through additional valves, stronger pumps and a more powerful motor the system can actively build up pressure. The input pressure of the rider is measured with pressure sensors at the lever and pedal. The pump then builds up additional pressure adjusted to riding conditions. A partial integral system is designed for working in one direction only: front→rear or rear→front. A fully integrated system works in both directions.

Because these systems are electronically controlled and are able to build up pressure actively, they offer the opportunity to adjust the motorcycle braking behavior to the rider. CBS and ABS can be switched off by experienced riders and also different regulation modes with higher and lower thresholds can be chosen, such as the rain or slick mode in the BMW S1000RR.

== Safety and legislation ==
=== Safety ===
The Insurance Institute for Highway Safety (IIHS) conducted a study on the effectiveness of ABS for motorcycles and came to the conclusion that motorcycles above 250 cm^{3} without ABS are 37 percent more likely to be involved in fatal crashes and a study of the Swedish Road Administration came to the conclusion that 48 percent of all severe and fatal motorcycle accidents above 125 cm^{3} could be avoided due to motorcycle ABS.

These studies caused the EU commission to initiate a legislative process in 2010 that was passed in 2012 and led to ABS for motorcycles above 125 cm^{3} becoming mandatory from 2016 onwards. Organizations like the Fédération Internationale de l'Automobile and the Institute of advanced Motorists (IAM) demanded the implementation of this legislation already for 2015. On the other hand, some motorcycle riders are protesting against a compulsory ABS for all bikes because they call for a possibility to switch the system off, for off-road usage or for other reasons. In 2011 the United Nations (UN) started the Decade of Action for Road Safety. The main goal is to save 5 million lives until 2020 through global cooperation. One part of their global plan is to: Encourage universal deployment of crash avoidance technologies with proven effectiveness such as Electronic Stability Control and Anti-Lock Braking Systems in motorcycles.

=== Laws and regulations ===
==== United States ====
In the United States, the NHTSA has mandated ABS in conjunction with electronic stability control under the provisions of FMVSS 126 as of September 1, 2012.

==== European and other international markets ====
ABS is required in all new passenger cars produced in the EU since 2003.

Since 2016, the EU has required ABS on all new scooters, motorcycles, tricycles, and quads over 125 cc, otherwise CBS (or ABS).

UN Regulation No. 78, related to the braking of vehicles of categories L1, L2, L3, L4 and L5 (motorbikes) is applied by the European Union, Russia, Japan, Turkey, Ukraine, Australia and the United Kingdom.

Global technical regulation number 3 related to Motorcycle brake systems is applied by Canada, the European Union, Japan, Russia, and the United States.

==== India ====
Since 1 April 2019, India has required at least single-channel ABS on all new two-wheelers from 125 cc, otherwise CBS (or ABS). ABS has also been mandatory on all new cars and mini-buses from the same date.

==== South American markets ====
Since 1 January 2019, Brazil has required ABS on all new motorcycles from 300 cc. ABS has been mandatory on all new cars since January 2014.

Since 1 January 2024, Argentina has required ABS on all new motorcycles from 250 cc, otherwise CBS (or front wheel ABS) for on-road between 50 and 250cc or their electric equivalents. ABS has been mandatory on all new normal cars since January 2014.

From February 2025, Chile will require ABS on all new motorcycles from 150 cc or 11 kW, otherwise CBS (or ABS) from 50 cc or 4 kW from February 2026. ABS has been mandatory on all new cars since October 2020.

From October 2025, Colombia will require ABS on all new motorcycles from 150 cc or 11 kW, otherwise CBS (or ABS) from 50 cc or 4 kW.

From March 2027, Colombia will require ABS on all new motorcycles from 125 cc, below that with CBS (or ABS).

== See also ==
- Left-foot braking
- Emergency brake assist, or brake assist system (BAS)
- Electronic stability control (ESP)
- Brake-by-wire (EBS)
