= Cadence braking =

Braking technique

Cadence braking or stutter braking is a driving technique that involves pumping the brake pedal and is used to allow a car to both steer and brake on a slippery surface. It is used to effect an emergency stop where traction is limited by reducing skidding due to road wheels locking up under braking. This can be a particular problem when different tires have different traction, such as on patchy ice. Its use in an emergency requires a presence of mind that the situation itself might preclude. Cadence braking is supposed to maximize the time for the driver to steer around the obstacle ahead, as it allows the driver to steer while slowing. It needs to be learned and practiced. For most drivers of modern cars, it has been made unnecessary by the anti-lock braking system (ABS); however it is still a valuable skill for drivers of non-ABS equipped vehicles such as classic cars.

Maximum braking force is obtained when there is approximately 10–20% slippage between the braked wheel's rotational speed and the road surface. Beyond this point, rolling grip diminishes rapidly and sliding friction provides a greater proportion of the force that slows the vehicle. Due to local heating and melting of the tires, the sliding friction can be very low. When braking at, or beyond, the peak braking force, steering is ineffective.

The anti-lock braking system performs cadence braking automatically, acting many times per second. The frequency is optimised to suit road conditions in the region where a vehicle is sold. ABS is used primarily to maintain as much steering control as possible. On wet, hard surfaces, this reduces total braking distance to some extent. On a vehicle with ABS pressing hard on the brake pedal forces ABS to activate, providing the best emergency stop and allowing some control over steering. Cadence braking (or any other type of braking) will not help much on extremely slippery surfaces such as ice (in theory it would, but in practice the ice can be so slippery that it makes little difference—a winter tire would make more difference). Also, on very loose surfaces, a quicker stop can be achieved by simply locking the wheels, causing a wedge of loose material to build up ahead of the wheels and create a substantial braking force. This is useful only when stopping in a straight line, because all steering control is lost if the wheels are locked. In such conditions, ABS actually increases the stopping distances. On poor surfaces, in the past, rally drivers timed the pulsing of brake application so as to take advantage of the load transfer as the vehicle pitches forwards and backwards in response to the initial braking effort. With modern, over-dampened, and stiffly sprung suspensions this is less likely to be effective.

While cadence braking is effective on most surfaces, it is less effective at slowing the vehicle than keeping the tires continually at the optimum braking point (threshold braking), an expert driving technique more difficult to learn than cadence braking, again largely made unnecessary by ABS. Threshold braking, or a good ABS, generally delivers the shortest straight-line stopping distance. ABS, cadence and interference braking are intended to preserve steering control while braking.
