= Threshold braking =

Braking Technique

Threshold braking or limit braking is a driving technique most commonly used in motor racing, and in road vehicles to slow a vehicle at the maximum rate using the brakes. The technique involves the driver controlling the brake pedal (or lever) pressure to maximize the braking force developed by the tires. The optimal amount of braking force is applied at the point when the wheel just begins to slip.

== Friction ==
Braking beyond the slipping point causes the tire to slide and reduces the frictional adhesion between the tire and driving surface. The aim of threshold braking is to keep the amount of tire slip at the optimal amount, the value that produces the maximum frictional, and thus braking, force. When wheels are slipping significantly (kinetic friction), the amount of friction available for braking is typically substantially less than when the wheels are not slipping (static friction), thereby reducing the braking force and eliminating steering ability. Peak friction occurs between the static and dynamic endpoints, and this is the point that threshold braking tries to maintain.

== Other factors ==
Because available friction at a given moment depends on many factors, including road surface material, temperature, tire rubber compound and wear, threshold braking is difficult to consistently achieve.

== See also ==
- Anti-lock braking system
- Cadence braking
- Circle of forces
