= Design speed =

Tool to determine features of a new road

The design speed is a tool used to determine geometric features of a new road or street during road design. Contrary to the word's implication, the design speed of the road or street is not necessarily its vehicle speed limit or maximum safe speed; that can be higher or lower.

Choosing a design speed means finding a balance between several interests which compete for priority, such as high vehicle speeds to allow drivers to travel to their destinations quickly versus low vehicle speeds for the safety of people outside the vehicle (such as pedestrians and cyclists), or quick movement of peak traffic (traffic engineering) versus maximising the economic development potential of the street (urban planning).

== Geometric features ==
The design speed chosen for a high-speed roadway is a major factor in choosing superelevation rates and radii of curves, sight distance, and the lengths of crest and sag vertical curves. Roads with higher design speeds require wider lanes, sweeping curves, wider recovery areas, broader clear zones, steeper curve banking, longer sight distances, and more gentle hill crests and valleys.

Roads and streets with lower design speeds require narrower lanes, sharper/tighter curves, smaller or no clear zones, less banking, less sight distance, and sharper hill crests and valleys.

== Speed limit variance from design speed ==
While a road's design speed is sometimes used to determine an initial speed limit, it is an imperfect measure of the maximum speed at which a motor vehicle can be operated for reasons including:

- It is only a theoretical or laboratory measurement created before a road is even built.
- Design speed is not necessarily road's maximum safe speed. As highway design incorporates a significant factor of safety, drivers can travel faster than design speed without difficulty when good weather conditions are present.
- The highest design speed for a road or segment is the design speed of its least favorable part. For example, given a road segment with a 60 miles per hour (97 km/h) design speed except for a curve with a 45 miles per hour (72 km/h) design speed, the entire segment would have a 45 miles per hour (72 km/h) design speed. The road may have a 45 miles per hour (72 km/h) advisory speed on the curve and higher safe operating speeds elsewhere.
- The design speed may be higher than legislated speed limit caps, so it would not be legal to sign some roads at their design speeds.
- It is based on the capabilities of vehicles and roadways that existed at or before the design speed was determined. Vehicular and roadway technologies generally improve over time. Therefore, as time elapses from when a roadway's original design speed was determined, it is increasingly likely that a design speed will underestimate the maximum safe speed.

Recognizing the limitations on the use of the design speed for speed limit determination, "operating speeds and even posted speed limits can be higher than design speeds without necessarily compromising safety" and "arbitrarily setting lower speed limits at point locations due to a lower inferred design speed is neither effective nor good engineering practice."

== Evolution ==
To be safe, the street must communicate the real level of risk to the driver. In other words, the driver must feel discomfort driving in a manner that is unsafe.

– Charles Marohn (2021)

The concept of design speed is evolving. The definition in the 1994 edition of the AASHTO Green Book, was "the maximum safe speed that can be maintained over a specified section of highway when conditions are so favorable that the design features of the highway govern. The assumed design speed should be a logical one with respect to the topography, the adjacent land use, and the functional classification of highway." Most US states used this definition. In 2004, the first sentence was changed to "a selected speed used to determine the various geometric design features of a roadway." This reflects the fact that meeting a minimum design speed is not enough to ensure a safe roadway.

Recently, the concept of design consistency has been used instead of minimum design speeds. This attempts to connect driver's expectations about the roadway with the roadway design. It uses driver behavior models to predict vehicle speeds on highway segments, and compares the predicted speed on adjacent segments. Significant reductions in speed from one segment to the next are flagged as locations where drivers may end up driving too fast for road conditions.

A major shift in philosophy is also taking place regarding design speed of urban and suburban streets. Highway engineers would measure the prevailing speed on a road, round up to the next multiple of 5 miles per hour (8.0 km/h), and design the road for that speed, assuming that it would be safe. Recent research and design practices have focused on using the street design to influence drivers to choose a speed appropriate for the neighborhood. This speed has been called the "target speed," and is ideally equal to the speed limit.

== Factors ==
When roads are planned, the selected design speed may be based on or influence several factors, including:

- geometric design of road features
- planned operating speed
- legislated speed limit caps
- anticipated traffic volume
- the road's functional classification

== See also ==
- Assured clear distance ahead
- Geometric design of roads
- Operating speed
- Solomon curve
- Speed limit
- Stopping sight distance
- Traffic calming

== Bibliography ==
- Marohn, Charles (2021). Confessions of a Recovering Engineer: Transportation for a Strong Town. Hoboken, New Jersey: John Wiley & Sons. p. 272. ISBN 9781119699255.
