= Operating speed =

Speed at which motor vehicles generally operate on a road

The operating speed of a road is the speed at which motor vehicles generally operate on that road.

The precise definition of "operating speed", however, is open to debate. Some sources, such as the AASHTO, have changed their definitions recently to match the common use of the word. In 1994, the AASHTO Green Book defined the operating speed as "the highest overall speed at which a driver can travel on a given highway under favorable weather conditions and under prevailing traffic conditions without at any time exceeding the safe speed as determined by the design speed on a section-by-section basis," a definition which a majority of US states still use. In July 2001, however, the AASHTO revised their definition for the new edition of the Green Book and defined it as "the speed at which drivers are observed operating their vehicles during free-flow conditions."

== See also ==
- Assured Clear Distance Ahead
- Design speed
- Solomon curve
- Speed limit
- Traffic psychology
