= Advisory speed limit =

Speed recommendation by a governing body

A U.S. advisory speed limit sign, warning drivers of a curve ahead

An advisory speed limit is a speed recommendation by a governing body, used when it may be non-obvious to the driver that the safe speed is below the legal speed. It is a posting which either approximates the Basic Speed Law or rule (and is subject to enforcement as such) or is based on a maximum g-force exerted at a specific speed. Advisory speed limits are often set in areas with many pedestrians, such as in city centres and outside schools, and on difficult stretches of roads, such as on tight corners or through roadworks. While travelling above the advisory speed limit is not illegal per se, it may be negligence per se and liability for any collisions that occur as a result of traveling above the limit can be placed partially or entirely on the person exceeding the advisory speed limit.

Signposting of advisory speed limits varies from country to country; Australia makes extensive use of advisory speed limits across its highway networks while the Richtgeschwindigkeit ("reference speed") in Germany is valid for the whole autobahn network (but can be overruled by speed limits in particular sections or for special reasons like weather conditions or roadworks), while the United States and the United Kingdom only give advisory speed limits for hazards such as bends.

== Use ==
Use of advisory speed limits varies by locale, but they are generally used to reduce speed along short stretches of dangerous road, such as on the tight curves of an off-ramp or on a busy shopping street. The advisory speed limit when not posted is generally the same as the mandatory speed limit in ideal conditions.

=== Australia ===
In Australia, if a person is involved in a single vehicle accident and the resulting investigation reveals that the driver was exceeding the Advisory Speed Limit displayed it can be a breach of the Insurance Cover Contract, resulting in no payout.

Advisory speeds in corners are set out in AS (Australian Standard) 1742.2-2009 Manual of Uniform Traffic Control Devices, Part 2, appendix F. Corners are signed to indicate a speed at which lateral g-forces will not exceed 0.22g to fall well within the minimum suggested static rollover threshold of 0.35g for non-dangerous goods.

=== Germany ===
Now abolished German signs (in km/h) indicating the beginning and end of an advisory speed limit

The Richtgeschwindigkeit (pronounced [ˈʁɪçtɡəˌʃvɪndɪçkaɪ̯t], lit. 'advisory or suggested speed of travel') is a legal term in Germany describing the advisory speed limit for roads without a mandatory speed limit. Autobahns have an advisory speed limit of 130 kilometres per hour (81 mph) on non-signposted sections.

Exceeding the advised speed is not a criminal offense, but may result in greater liability in the case of a collision due to an increased danger of operating the vehicle. There are multiple court cases where another car was recklessly cutting into the left lane but partial liability was assigned to the speeding driver nevertheless (Bundesgerichtshof, 17 March 1992, VI ZR 62/91: cut in without blinking, speeding at 150–180 km/h, 25% liability; OLG Koblenz, 14 October 2013, Az. 12 U 313/13: cut in from ramp directly across two lanes, speeding at 200 km/h, 40% liability)

In Germany, the Autobahn-Richtgeschwindigkeits-Verordnung (Directive on Reference Speed on Motorways), introduced in 1974, recommends a speed of no more than 130 km/h (81 mph) for autobahns and similar roads, whose lanes are separated by a median or which have at least two lanes per direction, provided there are no traffic signs posting a lower speed limit.

Until 31 August 2009, a different reference speed could be posted by the traffic signs number 380 and 381, according to §42 of the German traffic code (Straßenverkehrs-Ordnung, StVO), as seen above. As these traffic signs were only rarely used, they have been abolished, and were fully removed by 31 October 2022.

=== New Zealand ===
Advisory speeds are not legal speed limits. Advisory speeds end in 5 to avoid confusion with mandatory speed limits, which end in 0. The limits are established at 0.22g lateral g-force to fall well within the minimum static rollover threshold of 0.35g.

=== United Kingdom ===
In the United Kingdom, most speed limits imposed by variable-message signs are advisory, and there are no sanctions for drivers who exceed them; a notable exception being the Gatsometer-camera enforced, MIDAS and ATM variable limits on motorways such as the M25, M42 and M6. Crucially, the signs imposing these limits are distinct from regular, advisory VMS displays by the inclusion of a red ring surround, effectively changing them from advance hazard warnings into standard, mandatory speed-limit signs.

As local councils require consent from the Department for Transport before changing speed limits, some use advisory speed limits on roads that the DfT refuses to officially downgrade.

The usefulness of advisory speed limits has been questioned by a number of studies: one group from the Transportation Research Board found advisory speed limits through roadworks being consistently flouted by motorists, while an investigation by Manchester Evening News found that almost all buses in Manchester city centre exceeded the local 10 miles per hour (16 km/h) advisory speed limit; some by as much as 30 miles per hour (48 km/h).

== Signage ==
The signage for advisory speed limits is not defined by the Vienna Convention on Road Signs and Signals, and is therefore not standardised internationally. The United States uses a small yellow sign under the main warning sign, as well as a standalone variation on the standard speed limit sign, with a yellow background instead of a white one, the words "speed limit" omitted and an additional panel stating the type of hazard ahead. Though they list speeds, the United States advisory speed signs are classified as warning signs, not regulatory signs, as primary speed signs are. Australia uses a similar design as the United States in spite of regulatory speed limit signs being quite different. Germany used a square sign with a blue background and white lettering, similar to the minimum speed limit sign, and New Zealand uses a yellow background with black lettering (similar to the Australian design without the "km/h" lettering). Ireland and the United Kingdom currently use an oblong white rectangle, the latter with black lettering stating "Max Speed". In both countries it may not be used on its own – it must be used in conjunction with the appropriate warning sign.

Most of Europe

Australia

Australia (motorway exits)

Australia (with diagram of motorway exit shape)

Victoria, Australia (curve)

Western Australia, Australia (traffic-calming bumps, known as speed bumps)

Canada

Canada (Ontario) (highway ramps and exits)

Canada (British Columbia) (highway ramps and exits)

China (on motorways in areas prone to poor visibility)

Finland

Ireland

Japan

Netherlands

New Zealand

New Zealand (motorway exits)

New Zealand (dangerous curve)

New Zealand (extremely dangerous curve)

New Zealand (warning of danger of truck roll-over)

Norway

Philippines

Romania (variant)

South Korea

Sweden

United Kingdom (imperial)

United Kingdom (roadworks, imperial)

United States (customary)

United States (metric)

United States (highway exits)

United States (highway ramps)

United States (highway curves)

United States (warning of danger of truck roll-over)

United States (integrated into curve warning sign)
