= Stopping sight distance =

Type of sight distance in road design

Comparison of sight distances by type
Comparison of stopping sight to total braking distances
This plots the engineered worst case stopping scenario,
against baseline braking distance with good conditions.

Graphs of driver perception/reaction distance d_{PRT} (purple), braking distance d_{MT} (magenta) and stopping sight distance SSD (black) vs speed V for 2.5 s perception-reaction time and 3.4 m/s² (11.2 ft/s²) deceleration

Stopping sight distance is one of several types of sight distance used in road design. It is a near worst-case distance a vehicle driver needs to be able to see in order to have room to stop before colliding with something in the roadway, such as a pedestrian in a crosswalk, a stopped vehicle, or road debris. Insufficient sight distance can adversely affect the safety or operations of a roadway or intersection.

Stopping sight distance is the distance traveled during the two phases of stopping a vehicle: perception-reaction time (PRT), and maneuver time (MT). Perception-reaction time is the time it takes for a road user to realize that a reaction is needed due to a road condition, decide what maneuver is appropriate (in this case, stopping the vehicle), and start the maneuver (taking the foot off the accelerator and depressing the brake pedal). Maneuver time is the time it takes to complete the maneuver (decelerating and coming to a stop). The distance driven during perception-reaction time and maneuver time is the sight distance needed.

The design standards of the American Association of State Highway and Transportation Officials (AASHTO) allow 1.5 seconds for perception time and 1.0 second for reaction time.

The values of stopping sight distance used in design represent a near worst-case situation. For design, a conservative distance is needed to allow a vehicle traveling at design speed to stop before reaching a stationary object in its path. A generous amount of time is given for the perception-reaction process, and a fairly low rate of deceleration is used. The design sight distance allows a below-average driver to stop in time to avoid a collision in most cases.

Driver perception/reaction distance is calculated by:

d_{PRT} = 0.278 Vt (metric)
d_{PRT} = 1.47 Vt (US customary)

Where:

d_{PRT} = driver perception-reaction distance, m (ft)
V = design speed, km/h (mph)
t = brake reaction time, in seconds

Based on the results of many studies, 2.5 seconds has been chosen for a perception-reaction time. This time will accommodate approximately 90 percent of all drivers when confronted with simple to moderately complex highway situations. Greater reaction time should be allowed in situations that are more complex.

Braking distance is calculated by:

d_{MT} = (0.039 V^{2})/a (metric)
d_{MT}> = (1.075 V^{2})/a (US customary)

where:

d_{MT} = braking distance, m (ft)
V = design speed, km/h (mph)
a = deceleration rate, m/s^{2} (ft/s^{2})

Actual braking distances are affected by the vehicle type and condition, the incline of the road, the available traction, and numerous other factors.

A deceleration rate of 3.4 m/s^{2} (11.2 ft/s^{2}) is used to determine stopping sight distance. Approximately 90 percent of all drivers decelerate at rates greater than that. These values are within most drivers' ability to stay within his or her lane and maintain steering control. Also, most wet pavement surfaces and most vehicle braking systems are capable of providing enough braking force to exceed this deceleration rate.

Stopping sight distance (SSD) is the sum of reaction distance and braking distance

SSD = d_{PRT} + d_{MT}
SSD = 0.278 Vt + (0.039 V^{2})/a (metric)
SSD = 1.47 Vt + (1.075 V^{2})/a (US customary)

== See also ==
- Assured clear distance ahead
- Braking distance
- Design speed
- Reaction time
- Road traffic safety
- Traffic psychology
