= Roadway departure =

Type of single-vehicle collision

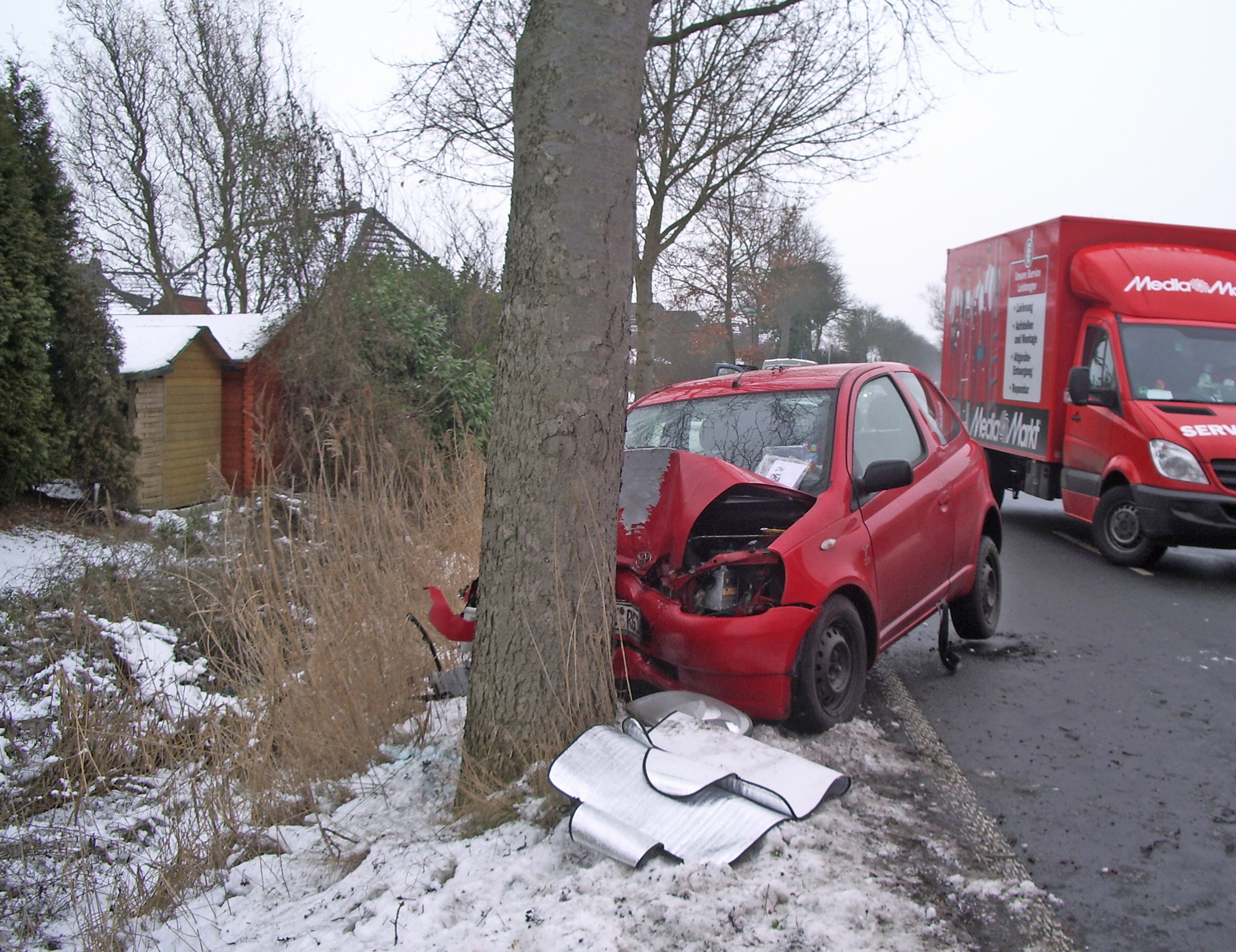
A run-off-road collision with a tree in Pinneberg, Germany in 2010

A roadway departure (also called roadway excursion or run-off-road collision) is a type of incident that occurs when a vehicle leaves the roadway. Such incidents can lead to a single-vehicle collision.

== Causes and consequences ==
Contributing factors can include:

- loss of control due to excessive or inappropriate speed
- distraction
- misjudging a curve
- attempting to avoid colliding with another road user or an animal.

If the vehicle strikes a fixed object (an object that will move very little when struck, such as a tree, bridge structure or utility pole) or rolls over, the crash is likely to result in injuries or fatalities. US statistics for 2005 show that roadway departure crashes resulted in 31% of fatal crashes, but were only 16% of all crashes. Roadway departure collisions where the vehicle is sliding or spinning and runs broadside into a fixed obstacle are particularly dangerous since the vehicle doors and sides provide less protection to occupants than the front of the car.

Target fixation is an issue for drivers, causing them to impact with objects that could be easily avoided.

== Clear zones ==
An important concept in understanding roadway departure is the clear zone. This is the roadside area that is free of obstacles and dangerous slopes. Early research at the General Motors Proving Grounds found that 80% of their test drivers stopped or regained vehicle control within 30 feet (9 m) of the edge of the travel lane. As a result, civil engineers began to try to provide thirty feet of clear, flat ground next to rural highways. The result was fewer crashes. Current guidance adjusts the desired clear zone width for curvature, roadside slope, speed and volume. More width is recommended on the outsides of curves, where the ground slopes down away from the road, and on high-speed, high-volume roads.

== Prevention and mitigation ==
There are several ways to reduce the consequences of roadway departure collisions. They fall into three main categories: preventing excursion incidents, minimizing the likelihood of a crash or roll-over if the vehicle travels off the shoulder, and reducing the severity of those that do occur.

=== Roadway cross section improvements ===
Roadway cross section improvements include high-friction overlays, improving curve banking, and widening shoulders or travel lanes. The intention is to help the driver to keep the car on the roadway. They are usually expensive unless included in a highway reconstruction project.

A relatively inexpensive countermeasure is the placement of a Safety Edge—a 30° compacted taper on the edge of the pavement. This helps any driver that runs off the edge of the roadway to maintain control while trying to steer back onto the pavement. A vertical edge drop-off often results in overcorrection, leading to a head-on collision, rollover, or a run-off-road collision on the far side of the road. Pavement edge drop-offs are problematic on roads where the hard shoulder is narrow or nonexistent. The safety edge adds about 1% to the pavement costs while building or resurfacing a road.

=== Hazard removal or modification ===
If possible, hazards should be removed, or modified to be less dangerous. Examples include tree removal, using forgiving road infrastructure or extending cross culverts out of the clear zone. Regarding forgiving road infrastructure: standards exist in different countries to crash test road infrastructure and to qualify them as being passive safe or forgiving. The US has MASH (the Manual for Assessing Safety Hardware) and Europe has EN12767. Removing obstacles should be the first choice. If that is not possible, they should be made forgiving. The last option is to isolate the obstacle with a guard rail.

Guard rails are used to reduce the severity of roadway departure crashes by interposing a barrier that is more forgiving to vehicle occupants. The guard rail is itself a hazard and should only be used where it shields traffic from a hazard that is more dangerous than it is. It may not reduce the number of run-off-road crashes since it is longer and closer to the road than the hazard behind it. Properly designed and installed, it will reduce the severity of crashes that do occur. One study found that installing a guard rail above an embankment would only reduce run-off-road crashes by only 7%. However, injury and fatal crashes were reduced by 45%.

=== Delineation ===
Where hazard removal and guard rails reduce the severity of roadway departure crashes, delineation aims to reduce the frequency of crashes by helping drivers stay on the road. It includes pavement markings, object markers, curve warning signs, delineators, and arrows and chevrons on curves. It is used where other improvements would be too costly or ineffective, as an interim method until other improvements can be installed, and to help drivers avoid collisions with a guard rail. Signing improvements will generally reduce crashes by about 30%. Because of its low cost, delineation is often the measure of choice on lower volume roads.

Some of these measures can also reduce the frequency and severity of head-on collisions. Median barriers are a form of guard rail that turn head-on crashes into fixed object crashes. Curve delineation and cross-section improvements can reduce loss-of-control incidents.

== Cost-effectiveness ==
Since most roadway improvements are funded by taxes or user fees, it is important that safety improvements pay for themselves. On low-speed, low-volume local roads, expensive improvements are likely to produce less in savings than they cost, and thus divert scarce resources from locations where they could be better used. On high-speed, high-volume freeways, high-quality clear zones are worth the cost.

== See also ==
- Bus plunge story
- Crash testing
- Road collision types
- Road traffic safety
