= Functional classification =

Class or group of roads to which a road belongs

The functional classification of a road is the class or group of roads to which the road belongs. There are three main functional classes as defined by the United States Federal Highway Administration: arterial, collector, and local.

== Arterial roads ==
Arterial roads generally provide the fastest method of travel and typically have low accessibility from neighboring roads. They are usually designed with long-distance travel in mind and are not as common as the other two functional classes of roads. Examples include interstates and highways.

== Collector roads ==
Collector roads are the second most common and are used as a connection between local roads and arterial roads. They provide a balance between access and mobility.

== Local roads ==
Local roads are the most common roads by far, but are also the slowest for travel. They are designed specifically to have high accessibility and to connect to collector and arterial roads, and are typically not used for through traffic. The main function of local roads are to allow for people who live in low density residential to connect to other residential areas or to collector roads.

== See also ==
- Road hierarchy
- Street hierarchy
