= Solomon curve =

Graphical representation of the collision rate of automobiles

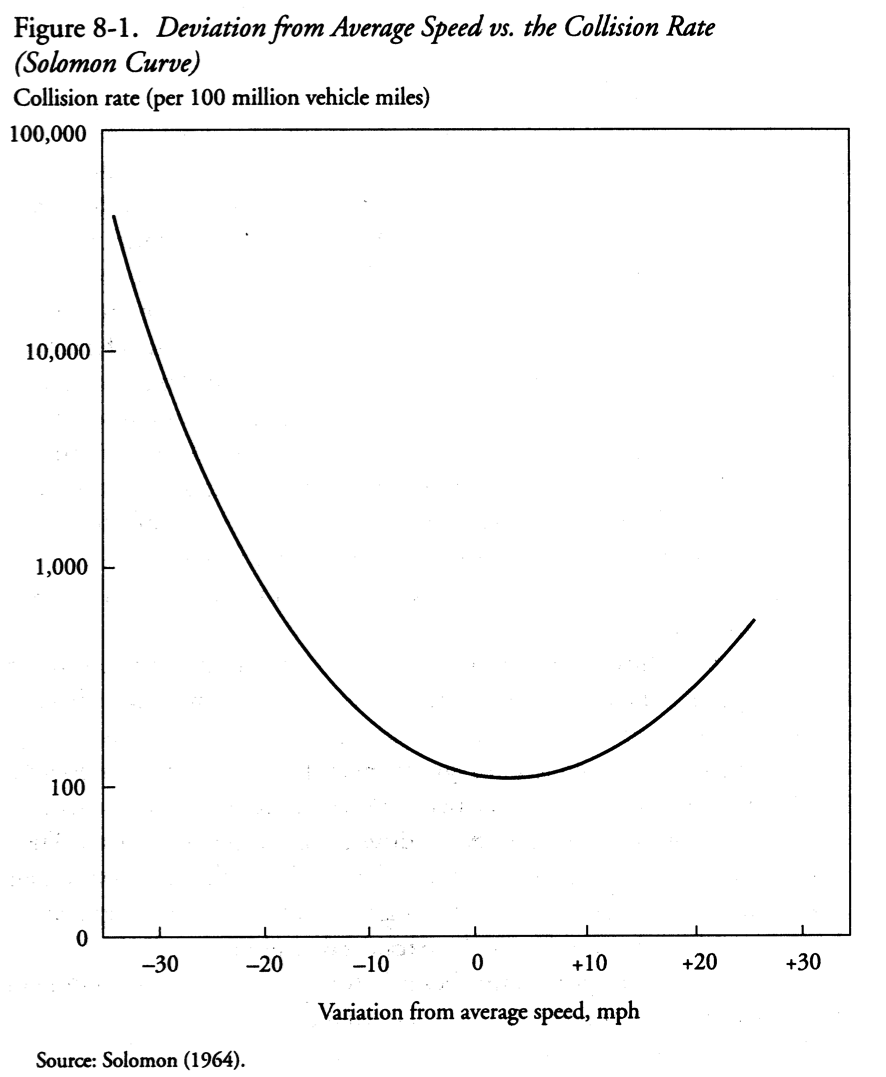
The Solomon curve as published in "Accidents on main rural highways related to speed, driver, and vehicle"

The Solomon curve is a graphical representation of the collision rate of automobiles as a function of their speed compared to the average vehicle speed on the same road. The curve was based on research conducted by David Solomon in the late 1950s and published in 1964. Subsequent research suggests significant biases in the Solomon study, which may cast doubt on its findings.

== Initial research ==
In 1964, Solomon researched the relationship between average speed and the collision rates of automobiles. While others have attempted to quantify the relationship between average speed and collision rates, Solomon's work was both "the earliest and best known". Solomon conducted a comprehensive study of more than 10,000 collision-involved drivers and their vehicles and how other roadway, driver, and vehicle characteristics affect the probability of being involved in a crash. He found that the probability of being involved in a crash per vehicle-mile as a function of on-road vehicle speeds follows a U-shaped curve with speed values around the median speed having the lowest probability of being in a crash. Although typically called the Solomon curve, the U-shaped curve has also been referred to as the Crash Risk Curve.

== Subsequent research ==
In 1968, Julie Cirillo conducted a similar study of 2,000 vehicles on interstate highways that examined the impact of speed variation on crashes involving two or more vehicles. The Cirillo data produced a U-shaped curve similar to the Solomon curve. The Research Triangle Institute conducted a study in 1970 where data was collected on 114 crashes involving 216 vehicles on a state highway in Indiana to address these concerns by (1) combining automated, embedded speed-monitoring stations with trained on-scene crash investigators, and (2) distinguishing data on vehicles slowing to negotiate a turn from vehicles moving slowly in the flow of traffic. Reporting on these results in 1971, academics West and Dunn confirmed the findings of Solomon and Cirillo, but found that crashes involving turning vehicles accounted for 44 percent of all crashes observed in the study and that excluding these crashes from the analysis greatly attenuated the factors that created the U-shape of the Solomon curve.

In 1991, Fildes, Rumbold, and Leening collected self-reported crash data from 707 motorists in Australia, with fewer than 200 reporting that they had been in a collision, but Solomon and Cirillo, the researchers, found no relationship between slower speeds and increased crash involvement. Notwithstanding the many studies over the years, in testimony before the Ohio Senate Highways and Transportation Committee on June 10, 2003, Julie Cirillo, Former Assistant Administrator and Chief Safety Officer for the Federal Motor Carrier Safety Administration (FMCSA), testified that "up to the present time there has been no evidence to alter Solomon’s original finding that variance from the mean operating speed is a major contributor to accidents".

In July 2001, Kloeden CN, Ponte G, and McLean AJ of the Road Accident Research Unit, Adelaide University quantified the relationship, "... between free traveling speed and the risk of involvement in a casualty crash in 80 km/h or greater speed limit zones in rural South Australia" using a case control study design. They found, "..the risk of involvement in a casualty crash increased more than exponentially with increasing free traveling speed above the mean traffic speed and that traveling speeds below the mean traffic speed were associated with a lower risk of being involved in a casualty crash." Outlining past research in this area, they suggest that, in the Solomon research, "Both the numerator (number of crashes in a particular speed band) and the denominator (number of vehicle-miles travelled in that same speed band) may have been quite inaccurate for relatively low speeds."

== Theoretical foundation ==
Hauer provided a theoretical foundation for the Solomon curve in 1971—"for example, if I drive at 45 mph, while the median of the pack is 60 mph, how many cars will pass me in an hour and hence have a chance to collide with me?"—that showed that the theoretical distribution was nearly identical to the Solomon curve.

== Practical implications ==
While Solomon’s research focused on speed deviation rather than speed, some commentators have cited it to support the conclusion that raw speed and crash risk are not directly related. On the other hand, while recognizing Solomon's research reveals the importance to safety of variability around average speed, Leonard Evans concludes in Traffic Safety and the Driver that control of absolute driver speed, and not variability, should be the primary focus of traffic safety regulation. Both views support the fact that the seminal research underlying the Solomon curve shows that the greater the difference between a driver’s speed and the average speed of traffic—both above and below that average speed—the greater the likelihood of involvement in a crash. Consequently, many states and safety organizations advise drivers to “drive with the flow of traffic”.

== See also ==
- Assured clear distance ahead
- Automotive safety
- Road safety
- Traffic collision
- Traffic engineering (transportation)
- Traffic psychology
