= Following distance =

Space between vehicles in traffic

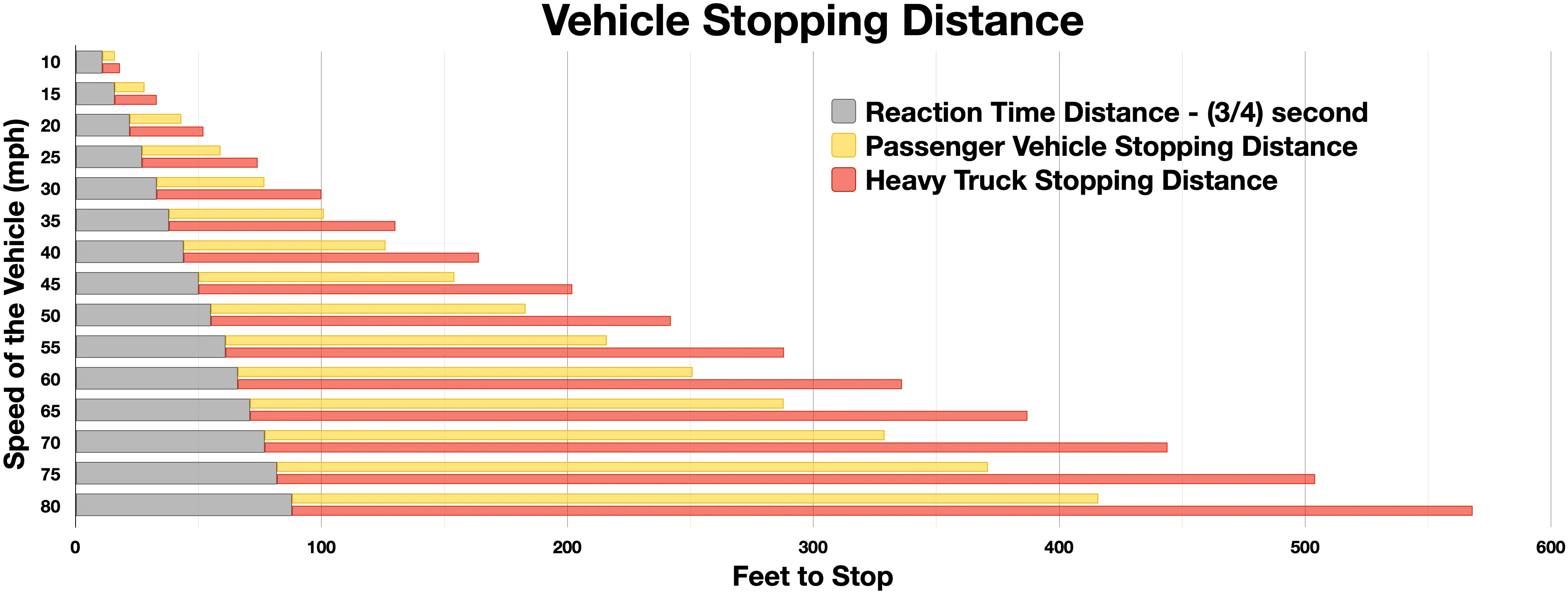
Vehicle Stopping Distance Reaction Time Distance - (3/4) second Passenger vehicle Stopping Distance Heavy Truck Stopping Distance

Following distance is the space between the back of a vehicle and the front of the following vehicle in traffic.

== National recommendations ==
=== Australia ===
In the Australian state of New South Wales, 3 seconds of following distance is recommended. In Queensland, Victoria, and Western Australia, 2 seconds is recommended.

=== Europe ===
In the European Union, the two-second rule is recommended, and in some European countries there are penalties for maintaining lower distances.

In the European Union, the term "failing to keep a safe distance from the vehicle in front" is used in the Directive (EU) 2015/413 of the European Parliament and of the Council of 11 March 2015 facilitating cross-border exchange of information on road-safety-related traffic offences. In this directive "failing to keep a safe distance from the vehicle in front" means not maintaining sufficient distance from the vehicle in front, as defined in the law of the Member State of the offence.

=== United Kingdom ===
In the UK, it is recommended that 2 seconds of following distance is maintained.

=== United States ===
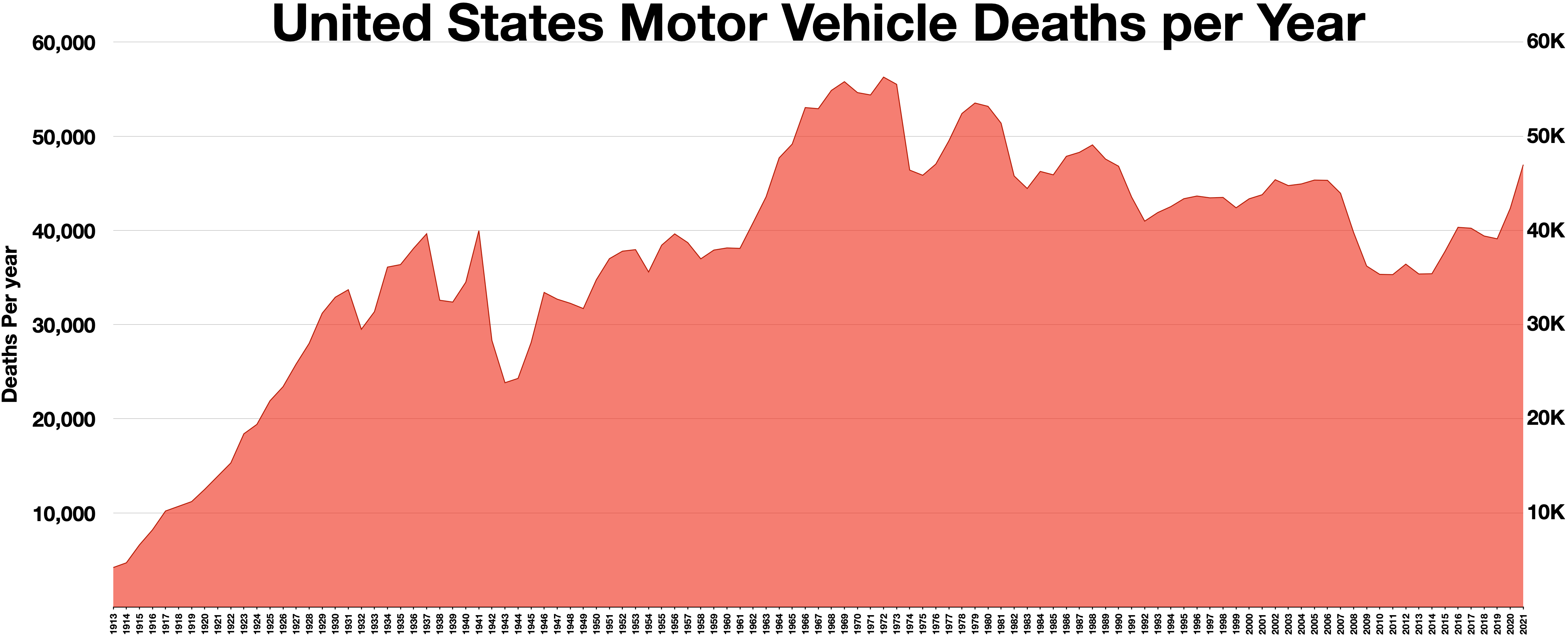
United States motor vehicle deaths per year

In the US, for safety it is recommended that 3-4 seconds of following distance is maintained. Extra time should be added for wet, rainy, slippery, foggy or other weather situations accordingly. For heavy duty commercial vehicles it is recommended 4-6 seconds following distance for speeds under 30 mi/h (48 km/h), and 6-8 seconds following distance for speeds over 30 mi/h (48 km/h). Rear-end collisions are the number one type of traffic collisions.

== See also ==
- Assured clear distance ahead
- Braking distance
- Hydroplaning
- Headway
- Road collision types
- Tailgating
- Two-second rule
