= Braking distance =

Physics concept relating to automobiles

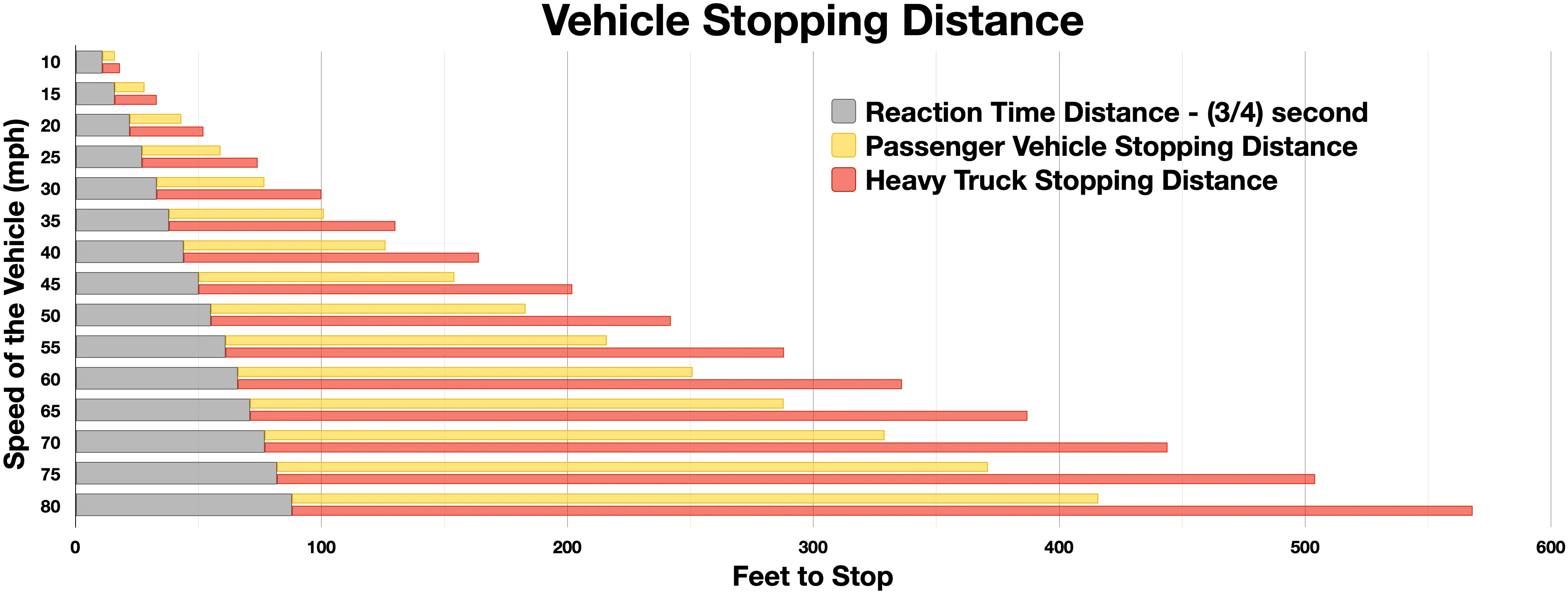
Vehicle Stopping Distance Reaction Time Distance - (3/4) second Passenger vehicle Stopping Distance Heavy Truck Stopping Distance

Braking distance refers to the distance a vehicle will travel from the point when its brakes are fully applied to when it comes to a complete stop. It is primarily affected by the original speed of the vehicle and the coefficient of friction between the tires and the road surface, (Note: The average friction coefficient (µ) is related to the tire's Treadwear rating by the following formula: $\mu =\frac{2.25}{TW^{0.15}}$ See HPwizard on Tire Friction) and negligibly by the tires' rolling resistance and vehicle's air drag. The type of brake system in use only affects trucks and large mass vehicles, which cannot supply enough force to match the static frictional force. (Note: The coefficient of friction is the ratio of the force necessary to move one body horizontally over another at a constant speed to the weight of the body. For a 10 ton truck, the force necessary to lock the brakes could be 7 tons, which is enough force to destroy the brake mechanism itself. While some brake types on lightweight vehicles are more prone to brake fade after extended use, or recover more quickly after water immersion, all should be capable of wheel lock.)

The braking distance is one of two principal components of the total stopping distance. The other component is the reaction distance, which is the product of the speed and the perception-reaction time of the driver/rider. A perception-reaction time of 1.5 seconds, and a coefficient of kinetic friction of 0.7 are standard for the purpose of determining a bare baseline for accident reconstruction and judicial notice; most people can stop slightly sooner under ideal conditions.

Braking distance is not to be confused with stopping sight distance. The latter is a road alignment visibility standard that provides motorists driving at or below the design speed an assured clear distance ahead (ACDA) which exceeds a safety factor distance that would be required by a slightly or nearly negligent driver to stop under a worst likely case scenario: typically slippery conditions (deceleration 0.35g (Note: THE 2001 GREEN BOOK revised braking distance portion of equation now based on deceleration ( a ) rather than friction factor ( f ) upon recommendation of NCHRP Report 400)) and a slow responding driver (2.5 seconds). Because the stopping sight distance far exceeds the actual stopping distance under most conditions, an otherwise capable driver who uses the full stopping sight distance, which results in injury, may be negligent for not stopping sooner.

== Derivation ==
=== Energy equation ===
The theoretical braking distance can be found by determining the work required to dissipate the vehicle's kinetic energy.

The kinetic energy E is given by the formula:

$$E=\frac{1}{2}mv^{2}$$,

where m is the vehicle's mass and v is the speed at the start of braking.

The work W done by braking is given by:

$$W=\mu mgd$$,

where μ is the coefficient of friction between the road surface and the tires, g is the gravity of Earth, and d is the distance travelled.

The braking distance (which is commonly measured as the skid length) given an initial driving speed v is then found by putting W = E, from which it follows that

$$d=\frac{v^{2}}{2\mu g}$$.

The maximum speed given an available braking distance d is given by:

$$v=\sqrt{2\mu gd}$$.

== Newton's law and equation of motion ==
From Newton's second law:

$$F=ma$$

For a level surface, the frictional force resulting from coefficient of friction $\mu$ is:

$$F_\text{frict}=-\mu mg$$

Equating the two yields the deceleration:

$$a=-\mu g$$

The $d_f(d_i,v_i,v_f)$ form of the formulas for constant acceleration is:

$$d_f=d_i + \frac{v_f^2-v_i^2}{2a}$$

Setting $d_i, v_f =0$ and then substituting $a$ into the equation yields the braking distance:

$$d_f=\frac{-v_i^2}{2a}=\frac{v_i^2}{2 \mu g}$$

== Total stopping distance ==
Total Stopping Distance [feet] by Vehicle Speed [mph]. View chart definition.
Tables of speed and stopping distances
Permitted by good tires and clean, dry, level, pavement.

The total stopping distance is the sum of the perception-reaction distance and the braking distance.

$$D_\text{total}=D_\text{p-r}+D_\text{braking}=v t_\text{p-r}+ \frac{v^2}{2 \mu g}$$

A common baseline value of $t_\text{p-r}=1.5 s, \mu=0.7$ is used in stopping distance charts. These values incorporate the ability of the vast majority of drivers under normal road conditions. However, a keen and alert driver may have perception-reaction times well below 1 second, and a modern car with computerized anti-skid brakes may have a friction coefficient of 0.9--or even far exceed 1.0 with sticky tires.

Experts historically used a reaction time of 0.75 seconds, but now incorporate perception resulting in an average perception-reaction time of: 1 second for population as an average; occasionally a two-second rule to simulate the elderly or neophyte; (Note: A study conducted by the Transportation Research Board in 1998 found that most people can perceive and react to an unexpected roadway condition in 2 seconds or less.) or even a 2.5 second reaction time—to specifically accommodate very elderly, debilitated, intoxicated, or distracted drivers. The coefficient of friction may be 0.25 or lower on wet or frozen asphalt, and anti-skid brakes and season specific performance tires may somewhat compensate for driver error and conditions. (Note: As speed increases, the braking distance is initially far less than the perception-reaction distance, but later it equals then rapidly exceeds it after 30 MPH for 1 second p-t times (46 MPH for 1.5s p-t times): $D_\text{p-r}=D_\text{braking}$ thus $vt_\text{p-r}=\frac{v^2}{2 \mu g}$. Solving for v, $v=2 \mu g t_\text{p-r}$. This is due to the quadratic nature of the kinetic energy increase versus the linear effect of a constant p-r time.) In legal contexts, conservative values suggestive of greater minimum stopping distances are often used as to be sure to exceed the pertinent legal burden of proof, with care not to go as far as to condone negligence. Thus, the reaction time chosen can be related to the burden's corresponding population percentile; generally a reaction time of 1 second is as a preponderance more probable than not, 1.5 seconds is clear and convincing, and 2.5 seconds is beyond reasonable doubt. The same principle applies to the friction coefficient values.

=== Actual total stopping distance ===
The actual total stopping distance may differ from the baseline value when the road or tire conditions are substantially different from the baseline conditions, or when the driver's cognitive function is superior or deficient. To determine actual total stopping distance, one would typically empirically obtain the coefficient of friction between the tire material and the exact road spot under the same road conditions and temperature. They would also measure the person's perception and reaction times. A driver who has innate reflexes, and thus braking distances, that are far below the safety margins provided in the road design or expected by other users, may not be safe to drive. Most old roads were not engineered with the deficient driver in mind, and often used a defunct 3/4 second reaction time standard. There have been recent road standard changes to make modern roadways more accessible to an increasingly aging population of drivers.

For rubber tyres on cars, the coefficient of friction (μ) decreases as the mass of the car increases. Additionally, μ depends on whether the wheels are locked or rolling during the braking, and a few more parameters such as rubber temperature (increases during the braking) and speed.

=== Rules of thumb ===
In a non-metric country, the stopping distance in feet given a velocity in MPH can be approximated as follows:

1. take the first digit of the velocity, and square it. Add a zero to the result, then divide by 2.
2. add the previous result to twice the velocity.

Example: velocity = 50 MPH. stopping distance = 5² = 25, add a zero = 250, divide by 2 = 125, add 2 × 50 = 225 feet (the exact value can be calculated using the formula given below the diagram on the right).

In Germany the rule of thumb for the stopping distance in a city in good conditions is the 1-second rule, i.e. the distance covered in 1 second should at most be the distance to the vehicle ahead. At 50 km/h this corresponds to about 15 m. For higher speeds up to about 100 km/h outside built-up areas, a similarly defined 2-second rule applies, which for 100 km/h translates to about 50 m. For speeds on the order of 100 km/h there is also the more or less equivalent rule that the stopping distance be the speed divided by 2 k/h, referred to as halber tacho (half the speedometer) rule, e.g. for 100 km/h the stopping distance should be about 50 m. Additionally, German driving schools teach their pupils that the total stopping distance is typically:

$(\text{Speed}\div10)\times3+(\text{Speed}\div10)^2$

In the UK, the typical total stopping distances (thinking distance plus braking distance) used in The Highway Code are quoted in Rule 126 as:

- 20 mph: 40 feet (12 metres)
- 30 mph: 75 feet (23 metres)
- 40 mph: 118 feet (36 metres)
- 50 mph: 175 feet (53 metres)
- 60 mph: 240 feet (73 metres)
- 70 mph: 315 feet (96 metres)

== See also ==
- Assured clear distance ahead
- Brake
- Cadence braking
- Defensive driving
- Following distance
- Motor vehicle accident
- No fault
- Skid mark
- Stopping sight distance
- Threshold braking
- Traffic safety
- Vehicle metrics
- Vehicular accident reconstruction
