= Tailgating =

Unsafe driving practice when a driver follows another too closely

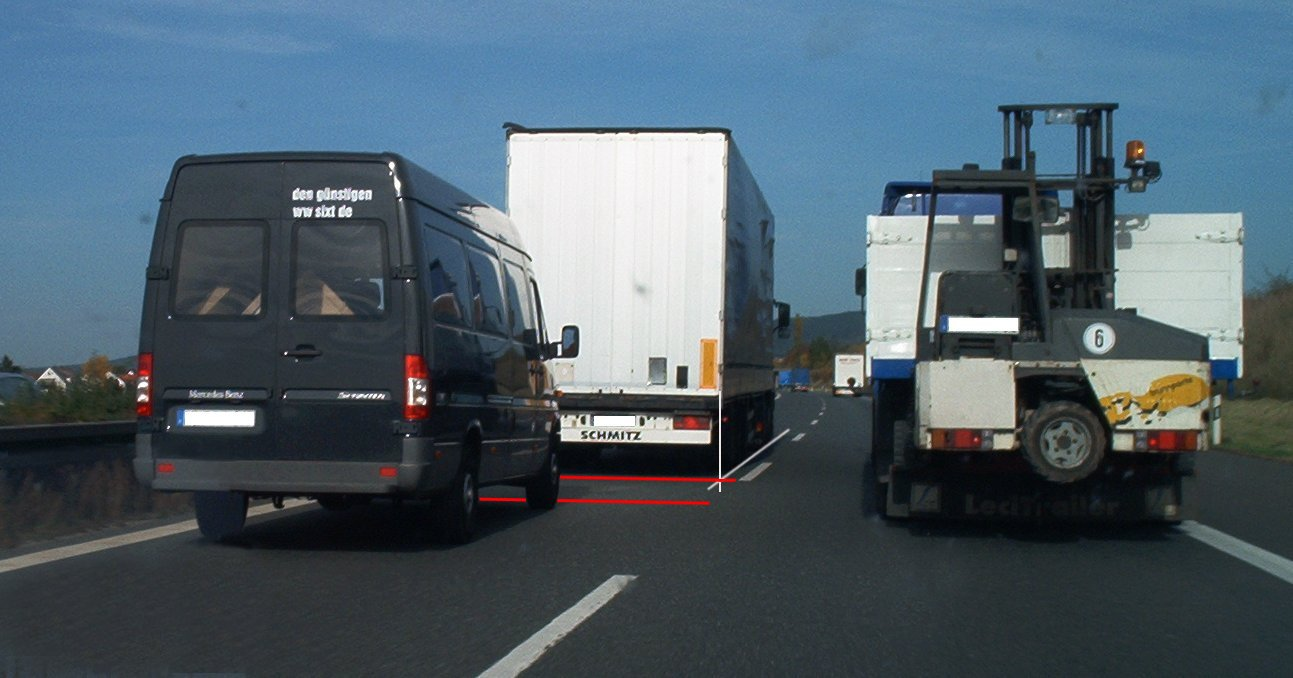
A typical example of tailgating. The truck is being followed very closely by a van.

Tailgating is the action of a driver driving behind another vehicle while not leaving sufficient distance to stop without causing a collision if the vehicle in front stops suddenly.

The safe distance for following another vehicle varies depending on various factors including vehicle speed, weather, visibility and other road conditions. Some jurisdictions may require a minimal gap of a specified distance or time interval. When following heavy vehicles or in less than ideal conditions (e.g. low light or rain), a longer distance is recommended, due to increased reaction times and stopping distances or because fatigue is most prevalent in long distance lorry driving.

== Causes ==
There can be several reasons for tailgating.

=== Preventing legal lane entry by other vehicles ===
Tailgating can occur when a vehicle attempts to prevent another vehicle on the right or left from entering the lane in front of them. The tailgating (or preventing) vehicle will drive as close as possible to another leading vehicle to prevent the side vehicle from such entry. Like all forms, this practice of tailgating is illegal and attempts to force the side vehicle to slow down and get into the line of traffic behind the tailgating vehicle. This practice may provoke road rage where one vehicle is blocking and another attempts to defy the block.

=== Negligence ===
Tailgating can occur because of a lack of perceived risk in so doing. Thus, it is done unconsciously or negligently, very often by people who consider themselves safe drivers and generally obey some other rules of the road. Evidence shows that more experienced drivers are more likely to be involved in rear-end collisions, possibly because they overestimate their skill and become complacent about allowing sufficient distance to avoid an accident.

=== Coercion ===
In its most uncivil form, it can be a case of road rage or intimidation. An example would be where the tailgating driver (the driver in the following vehicle) threatens damage to the leading vehicle and its occupants by driving aggressively – perhaps also with use of headlights and horn – to coerce the leading vehicle's driver into getting out of the way. The driver being tailgated might not wish to comply, especially if doing so would involve breaking the law, such as by increasing speed beyond the speed limit or changing lanes without due regard for safety.

=== Aerodynamics ===
A form of deliberate tailgating known as slipstreaming, "draft-assisted forced stop", or "draft-assisted forced auto stop" (D-FAS) is a technique used by some hypermilers to achieve greater fuel economy. D-FAS involves turning off the engine and gliding in neutral while tailgating a larger vehicle in order to take advantage of the reduced wind resistance in its immediate wake. Note that this practice is extremely dangerous: while tailgating itself is inherently risky, the danger of collision is increased with D-FAS as power for power brakes can be lost after a few applications of the brake pedal and, with older cars, the pressure that causes power steering to function can be lost as well.

=== Trailing and columns ===
Tailgating may occur when the drivers of two vehicles do not want to be separated, the vehicles are in a procession (e.g. funeral), or the vehicles are maintaining a formation for security purposes (e.g. escorting a dignitary or a dangerous prisoner). Another sphere wherein tailgating has been observed is among drivers who are in a hurry, or other public road activity whose prerequisite is urgency or agitation.

== Hazards of tailgating ==
Globally, each year over 500,000 motor-vehicle collisions and injuries have been attributed to not maintaining a safe following distance. In the United States, a 2015 NHTSA Traffic Safety Facts report documented over 1,000,000 rear-end collision crashes leading to injury or death. While not all rear-end collisions are caused by tailgating, research indicates that between 50% and 89% are either caused by or involve tailgating behaviour.

In Queensland, more than 7,000 injuries and fatalities were attributed to tailgating between 2019 and 2020. During the same period, 3,120 drivers received infringement notices for the behaviour.

== Prevention ==
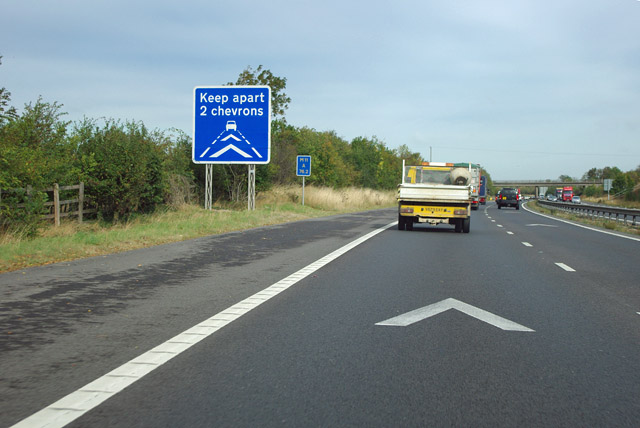
Anti-tailgating traffic sign and pavement markings in the United Kingdom

Tailgating causes most rear-end crashes in South Australia. Some motorways in the United Kingdom, Canada and Australia feature certain road markings which can help resolve this problem. Consisting of an arrangement of chevrons, these remind the driver not to tailgate, and assist in the two second rule, characterised in many countries by the slogan, "only a fool breaks the two-second rule." Public goods vehicle license training in Britain states that lorries should increase the 2 second gap to the vehicle in front to 3 seconds when being tailgated to ensure that emergency braking can be a little gentler, to compensate for the tailgating vehicle behind having eaten up its own reaction time to almost nothing.

Research has identified young males as the demographic most likely to engage in tailgating behaviour. A 2021 study examining deterrence-based theories found that the severity of punishment was a significant deterrent factor for this cohort when considering following other vehicles too closely.

In Queensland Australia, the maximum penalty for drivers who don't leave a safe distance between themselves and the driver in front is $3220.

In Germany, tailgating is punishable with a fine of up to €400. In case of gross negligence, one or more penalty points are given and the driver's license may additionally be immediately suspended for up to 3 months.

== See also ==
- Brake check
