= Rear-end collision =

Traffic-collision type

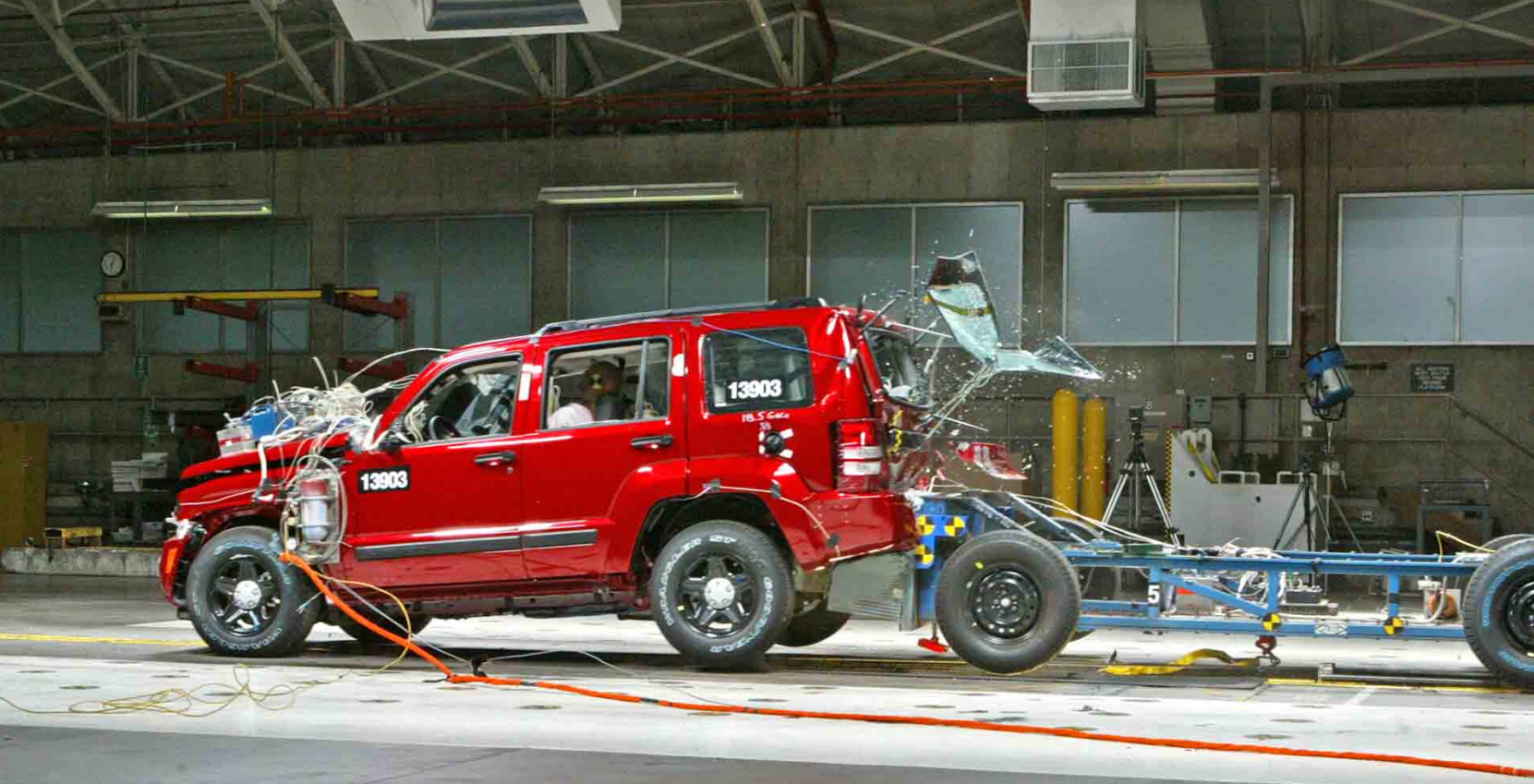
Jeep Liberty undergoing rear-end crash testing at Chrysler's Proving Grounds

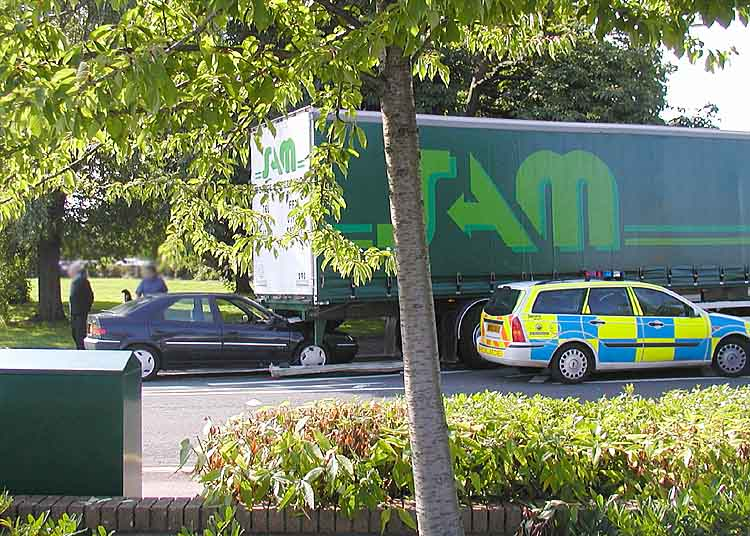
A rear-end collision in Yate, near Bristol, England, in July 2004. The car failed to stop when the semi truck stopped at a roundabout. The car's bonnet can be seen deep under the rear of the lorry.

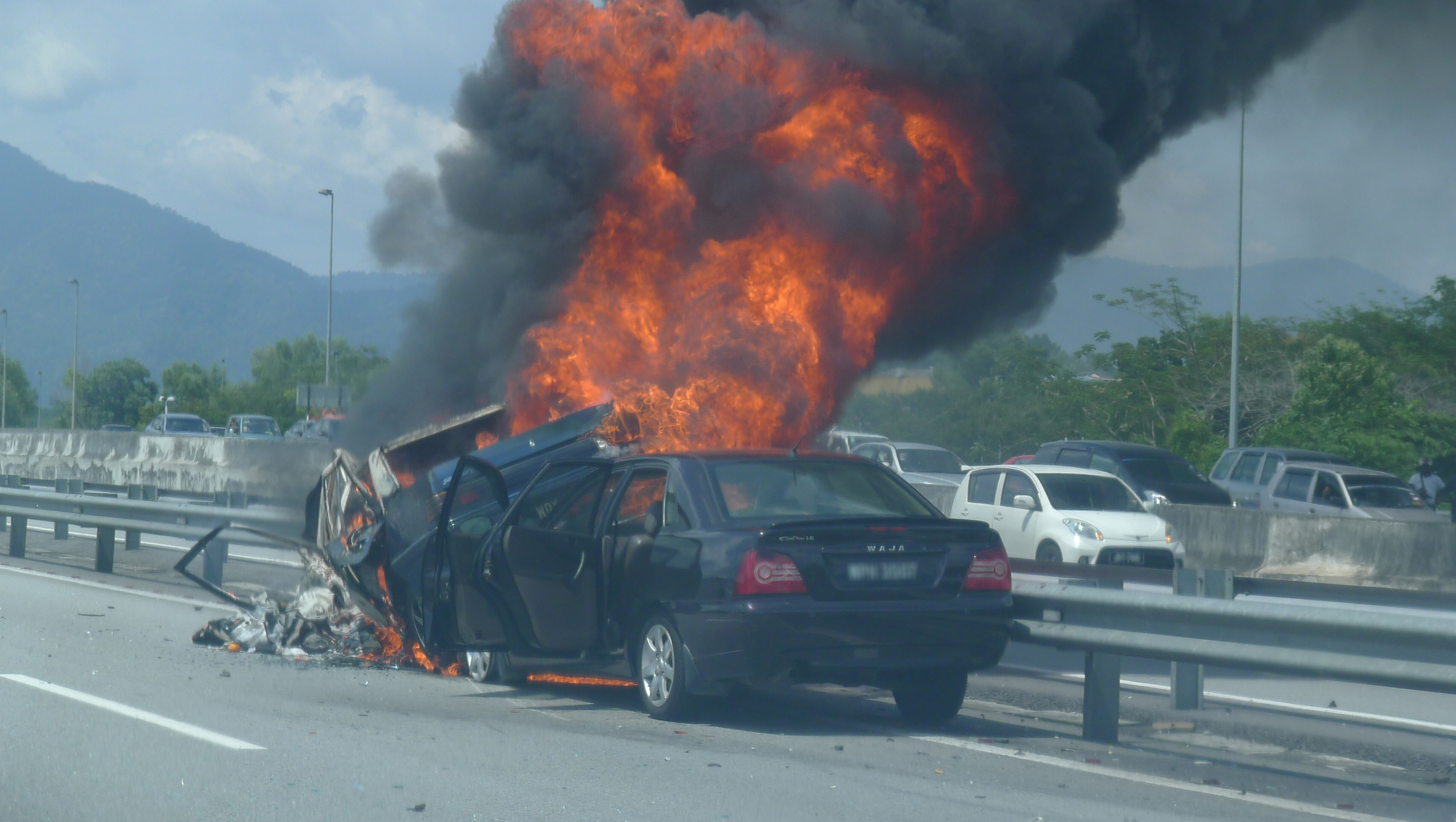
A severe rear-end collision that resulted in a burning wreckage along the North–South Expressway in Malaysia. All occupants escaped.

Video of rear-end collision between multiple cars on highway.

A rear-end collision, often called rear-ending or, in the UK, a shunt, occurs when a forward-moving vehicle crashes into the back of another vehicle (often stationary) in front of it. Similarly, rear-end rail collisions occur when a train runs into the end of a preceding train on the same track. Common factors contributing to rear-end collisions include driver inattention or distraction, tailgating, panic stops, brake checking and reduced traction due to wet weather or worn pavement.

According to the National Highway Safety Administration (NHTSA), rear-end collisions account for 7.5% of fatal automobile collisions. However, they account for 29% of all automobile accidents, making them one of the most frequent types of automobile accidents in the United States.

According to NHTSA in 2020, out of 419,400 people involved in rear-end crashes, less than 1% were killed and over 99% were injured.

== Overview ==
Typical scenarios for rear-ends are a sudden deceleration by the first car (for example, to avoid someone crossing the street) so that the driver behind it does not have time to brake and collides with it. Alternatively, the following car may accelerate more rapidly than the leading one (for example, leaving an intersection), resulting in a collision.

Generally, if two vehicles have similar physical structures, crashing into another car is equivalent to crashing into a rigid, immovable surface (like a wall) at half of the closing speed. This means that rear-ending a stationary car while travelling at 50 km/h (30 mph) is equivalent, in terms of deceleration, to crashing into a wall at 25 km/h (15 mph). The same is true for the vehicle crashed into. However, if one of the vehicles is significantly more rigid (e.g. a small car hits the rear of a heavy truck) then the deceleration is more typically reflected by the full closing speed for the less rigid vehicle.

A typical medical consequence of rear-ends, even in collisions at moderate speed, is whiplash. In more severe cases, permanent injuries such as herniation may occur. The rearmost passengers in minivans, benefiting little from the short rear crumple zone, are more likely to be injured or killed.

For purposes of insurance and policing, the driver of the car that rear-ends the other car is almost always considered at fault due to following too closely, or lack of attention. An exception is if the rear-ended vehicle is in reverse gear. If the driver of the car that was rear-ended files a claim against the driver who hit them, the second driver could be responsible for all damages to the other driver's car. According to data from the NHTSA, the percentage of rear-end accidents in all crashes is 23–30%.

The Ford Pinto received widespread concern when it was alleged that a design flaw could cause fuel-fed fires in rear-end collisions.

Recent developments in automated safety systems have reduced the number of rear-end collisions.

== See also ==
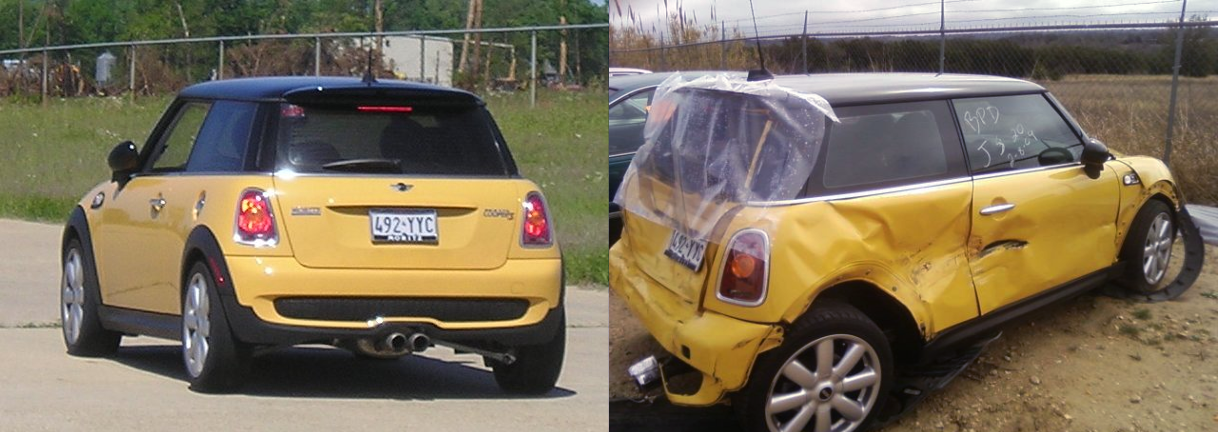
A MINI Cooper S before and after a rear end impact

- Following distance
- Road collision types
- Tailgating
