= Two-second rule =

Rule of thumb in driving

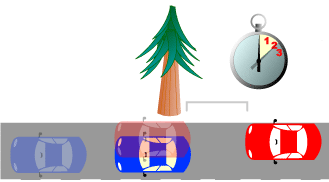
The three second rule is a time for the defensive driver to judge the minimum safe trailing distance to help avoid collisions under ideal driving conditions. The red car's driver picks a tree to judge a two-second safety buffer.

The two-second rule is a rule of thumb by which a driver may maintain a safe trailing distance at any speed. The rule is that a driver should ideally stay at least two seconds behind any vehicle that is directly in front of their vehicle. It is intended for automobiles, although its general principle applies to other types of vehicles. Some areas recommend a three-second rule instead of a two-second rule to give an additional buffer.

The rule is not a guide to safe stopping distance, it is more a guide to reaction times. The two-second rule tells a defensive driver the minimum distance needed to reduce the risk of collision under ideal driving conditions. The allotted two-seconds is a safety buffer, to allow the following driver time to respond. The practice has been shown to considerably reduce the risk of collision and also the severity of any injuries if a collision occurs. It also helps to avoid tailgating and road rage for all drivers.

A large risk of tailgating is the collision avoidance time being much less than the driver reaction time. Driving instructors advocate that drivers always use the "two-second rule" regardless of speed or the type of road. During adverse weather, downhill slopes, or hazardous conditions such as black ice, it is important to maintain an even greater distance.

== Application ==
The two-second rule is useful as it can be applied to any speed. Drivers can find it difficult to estimate the correct distance from the car in front, let alone remember the stopping distances that are required for a given speed, or to compute the equation on the fly. The two-second rule provides a simpler way of perceiving the distance.

To estimate the time, a driver can wait until the rear end of the vehicle in front passes any distinct and fixed point on the roadway—e.g. a road sign, mailbox, line/crack/patch in the road. After the car ahead passes a given fixed point, the front of one's car should pass the same point no less than two seconds later. If the elapsed time is less than this, one should increase the distance, then repeat the method again until the time is at least two seconds.

One can count the duration of time simply by saying "zero... one... two". Some instructors suggest that drivers say "only a fool breaks the two-second rule". At a normal speaking rate, this sentence takes approximately two seconds to say and serves as a reminder to the driver of the importance of the rule itself.

The TailGuardian distance advisory decals recently adopted by Stagecoach Buses in the UK use the two-second rule in their calibration. Advisory Decals for 30, 50 and 70 mph are calibrated to be invisible outside those safe distance, only rendering themselves visible once the car following has entered the safety zone for the speed that they are travelling.

== Three-second rules ==
Some authorities regard two seconds as inadequate, and recommend a three-second rule. German law requires a minimum 0.9 second distance but when tested under relaxed conditions researchers found that their test subjects spent 41% of the test time at following distances under 0.9 seconds.

The United States National Safety Council suggests that a three-second rule—with increases of one second per factor of driving difficulty—is more appropriate. Factors that make driving more difficult include poor lighting conditions (dawn and dusk are the most common); inclement weather (ice, rain, snow, fog, etc.), adverse traffic mix (heavy vehicles, slow vehicles, impaired drivers, pedestrians, bicyclists, etc.), and personal condition (fatigue, sleepiness, drug-related loss of response time, distracting thoughts, etc.). For example, a fatigued driver piloting a car in rainy weather at dusk would do well to observe a six-second following distance, rather than the basic three-second gap.

== See also ==
- Assured Clear Distance Ahead (ACDA)
- Braking distance
- Following distance
- Stopping sight distance
