= Vehicular metrics =

Metrics that denote the relative capabilities of various vehicles

There are a broad range of metrics that denote the relative capabilities of various vehicles. Most of them apply to all vehicles while others are type-specific.

Measurement	American unit	Imperial unit	Metric unit	Affects	General preference	Notes
0 to 100 km/h (0 to 60 mph)	seconds	seconds	seconds	acceleration	lower is better	
0 to 100 to 0 mph	seconds	seconds	seconds	acceleration and braking	lower is better	formerly common in British publications
Autonomy	miles	miles	kilometers	comfort, safety, economics, range	higher is better	Autonomous means self-governing. Many historical projects related to vehicle automation have been automated (made automatic) subject to a heavy reliance on artificial aids in their environment, such as magnetic strips. Autonomous control implies satisfactory performance under significant uncertainties in the environment, and the ability to compensate for system failures without external intervention.
Braking distance	feet	feet	meters	safety	shorter is better	
Brake specific fuel consumption	lb/(hp·h)	lb/(hp·h)	g/(kW·h)	economics, range	lower is better	
traveled Distance	miles	miles	kilometers	economy	higher rating is better for vehicle longevity; lower elapsed is better for vehicle resale	
Drag coefficient	(ratio)	(ratio)	(ratio)	economics, top speed, range	lower is better for moving into/through a fluid(air/water), higher is better for stopping/redirecting with a fluid	
Friction or Friction coefficient	lbf or (ratio)	lbf or (ratio)	N or (ratio)	acceleration, braking distance, traction, fuel consumption, tyre wear	lower is better on kinetic parts(drivetrain), higher is better on static parts[chassis binds/bolts/clamps/composites/nails/screws/welds, control surfaces(brake pad-to-disc and wheel-to-ground patchs)]	improved by lubricated drivetrain, dry and clean road surface/adhesion railway, reducing road slipperiness/skid (automobile)
Frontal cross-section area	sq ft	sq ft	m^{2}	economics, top speed, range, cargo capacity	lower is better	if area is too small, vehicle becomes difficult to use
Fuel economy	mpg (US)	mpg (imperial)	l/100 km and km/L	economics, range	greater is better (mpg and km/L), lower is better (L/100 km)	must be specified on new vehicles for sale in the US and UK
Maximum g-force(s)	g or ft/s^{2}	g or ft/s^{2}	g or m/s^{2}	acceleration, braking (safety)	higher is usually better	measures cornering, braking or forward acceleration
Ground pressure	psi	psi	pascals (sometimes bar)	traction	lower is better in soft ground, reduces bogging; higher with loose surface	has greater impact on off-road vehicles
Lift to drag ratio	(ratio)	(ratio)	(ratio)	economics, range	higher is better for airfoil/hydrofoil; lower is better for stopping/redirecting	improved by narrow, long wings
Noise/Vibration	dB	dB	dB	comfort, stress, health, awareness (safety), Insurance	lower is better	Noise from traffic, is considered by the World Health Organization to be one of the worst environmental stressors for humans, second only to air pollution. Elevated workplace or environmental noise can cause hearing impairment, tinnitus, hypertension, ischemic heart disease, annoyance, and sleep disturbance. Changes in the immune system and birth defects have been also attributed to noise exposure. Stress from time spent around elevated noise levels has been linked with increased workplace accident rates and aggression and other anti-social behaviors. The most significant sources are vehicles, aircraft, prolonged exposure to loud music, and industrial noise. There are approximately 10,000 deaths per year as a result of noise in the European Union. A loss in situational awareness has led to many transportation disasters, including the 2015 Philadelphia train derailment.
Power	hp	hp	kW	acceleration	higher is better	Refers to maximum power (high torque and speed). The rate at which torque is applied. Also the rate at which work is done. Power = Torque × RPM / 5252. Automobile manufacturers publish power measured at the crankshaft (bhp or brake horsepower). However, it is the power a car can produce at the wheels (wheel horsepower or whp) that matters when it comes to acceleration performance. Wheel horsepower equals brake horsepower minus drivetrain losses, which can be anywhere from about 10% to 25%.
Power-to-weight ratio	hp/lb	hp/lb	W/kg	acceleration	higher is better	
Propulsive efficiency	%	%	%	economics, range	higher is better	For rockets and aircraft, percent of the energy contained in a vehicle's propellant converted into useful energy
Rate of climb	feet/min	feet/min	meters/min	combat effectiveness, economics	higher is better	Applies to fighter aircraft who need to intercept or evade other fighters. In civilian aircraft this denotes how quickly they can reach optimal cruising altitude.
Roll center	inches	inches	mm	handling	Too many variables to state a general preference.	
Rolling resistance or Rolling resistance coefficient	lbf or (ratio)	lbf or (ratio)	N or (ratio)	economics, top speed, range, cargo capacity	lower is better	improved by narrow, high pressure tires with narrow, large radius, steel/titanium alloy wheels on steel/concrete. Best available examples are Railroad steel wheels on steel rails.
Second moment	psi (lb·sq ft)	psi (lb·sq ft)	kg·m^{2}	handling	lower permits quicker turn-in for cars, higher is more stable in straight line.	The moment of inertia about a vertical axis of a vehicle
Size	feet	feet	meters	handling, safety	lower is better for parking on narrow parking slots, higher is better for lateral Traffic collision	
Shift time	mSec	ms	ms	acceleration	lower is better	for vehicles equipped with automatic transmissions
Specific fuel consumption (thrust)	lb/(lbf·h)	lb/(lbf·h)	kg/(kgf·h) or g/(kN·s)	economics, range	lower is better (for any given speed)	in airbreathing jet engines it is improved by using more inert air for propulsion (i.e. lower exhaust velocity), in rockets, higher exhaust velocity
Specific fuel consumption (shaft engine)	lb/(hp·h)	lb/(hp·h)	kg/(kW·h)	economics, range	lower is better	for shaft engines less fuel use for a given output power means higher efficiency
specific impulse	seconds	seconds	seconds or kN·s/kg	economics, delta-v/range	higher is typically better	in airbreathing jet engines it is improved by using more inert air for propulsion (i.e. lower exhaust velocity), in rockets, higher exhaust velocity
Top speed	mph	mph	km/h	Maximum rate of straight line travel	higher is better	Electronically limited in some cars for safety (mostly due to concerns of tire failure at high speed) A speed greater than the legal maximum/recommended speed limit can be considered as useless/unsafe.
Torque	lbf·ft or lb·ft	lbf·ft or lb·ft	N·m	acceleration	higher is better	Refers to the overall maximum torque an engine can produce, or the maximum torque an engine can produce at a given RPM. 300 lbf·ft would be like applying 300 pounds of force to the end of 1 foot long wrench, or twisting a 2-inch diameter shaft with 3600 pounds of force!
Turning radius	feet	feet	meters	handling	lower is better	
Weight, mass or Dry weight	lb	lb, long tons, cwt	kg	acceleration, braking distance, traction, fuel consumption, road and tyre wear	lower is better for road and vehicle performance and taxation; larger is usually better for large goods vehicles carrying loads	
Weight distribution	%	%	%	handling, acceleration, traction	close to 50:50 (%Front:%Rear) is commonly considered better	
Gross axle weight rating	lb/axle	lb/axle	kg/axle	durability, economics	lower is better for road and vehicle performance and taxation; larger is usually better for large goods vehicles carrying loads	Ultimately limited by the hardness of the road surface and legal limits intended to limit damage to it

== See also ==
- Utility cycling – Bicycling as transportation
- Energy efficiency in transport – Discussing what form of transport is the most fuel efficient and economical
- Health and environmental effects of transport
- Traffic count – The number of vehicles passing an area
- Emission standard – Legal requirements governing air pollutants released into the atmosphere
- Walkability – How accessible a space is to walking
