= Brake check =

Dangerous driving manoeuvre

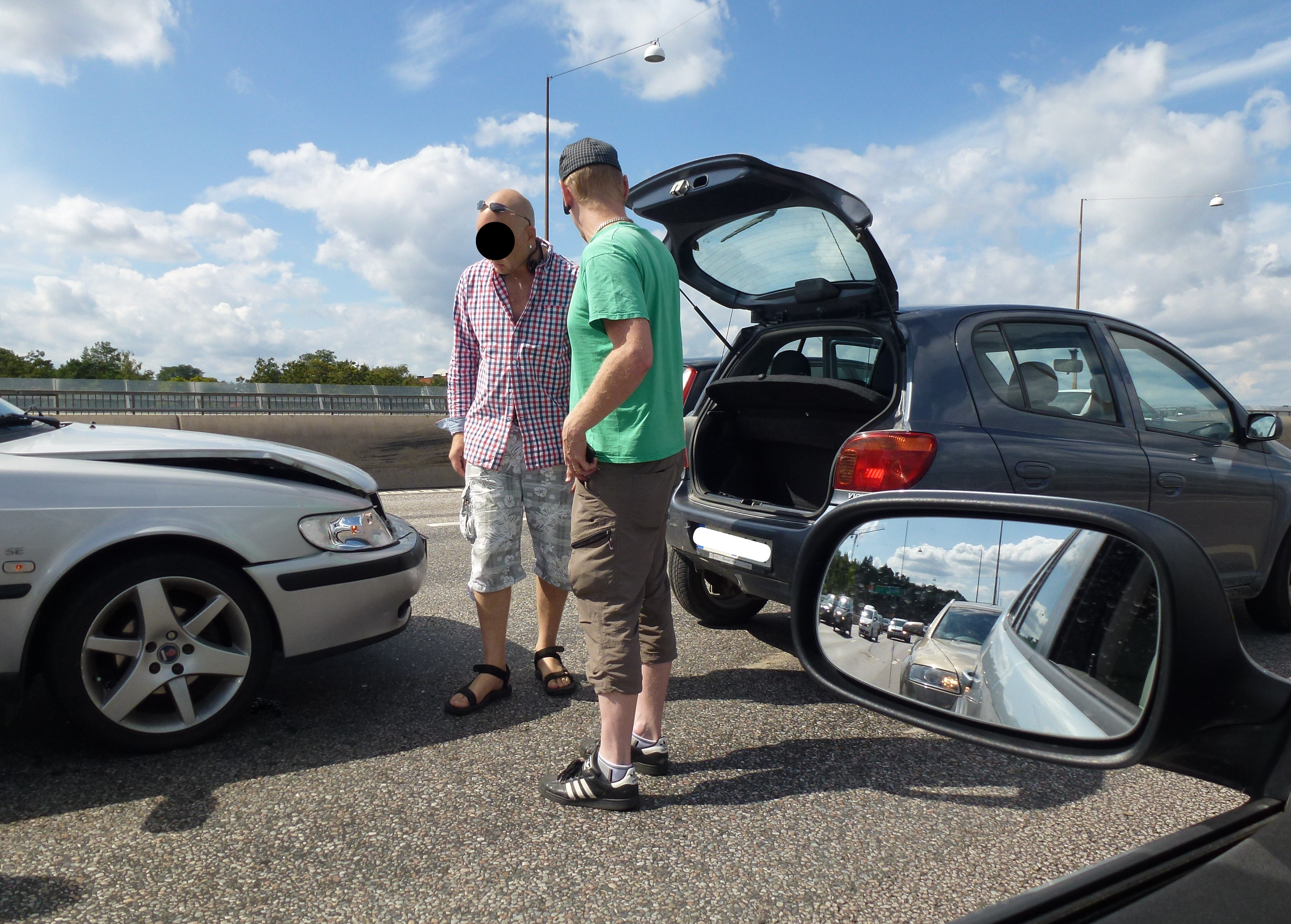
Rear-end collision is a possible outcome from brake checking.

A brake check, also known as a brake test, occurs when a driver deliberately either taps on the brakes several times or slams hard on the pedal when moving in front of another vehicle, with the intention of causing the behind driver to either collide or take evasive action. The term is often applied in the context of auto racing.

== Legality ==
=== United States ===
In most states, brake checking is considered a crime and falls under laws pertaining to reckless driving, aggressive driving, or stunt driving. Under Section 22109 of the California Vehicle Code, a driver cannot stop suddenly or decrease their speed on a highway without giving an appropriate signal to the drivers behind them. The Washington State Department of Licensing in the United States includes brake checking as a symptom of aggressive driving.

=== Canada ===
Legal experts in the Canadian Province of Ontario consider it to fall under that province's stunt driving laws.

== In motorsports ==
The concept of brake checking is often seen in auto racing, with several drivers being accused of, or admitting to, brake checking competitors for various reasons. At the 2006 Lenox Industrial Tools 300 at New Hampshire Motor Speedway, NASCAR driver Robby Gordon brake checked Michael Waltrip during a caution period in what was seen as retaliation for contact between them earlier in the race and for an incident that occurred between the two the year prior at the same track. The resulting collision caved in the nose and radiator of Waltrip's car, leaving him stranded in the middle of the backstretch with fluid leaking onto the track.

An incident in the 2017 Azerbaijan Grand Prix between Lewis Hamilton and Sebastian Vettel was attributed to Vettel's belief that he had been brake checked by Hamilton.

In 2018, an on-track incident between NASCAR drivers Kevin Harvick and Denny Hamlin at the spring Martinsville Speedway race ended in what Autoweek's Matt Weaver described as, "Harvick ... slamming on his brakes, the resulting contact severely damaging the nose on Hamlin's Toyota." Hamlin would later comment, "I probably should have brake-checked him in the first place."

In 2021, at the Saudi Arabian Grand Prix, Max Verstappen brake checked Lewis Hamilton after Verstappen was asked to give a place back for previously overtaking Hamilton off track. Red Bull Racing's chief technical officer Adrian Newey said "I think he got frustrated with Lewis not overtaking him but he still shouldn't have brake-tested him."

In the 2024 Australian Grand Prix, during the final lap of the race, Aston Martin's Fernando Alonso brake tested Mercedes' George Russell at Turn Six of the circuit, which caused Russell to close distance unusually fast. This culminated in Russell losing control of the car, causing him to crash, with the car coming to rest upside-down in the middle of the track. This saw the race ending under a virtual safety car. Alonso received a 20 second penalty for erratic driving. Russell would later comment: "It caught me by surprise. I was half a second behind him and next thing he slams on the brakes, accelerates again and then slams on the brakes again."
