= Roll center =

Point in vehicle dynamics

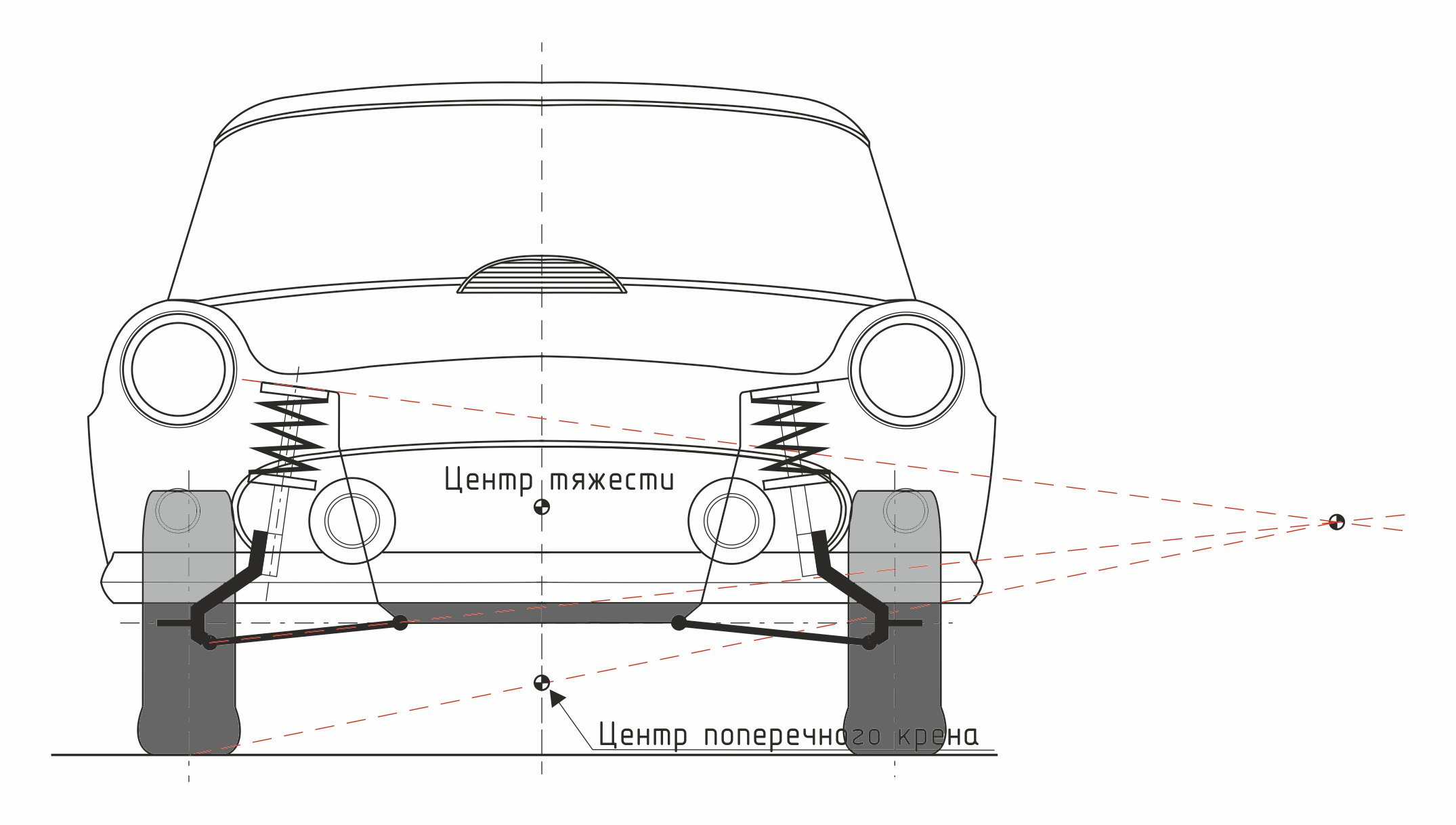
Finding the roll center of a MacPherson strut

The roll center of a vehicle is the notional point at which the cornering forces in the suspension are reacted to the vehicle body.

There are two definitions of roll center. The most commonly used is the geometric (or kinematic) roll center, whereas the Society of Automotive Engineers uses a force-based definition.

== Definition ==
- Geometric roll center is solely dictated by the suspension geometry, and can be found using principles of the instant center of rotation.
- Force based roll center, according to the US Society of Automotive Engineers, is "The point in the transverse vertical plane through any pair of wheel centers at which lateral forces may be applied to the sprung mass without producing suspension roll".

The lateral location of the roll center is typically at the center-line of the vehicle when the suspension on the left and right sides of the car are mirror images of each other.

The significance of the roll center can only be appreciated when the vehicle's center of mass is also considered. If there is a difference between the position of the center of mass and the roll center a moment arm is created. When the vehicle experiences angular velocity due to cornering, the length of the moment arm, combined with the stiffness of the springs and possibly anti-roll bars (also called 'anti-sway bar'), defines how much the vehicle will roll. This has other effects too, such as dynamic load transfer.

== Application ==
When the vehicle rolls the roll centers migrate. The roll center height has been shown to affect behavior at the initiation of turns such as nimbleness and initial roll control.

== Testing methods ==
Current methods of analyzing individual wheel instant centers have yielded more intuitive results of the effects of non-rolling weight transfer effects. This type of analysis is better known as the lateral-anti method. This is where one takes the individual instant center locations of each corner of the car and then calculates the resultant vertical reaction vector due to lateral force. This value then is taken into account in the calculation of a jacking force and lateral weight transfer. This method works particularly well in circumstances where there are asymmetries in left to right suspension geometry.

The practical equivalent of the above is to push laterally at the tire contact patch and measure the ratio of the change in vertical load to the horizontal force.

== See also ==
- Weight distribution
- Vehicle metrics
