= No-fault =

No-fault may refer to:

- No-fault divorce
- No-fault insurance
- No-fault liability also known as strict liability
