= List of truck types =

This List of truck types is intended to classify trucks and to provide links to articles on the various types. The three main classifications for road truck by weight are light trucks, medium trucks, and heavy trucks. Above this there are specialised very heavy trucks and transporters such as heavy haulers for moving oversized loads, and off-road heavy haul trucks used in mining which are too large for highway use without escorts and special permits.

== Small trucks ==
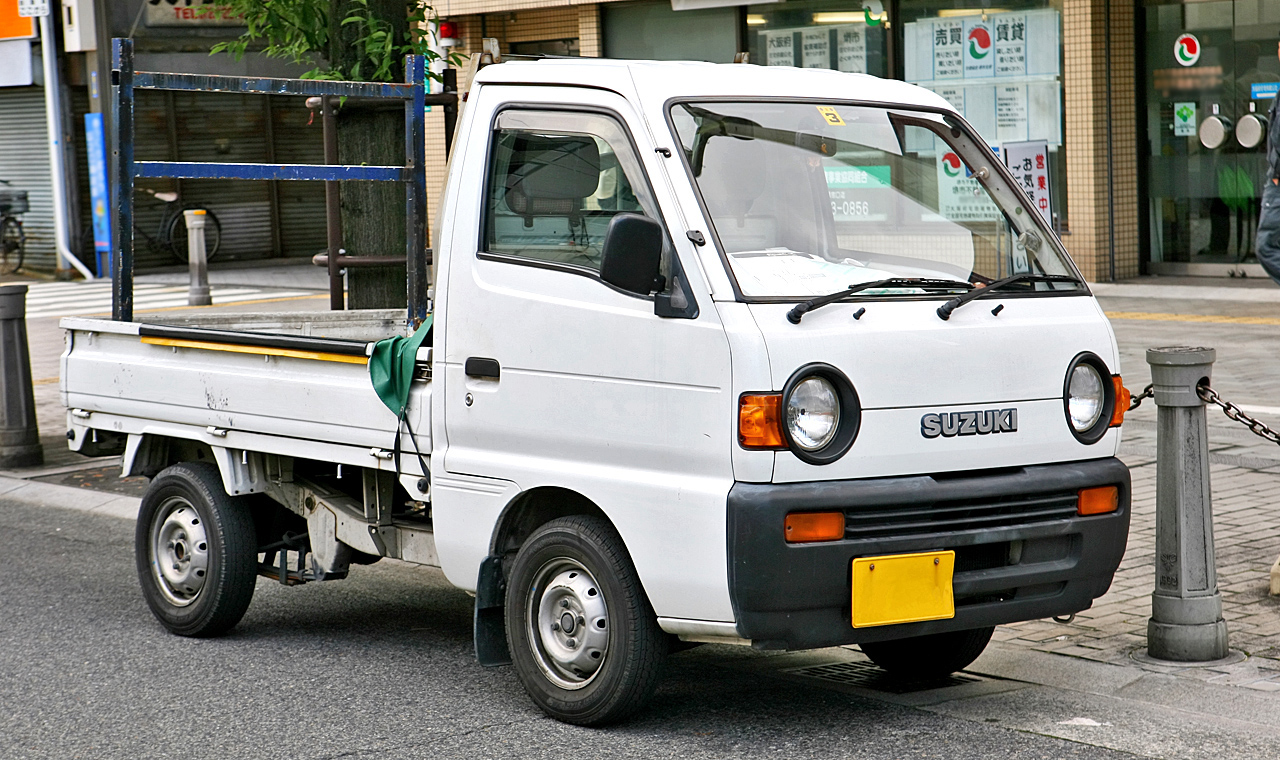
- Suzuki Carry, an example of a mini truck
  Mini trucks, small Commercial vehicles used for delivering light loads over short distances.

== Light trucks ==
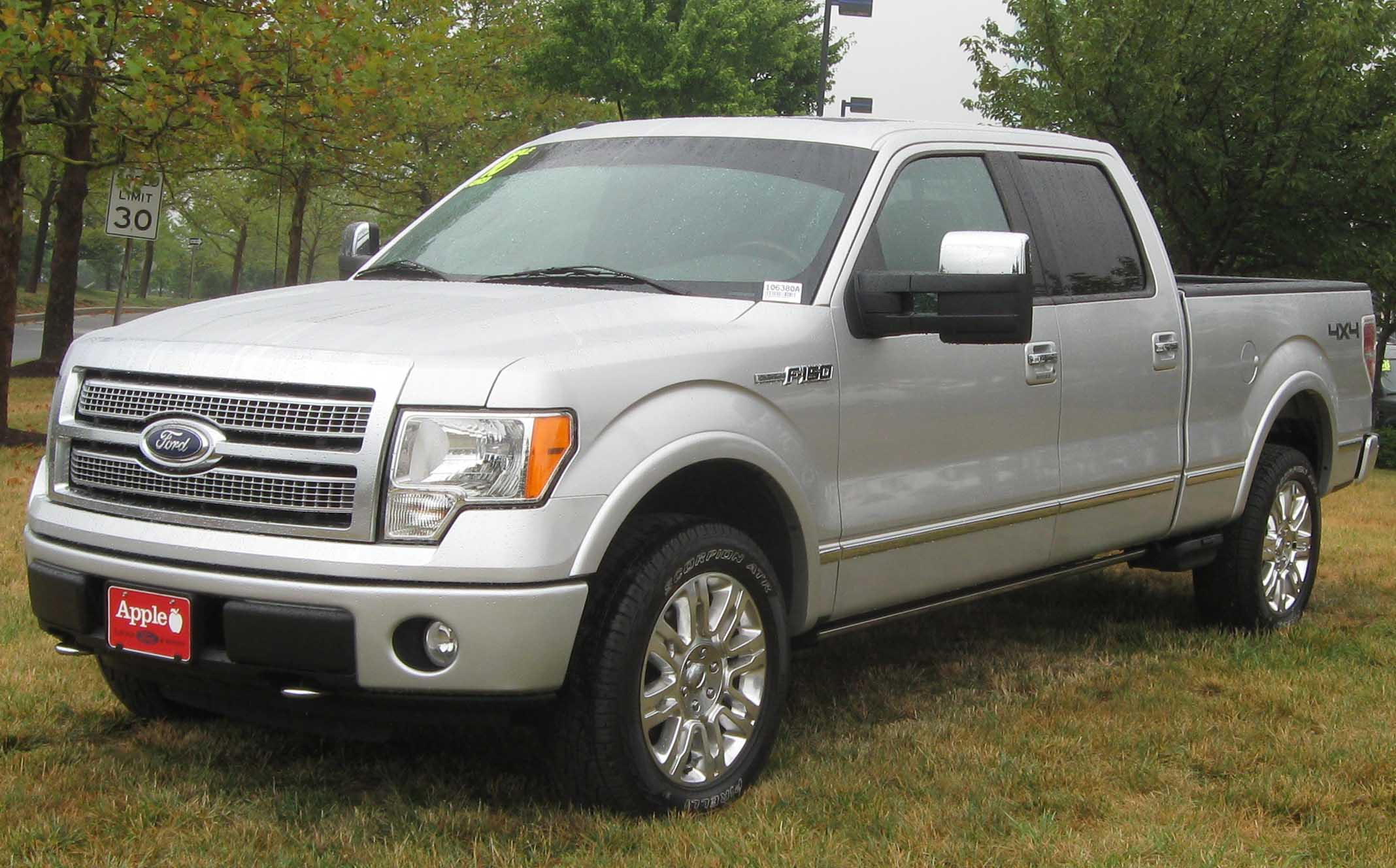
A pickup truck is a popular light truck

Light trucks are larger than mini trucks but smaller than medium trucks. In the US, they are defined as trucks that weigh 14000 lb (6350 kg) or less. There is no smaller classification.

- Minivan
- Sport utility vehicle
- Pickup truck/Ute
- Panel truck
  - Canopy express
  - Panel van
- Tow truck (may also be a medium or heavy truck)

== Medium trucks ==
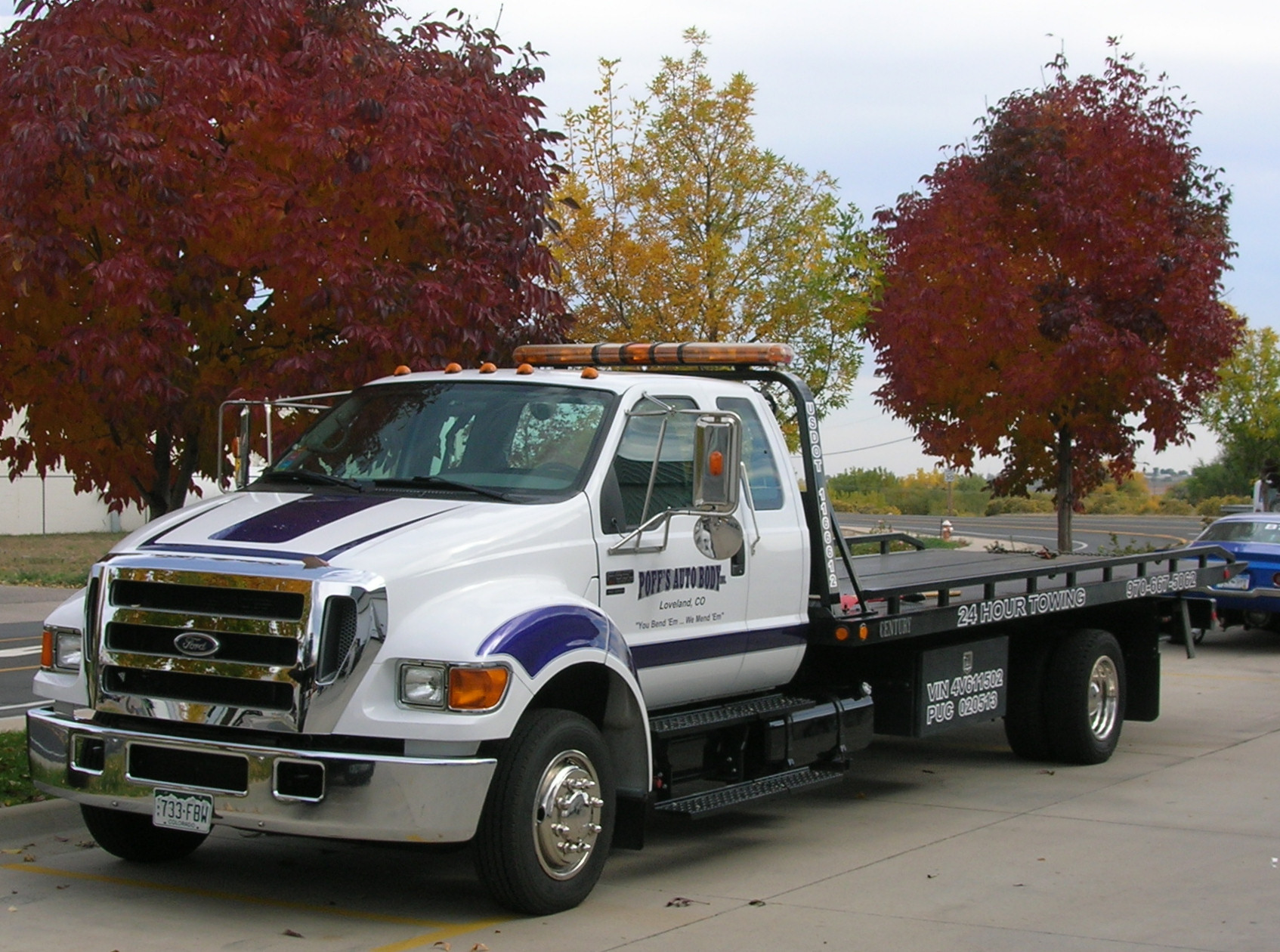
Ford F-650 flatbed

Medium trucks are larger than light-duty trucks such as minivans, SUVs, regular cab pickup trucks, extended cab pickup trucks, crew cab pickup trucks, low roof cargo vans, low roof crew vans, low roof passenger vans, medium roof cargo vans, medium roof crew vans, medium roof passenger vans, high roof cargo vans, high roof crew vans, high roof passenger vans, coupe utilities, panel trucks, canopy express vehicles, and panel vans, but lighter than the largest cargo trucks such as semi-trailer rigs. In the US, they are defined as weighing between 14001–26000 lb (6351–11793 kg). In North America, medium-duty trucks are larger than heavy-duty pickup trucks such as the Ford Super Duty, Ram Heavy Duty 2500/3500/4500/5500, Chevrolet Silverado HD, and GMC Sierra HD. They are also larger than full-size vans like the Ford E-Series/Club Wagon/Econoline, Dodge A-Series/B-Series/Ram Vans, Chevrolet Greenbrier/G-Series vans, Mercedes-Benz Sprinter, Dodge Sprinter, Ford Transit 150/250/350, Ram ProMaster, and Chevrolet Express/GMC Savana. Some trucks listed as medium also are made in heavy versions.

- Box truck
- Van
- Cutaway van chassis
- Medium Duty Truck such as Ford F-650 in North America
- Medium Standard Truck
- Platform truck
- Flatbed truck (may also be light-duty trucks)
- Stake bed truck (may also be light-duty trucks)
- Firetruck (may also be a heavy truck)
- Recreational Vehicle or Motorhome

The following are not types of trucks but types of use of the trucks listed above:

- Delivery truck, Multi-Stop truck, Bottler.

== Heavy trucks ==
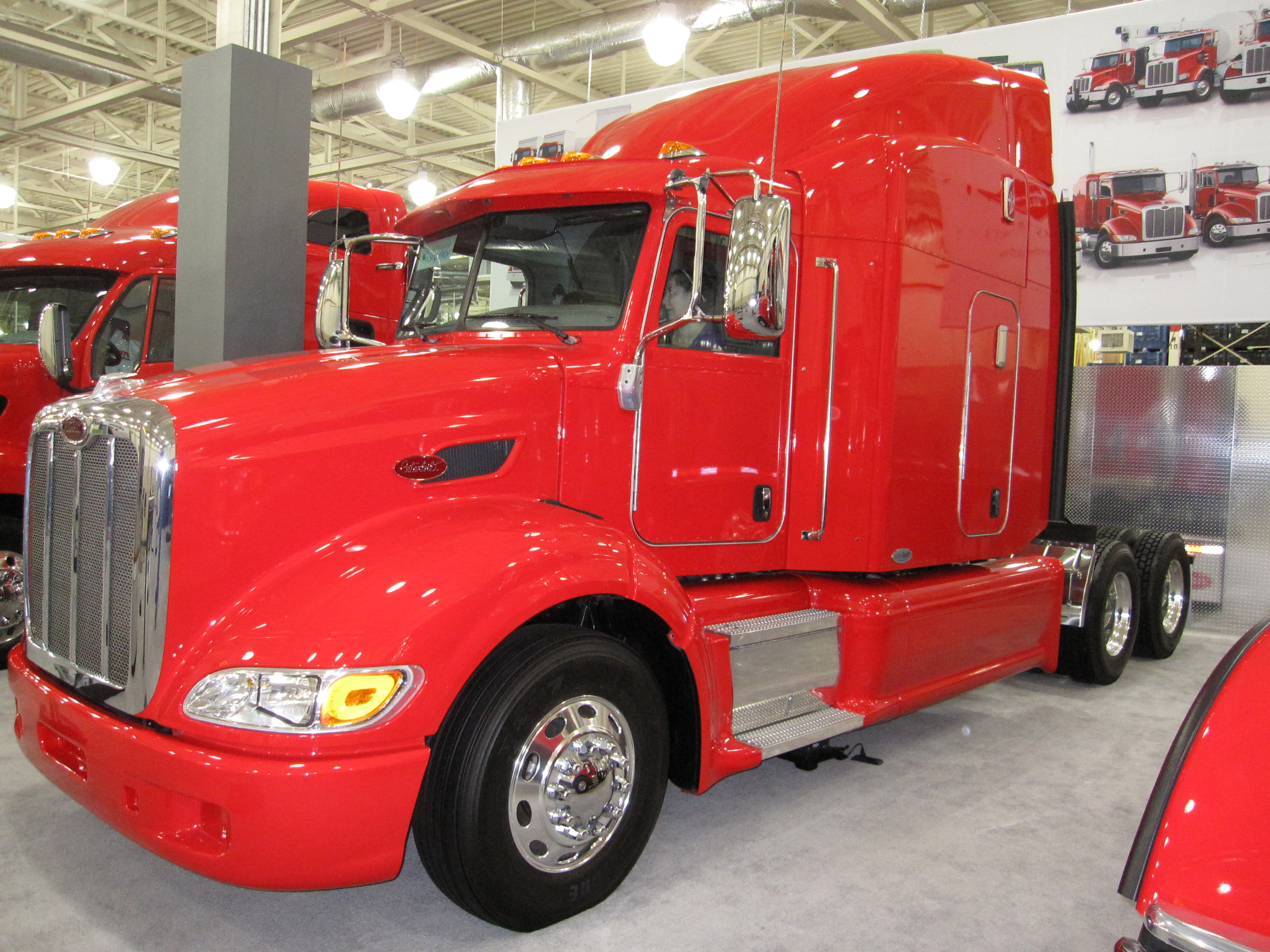
Peterbilt 386 tractor, a popular tractor unit for pulling semi-trailers

Heavy trucks are heavier than medium trucks. They are defined as weighing more than 26000 lb (11793 kg). There is no higher on-road classification.

Many heavy trucks listed are also made in medium duty versions:

- Concrete transport truck (cement mixer)
- Mobile crane
- Dump truck
- Logging truck
- Garbage truck
- Log carrier
- Refrigerator truck
- Tractor unit
- Tank truck

== Very heavy trucks and transporters ==
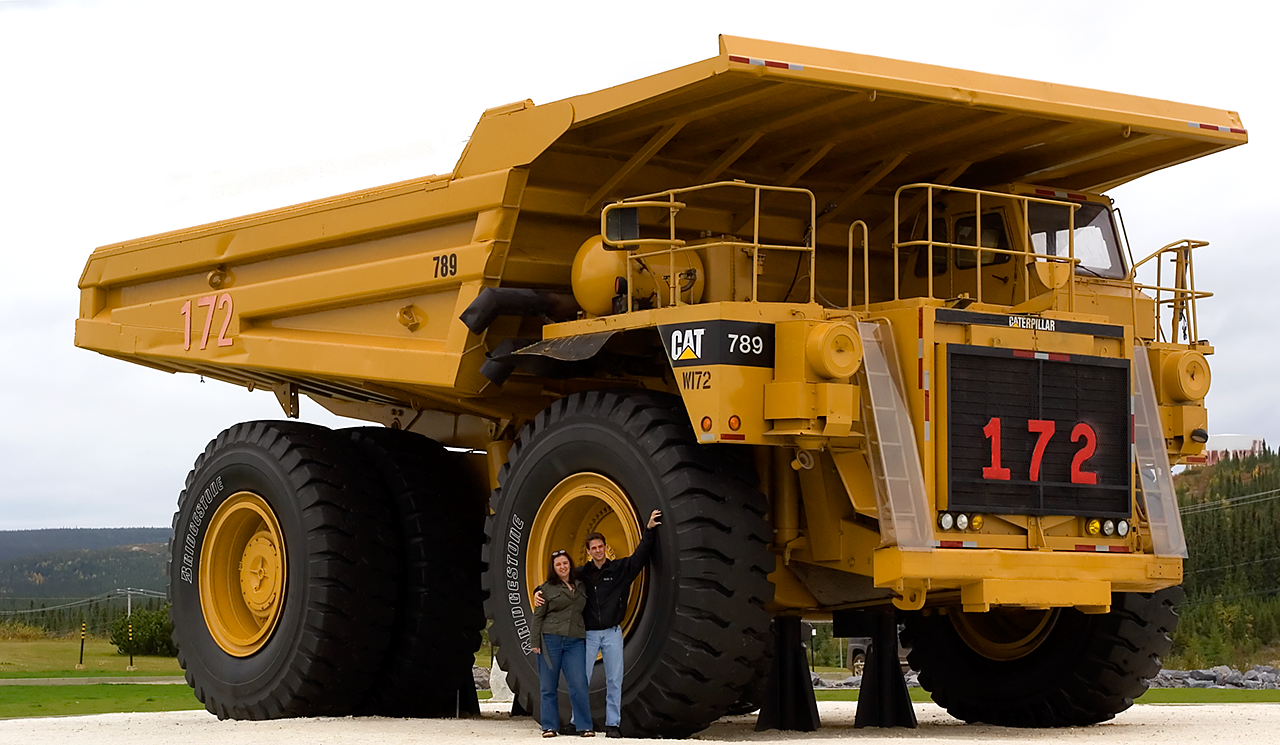
Haul truck

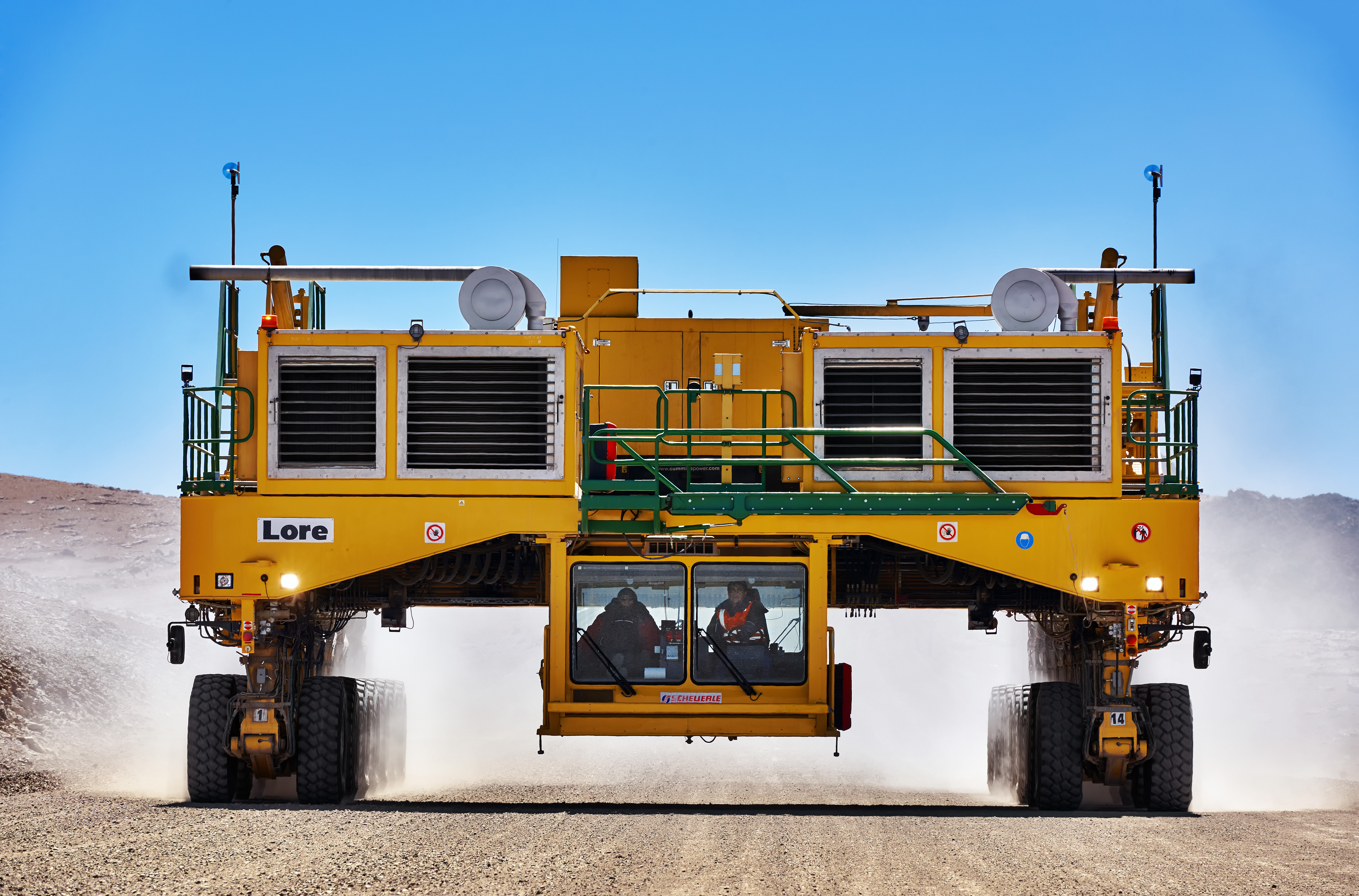
ALMA Transporter

Vehicles in this category are too large for highway use without escorts and special permits.

- Haul truck, an exceptionally large off-road dump truck, common in mining operations
- Ballast tractor, a very heavy weight power source for towing and pulling exceptional loads
- Heavy hauler, a combination of power source and very heavy weight transporter
- ALMA transporter is used for transportation of ALMA antennae.

== See also ==
- Commercial vehicle
- Construction equipment
- List of land vehicles types by number of wheels
- Tautliner
- Truck classification
