= Speed limits in the United States by jurisdiction =

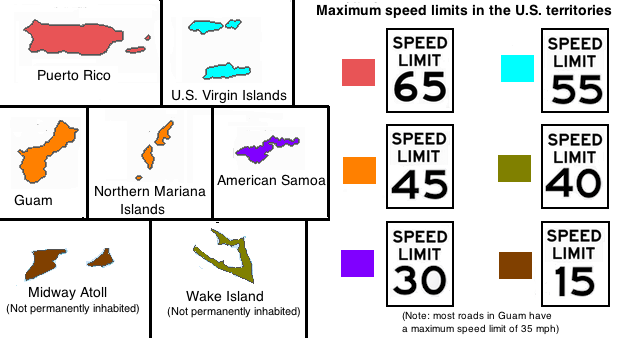
Maximum speed limits in various U.S. states and territories

Speed limits in the United States vary depending on jurisdiction. Rural freeway speed limits of 70 to 80 mph (113 to 129 km/h) are common in the Western United States, while such highways are typically posted at 65 or 70 mph (105 or 113 km/h) in the Eastern United States. States may also set separate speed limits for trucks and night travel along with minimum speed limits. The highest speed limit in the country is 85 mph (137 km/h), which is posted on a single stretch of tollway in exurban areas outside Austin, Texas. The lowest maximum speed limit in the country is 30 mph (48 km/h) in American Samoa. (Note: Midway Atoll has a lower maximum speed limit, but it is not permanently-inhabited.)

== Alabama ==
In Alabama, it is illegal to drive at a speed that is not "reasonable and prudent" for the current conditions and hazards. Drivers must also not drive so slowly that they impede the flow of traffic. If the speed limit is not otherwise posted, it is:

- 30 mph (48 km/h) in urban areas
- 35 mph (56 km/h) on unpaved roads
- 45 mph (72 km/h) on rural paved county roads
- 55 mph (89 km/h) on other two-lane roads
- 65 mph (105 km/h) on four-lane roads
- 70 mph (113 km/h) on Interstate Highways

Trucks carrying hazardous materials are not to exceed 55 miles per hour (89 km/h).

Although not a statutory default limit, the speed limit is usually 25 mph (40 km/h) in residential areas.

== Alaska ==
In Alaska, many of the major highways carry a 65-mile-per-hour (105 km/h) speed limit, including:

- A majority of the Parks Highway between Fairbanks and Willow (excepting slower zones through Nenana, Denali Park, Cantwell, and Healy)
- Most of the Richardson Highway between Valdez and North Pole
- On the Glenn Highway, the 35-mile (56 km) freeway between Wasilla and Anchorage, and most of the 100 miles (160 km) west of Glennallen
- The Seward Highway in Anchorage between 36th Avenue and Rabbit Creek Road, and other non-freeway parts of the Seward Highway south of Bird Point
- Most of the Alaska Highway between the Canadian border and Delta Junction

The Minnesota Drive Expressway features a 60-mile-per-hour (97 km/h) speed limit, as does the Richardson Highway between Fairbanks and North Pole.

Since the mid-1990s, Alaska's major highways have gradually been upgraded from 55 mph (89 km/h) to 60 mph (97 km/h) or 65 mph (105 km/h). However, several continue to carry the default 55 miles per hour (89 km/h) speed limit, including:

- The Sterling Highway
- The Tok Cut-Off
- The Haines Highway
- Portions of the Parks Highway and Seward Highway designated "safety zones"
- Portions of the Elliott Highway and Steese Highway close to Fairbanks

Engineering studies are needed to define which road segments to post a speed limit higher than 55 miles per hour (89 km/h).

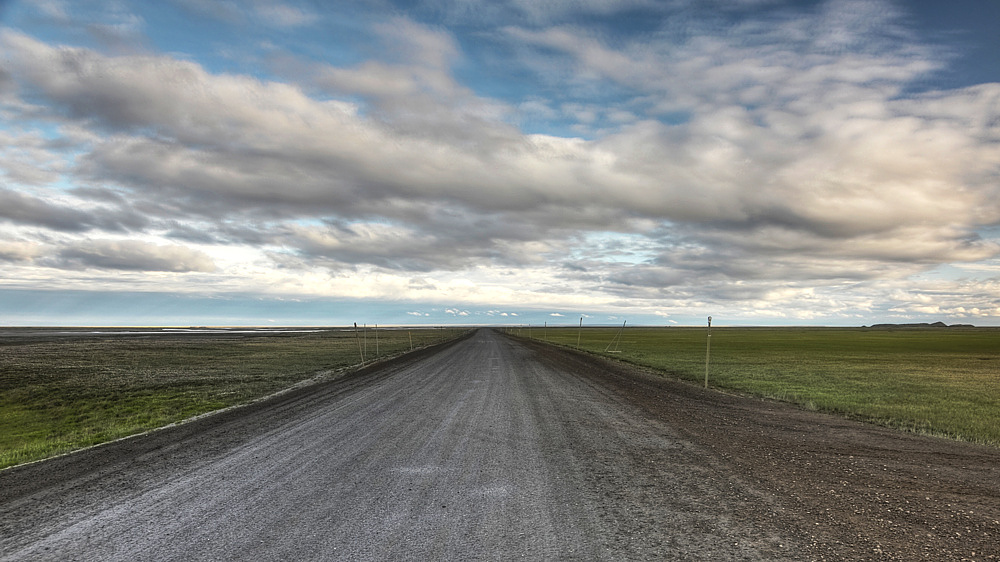
Dalton Highway in Alaska

The Dalton Highway and parts of the Elliot Highway are 50 mph (80 km/h).

Default speed limits in Alaska are:

- 20 mph (32 km/h) in alleys
- 20 mph (32 km/h) in a business district
- 25 mph (40 km/h) in a residential district
- 55 mph (89 km/h) on other roads

The speed limit when towing a mobile home is 45 mph (72 km/h).

== American Samoa ==
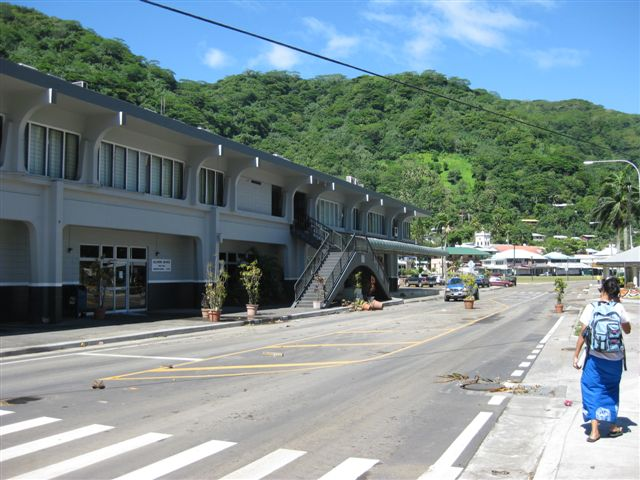
American Samoa Highway 001 on Tutuila

The maximum speed limit in American Samoa is 30 mph (48 km/h), with 15 mph (24 km/h) in residential areas. The 30 mph (48 km/h) speed limit is the lowest maximum speed limit of any state or permanently inhabited territory. Most areas have a speed limit of 25 mph (40 km/h).

== Arizona ==
The default speed limit outside of "business or residential" districts in Arizona is 65 mph (105 km/h); within those districts, the default speed limit is 25 mph (40 km/h). Specific locations in Maricopa County cities, such as Peoria, Laveen, and Tolleson, often have posted speed limits that may be lower. The default school zone speed limit is 15 mph (24 km/h), while some may be 25 to 35 mph (40 to 56 km/h). Exceeding these limits only in the best of driving conditions is considered prima facie evidence of speeding. Altered speed limits are not prima facie.

The maximum speed limit on Interstate Highways is 75 mph (121 km/h). This limit may be applied outside of "urbanized areas". However, Interstate 10 near the California border is reduced to 65 mph (105 km/h). Some portions of Interstate 15 have the same regulations due to sharp curves. There is an exception to urban highway in Casa Grande, with a speed limit of 75 mph (121 km/h), while other urban highways are capped at 55 or 65 mph (89 or 105 km/h). Within "business or residential" districts, exceeding the speed limit by more than 20 miles per hour (32 km/h) is a criminal offense. Within "urbanized areas", 55 miles per hour (89 km/h) speed limit citations are given for "waste of a finite resource". This exception only applies within a 10-mile-per-hour (16 km/h) threshold. As long as the speed does not exceed 65 mph (105 km/h), the infraction is not recorded as a traffic violation for the purposes of a point system.

Non-passenger vehicles in excess of 13 short tons (12 t), or "vehicles drawing a pole trailer" weighing more than 3 short tons (2.7 t) may not exceed 65 miles per hour (105 km/h) unless signs are posted that allow such a speed. Yet this does not differ from the default speed limit, and has the practical effect of requiring extra consideration for posting a standard speed limit sign in excess of 65 miles per hour (105 km/h). A non-numeric minimum speed limit is incorporated with the basic speed rule in Arizona, which also prohibits speeds higher than would be "reasonable and prudent".

Night speed limit signs are posted on some roads within Tucson city limits that do not have street lights. Examples: Fort Lowell Road from Oracle Road to Country Club Road, 22nd Street from Interstate 10 to Cherry Avenue.

In late 2025, Arizona Representative Nick Kupper introduced HB 2059 into the Arizona House of Representatives. The bill, dubbed the 'RAPID Act', if passed into law, would establish 'derestricted speed zones' with no posted speed limit on certain rural stretches of state and interstate highways across Arizona that meet certain prerequisite conditions.

== Arkansas ==
Urban districts are posted at 30 mph (48 km/h) by default. Outside of the municipal limits, two-lane state and federal highways have a speed limit of 55 mph (89 km/h) unless otherwise posted, and 2 lane county roads have a speed limit of 45 mph (72 km/h) unless otherwise posted. In June 2015, the Arkansas Highway Commission authorized the Arkansas Highway and Transportation Department (AHTD) to raise the speed limit on undivided 4 and 5 lane roads from 55 to 60 mph (89 to 97 km/h), and divided 4 lane roads from 55 to 65 mph (89 to 105 km/h); these changes affect 285 miles (459 km) of Arkansas highways. Furthermore, AHTD has established freeway default speed limits. Along rural freeways, the limit is 75 mph (121 km/h) while suburban freeways are posted at 65 mph (105 km/h). School zone speed limits apply only when children are present, or when a lighted beacon is on if one is provided, and such speed limits are set at 25 mph (40 km/h) unless otherwise posted. It is fairly common however that schools serving only higher grade levels will not have a school speed limit in rural areas or where such school sits more than 500 feet (150 m) off of the highway or street.

On March 16, 2017, the Arkansas House introduced a bill that would allow the state highway commission to increase speed limits up to 75 mph (121 km/h) in rural interstate freeways, upon completion of a "traffic and engineering investigation" and sets rural non-divided highway speed limits to 65 mph (105 km/h). This bill became law on April 7, 2017, however no highways were immediately given a 75 mph limit.

On April 8, 2019, Act 784 was approved which raises the speed limit to 75 mph (121 km/h) / 70 mph (113 km/h) for trucks weighing more than 26,000 lb (12 t) on all rural freeways effective July 1, 2020. The new law eliminates the requirement that the Highway Commission conduct a traffic study before raising the limit; instead, a study will be required to justify lowering the speed limit.

As of August 5, 2020, new signs are up indicating the speed limit increase from 70 to 75 mph (70 mph for trucks) on I-40 west of Little Rock to the Oklahoma border.

== California ==
=== Basic speed law ===
California's "Basic Speed Law", part of the California Vehicle Code, defines the maximum speed at which a car may travel as a "reasonable and prudent" speed, given road conditions. The reasonable speed may be lower than the posted speed limit in conditions such as gravel—thus limiting the Assured Clear Distance Ahead (ACDA). Basic speed laws are statutized reinforcements of the centuries-old common law negligence doctrine as specifically applied to vehicular speed. California Vehicle Code section 22350 is typical; it states that "No person shall drive a vehicle upon a highway at a speed greater than is reasonable ... and in no event at a speed which endangers the safety of persons or property".

Speed limits in California are mandated by statute to be set: (1) at or below the 85th percentile operating speed; as determined by a traffic and engineering survey—this is the speed that no more than 15% of traffic exceeds; or (2) the prima facie limits mandated when certain criteria are met as described in the vehicle code. These criteria include school zone, alleyway, and residential area.

If the 85th percentile operating speed as measured by a Traffic and Engineering Survey exceeds the design speed, compulsory legal protection is given to that speed—even if it is unsafe with regard to certain technical aspects such as sight distance. This speed creep may continue until the 85th percentile operating speed is comparable to speed psychologically perceived as uncomfortably hazardous.

The theory behind California's 85th percentile statute is that, as a policy, most of the electorate should be seen as lawful, and limits must be practical to enforce. However, there are some circumstances where motorists do not tend to process all the risks involved, and as a mass choose a poor 85th percentile speed. This rule in substance is a process for voting the speed limit by driving; and in contrast to delegating the speed limit to an engineering expert. (Note: Public opposition to speed limits being set by an authority, often arise because such agency has been viewed as abusing its power—such as by arbitrary indiscretion or by creating "speed traps". Because an expert can theoretically calculate a safer speed limit, than the populace's vote by driving, it is beneficial that local governments preserve strong public trust with their integrity in speed regulation. See A Policy on Geometric Design of Highways and Streets, AASHTO, 4th Ed., 2001; ISBN 1-56051-156-7)

The numerical limit set by Caltrans engineers for speed limit signs, generally found on all non-controlled-access routes, is considered a presumptive maximum "reasonable and prudent" speed.

Many speed limit signs are labeled "maximum speed", usually when the limit is 55 mph (89 km/h) or higher. When the National Maximum Speed Law was enacted, California was forced to create a new legal signage category, "Maximum Speed", to indicate to drivers that the Basic Speed Law did not apply for speeds over the federally mandated speed cap; rather, it would be a violation to exceed the fixed maximum speed indicated on the sign, regardless of whether the driver's speed could be considered "reasonable and prudent".

A driver can receive a traffic citation for violating the Basic Speed Law even if their speed is below the "maximum speed limit" if road, weather, or traffic conditions make that speed unsafe. However, because the Basic Speed Law establishes prima facie limits, not absolute ones, they can also defend against a citation for speeding "by competent evidence that the speed in excess of said limits did not constitute a violation of the basic speed law at the time, place and under the conditions then existing", per section 22351(b) of the California Vehicle Code. Thus, a driver who operates over the speed limit, but less than the usual 65 mph (105 km/h) maximum speed (55 mph (89 km/h) for two-lane undivided highways, isn't necessarily violating California's speed laws where the driver's speed was otherwise safe under the circumstances.

=== Speed limits ===
Rural freeways, such as parts of I-5, I-8, I-10, I-15, I-40, I-205, I-215, I-505, I-580, US 101 (until 2023), CA 14, CA 58, and CA 99 have 70 mph (113 km/h) speed limits. The highest speed limit on I-80 is 65 mph (105 km/h) because it passes almost exclusively through urban and mountainous areas. However, the speed limit on the San Francisco–Oakland Bay Bridge and in San Francisco is only 50 mph (80 km/h). In downtown Los Angeles, the maximum speed limit is 55 mph (89 km/h). This includes the entire length of the Pasadena Freeway between Pasadena and downtown Los Angeles, and portions of the Hollywood, Santa Ana, Santa Monica, and Harbor Freeways. The default limit on two-lane roads is 55 mph (89 km/h). Some two-lane roads can be 60 mph (97 km/h) for some locations in California. However, Caltrans or a local agency can post a speed of up to 65 mph (105 km/h) after an engineering study.

There is a 55 mph (89 km/h) speed limit for trucks with at least 3 axles and all vehicles while towing.

In California, the maximum speed in school zones is 15 or 25 mph (24 or 40 km/h), but may only be in effect when children are present within that school zone.

== Colorado ==
The maximum speed limit in Colorado is 75 mph (121 km/h) on rural Interstate highways and the toll road portion of SH 470 (E-470), although Interstate 70 in the Rocky Mountains has a 65 mph (105 km/h) limit because of steep grades and curves and a 50 mph (80 km/h) limit at the east and west ends of the Eisenhower Tunnel. The maximum speed limit on other rural highways is 65 mph (105 km/h).

There are also basic prima facie speed limits in Colorado.

- 20 mph (32 km/h) on narrow, winding mountain roads
- 25 mph (40 km/h) in any business district
- 30 mph (48 km/h) in any residential district
- 40 mph (64 km/h) on open mountain highways

=== Night speed limits ===
On certain stretches of rural highways, notably US 160 between Durango and Pagosa Springs and US 550 between Durango and Silverton, nighttime speed limits are in effect during peak migratory periods for area wildlife. Speeding fines are doubled when nighttime speed limits are in effect.

== Connecticut ==
Speed limits in Connecticut are normally 65 mph (105 km/h) on rural freeways; up to 55 mph (89 km/h) on rural divided and up to 50 mph (80 km/h) on rural undivided highways. In urban areas speed limits vary from 25 mph (40 km/h) on residential streets and central business districts, 30 to 40 mph (48–64 km/h) on arterial roadways, and from 45 to 55 mph (72–89 km/h) on urban freeways. Limited-access divided highways have a minimum speed of 40 mph (64 km/h), but this is not always posted, and is rarely enforced. Connecticut was among the last states to raise its maximum speed limit from 55 mph (89 km/h) originally established by the National Maximum Speed Law in 1974. The statewide maximum speed limit was increased from 55 mph (89 km/h) to 65 mph (105 km/h) on October 1, 1998, making Connecticut the last state in the continental United States to raise its speed limit above 55 mph (89 km/h).

Speed limits for all roads within Connecticut—including local streets—are established by the State Traffic Commission, an agency composed of members of the Department of Motor Vehicles (CTDMV), the Department of Emergency Services and Public Protection (DESPP), and the Department of Transportation (CONNDOT).

The State Traffic Commission typically sets speed limits following engineering studies performed by CONNDOT. Data used in setting speed limits includes traffic volume vs. roadway capacity, design speed, road geometry, the spacing of intersections and/or interchanges, the number of driveways and curb cuts, and accident rates.

Municipalities are normally required to seek approval from the State Traffic Commission for changes to the posted speed limits on locally owned streets after appropriate engineering studies are performed.

Speeding fines are doubled in school zones when children are present, and construction areas when workers are present.

Prior to the enactment of the National Speed Limit Law in 1974, Connecticut permitted a maximum speed limit of 70 mph (113 km/h) on rural freeways.

On March 26, 2018, contractors started installing new speed limit signs on I-84 between the Waterbury/Cheshire line and the interchange with CT Route 9, increasing the speed limit to 65 mph (105 km/h). This action follows a DOT study showing the 85th percentile speed of free flowing traffic on this segment averaged 77 mph (124 km/h).

== Delaware ==
In Delaware, four roads carry a 65 mph (105 km/h) speed limit: Interstate 95 from the Maryland line to the southern junction with I-495, Interstate 495, US 301, and Delaware Route 1 between the Puncheon Run Connector in Dover and US 13 in Tybouts Corner. Delaware Route 1 between Trap Shooters Road and the Puncheon Run Connector in Dover and between US 13 and the I-95 and Delaware Route 7 interchange, along with the Puncheon Run Connector, have a speed limit of 60 mph (97 km/h). The remainder of I-95 between the southern junction with I-495 and the Pennsylvania line is 55 mph (89 km/h) while the freeway portion of Delaware Route 141 and Interstate 295 are 50 mph (80 km/h). Prior to the National Maximum Speed Law that went into effect nationwide, I-95 used to have a 60 mph (97 km/h) speed limit except around Wilmington. In May 2015, the state of Delaware increased the speed limit on Interstate 95 from 55 to 65 mph (89 to 105 km/h) between the Maryland state line and the I-495 interchange. In January 2017, the speed limit on Delaware Route 1 between Trap Shooters Road and the Puncheon Run Connector in Dover was increased from 55 to 60 mph (89 to 97 km/h) while the speed limit on the Puncheon Run Connector was increased from 50 to 60 mph (80 to 97 km/h).

All rural two-lane state-owned roads have 50 mph (80 km/h) speed limits, while all urban speed limits, regardless of location, are held at 25 mph (40 km/h) for two-lane roads and up to 35 mph (56 km/h) for four-lane roads. Four lane highways such as US 13, US 113, portions of US 40 near Bear and Glasgow, and the at-grade portions of DE 1 are normally 55 mph (89 km/h).

School zones have 20 mph (32 km/h) speed limits.

Interstate 495, which forms a bypass around Wilmington, features variable speed limit signs for environmental purposes. These signs typically display a 65 mph (105 km/h) speed limit, but this limit changes to 55 mph (89 km/h) on days when air quality is a concern. The limit is also lowered during construction, weather conditions, and when accidents occur.

All neighborhoods and subdivisions in Delaware have a maximum speed limit of 25 mph (40 km/h) as set by state law. Frequent advertising campaigns on in-state radio stations remind residents of this (as of January 2013).

== District of Columbia ==
The District of Columbia has a maximum speed limit of 55 mph (89 km/h), although speed limits as low as 40 mph (64 km/h) can be posted, such as on the Eisenhower Freeway. There are no rural roads in the District of Columbia.

== Florida ==
Florida has a maximum speed limit of 70 mph (113 km/h), found on freeways, including rural Interstate Highways, some urban freeways including I-4 in Lakeland, I-75 in Tampa and Miami (where I-75 ends), I-95 near Daytona Beach and from Military Trail to Florida State Route 706 in Palm Beach County, portions of the Orlando area toll roads such as SR 417 and SR 429, Florida's Turnpike through Port St Lucie and Orlando, I-10 close to Tallahassee, and most other rural limited access toll roads such as the Suncoast Parkway and the Beachline Expressway and rural portions of Florida's Turnpike. It can also be found on a portion of US 301 known as the Starke Bypass. 65 mph (105 km/h) is typical on rural 4-lane highways (such as US 19 north of St. Petersburg, among other US Highways) as well as most other urban freeways and tollways. If a divided highway is considered urban, even if it appears rural, the maximum speed limit will not be higher than 60 mph (97 km/h), such as on US-301 south of Baldwin. Rural two-lane roads typically have a speed limit of 55 mph (89 km/h) (the default limit for such roads) or 60 mph (97 km/h) depending on the roadway's design. This is often done on rural state roads (such as SR 471) and US Highways (such as US 98 along most of the state's panhandle).

Statutory speed limits in Florida are as follows:

- 30 mph (48 km/h) within municipal districts
- 55 mph (89 km/h) for all other roadways

FDOT is authorized to change these limits following an engineering study, subject to the following maximum limits:

- 70 mph (110 km/h) on limited access highways (regardless of the lane count)
- 65 mph (105 km/h) on strictly rural divided highways with 2 or more lanes in each direction (outside of an urban area)
- 60 mph (97 km/h) on all other roadways

While these maximum limits are not applicable for roadways on the Turnpike System, no such limit currently exists above 70 mph (110 km/h).

Cities and counties have the ability to set individual speed limits of up to 60 mph (97 km/h) on their own roadways, in addition to changing the default residential speed limit down to 20 mph (32 km/h).

Florida typically does not post night speed limits, but there are a few exceptions. For the most part, these nighttime reduced speeds are located in wildlife preserves for such endangered species as the Florida panther and the key deer. Most of the Tamiami Trail through the Big Cypress National Preserve has a 45 mph (72 km/h) night speed limit. On some stretches of road where the speed limit is reduced at night, the daytime speed limit sign is non-reflective, such that at night, only the night limit is visible.

Florida's minimum speed limit on Interstate Highways is 50 mph (80 km/h) in 70 mph zones. In 55 mph, and 65 mph urban interstate zones, the minimum is 40 mph (64 km/h). At one time, these minimum speeds required signage, but these limits have since been codified in state law; signs indicating these minimum speeds still exist but now serve only as reminders.

Florida also does not impose lower truck speed limits. As such, all traffic is permitted to travel at the same speed.

School zones in Florida usually have 10–25 mph (16–40 km/h) limits. Most have flashing yellow lights activated during the times they are in effect, as well as accompanying signs that post the times these reduced speed limits are effective. All are strictly enforced and carry an increased penalty for violations.

== Georgia ==
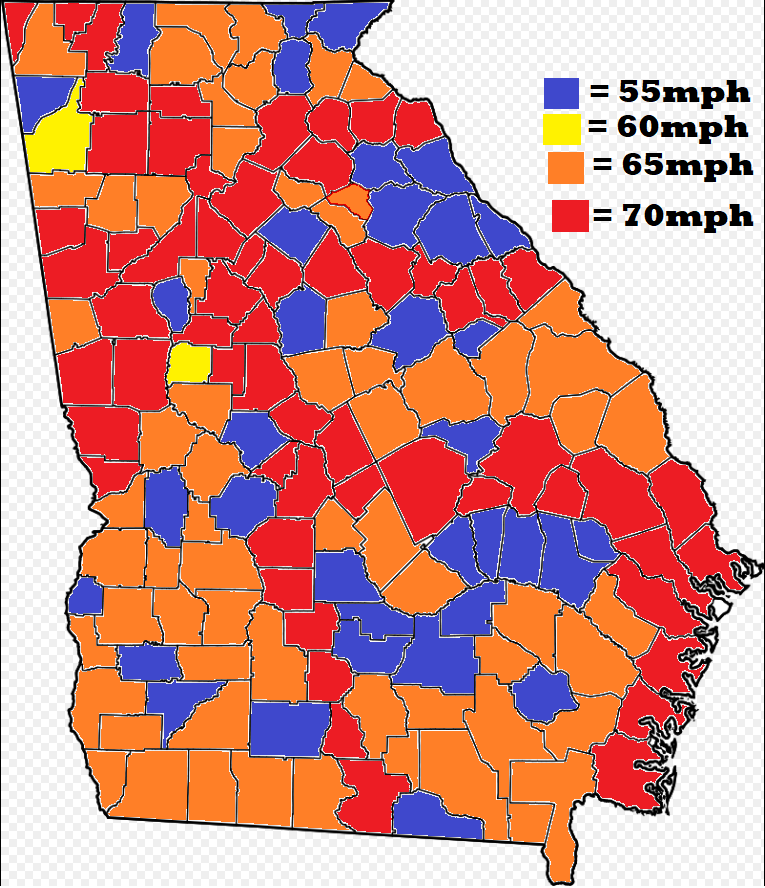
Maximum speed limits per county in Georgia.

Rural Interstate Highways are posted at 70 mph (113 km/h). Until 2014, sections of Interstates passing through a municipality or metropolitan area with a population over fifty thousand were capped at 55–65 mph (89–105 km/h). However, a new law has permitted urban interstates to now be posted as high as 70 mph, and some have already reflected this change, such as I-95 through Brunswick, I-85 in Gwinnett County, I-75 in Macon, Valdosta, and Tifton, and I-185 in Columbus. Urban freeways, such as I-285 and SR 400 in the Atlanta area, are signed at 65 mph (105 km/h); these were recently increased from 55 mph (89 km/h) (with variable speed limits in the northern portions). I-95 through suburban Savannah between exits 102 and 99, I-16, from the interchange with I-75 in central Macon eastbound past Exit 2, and east of exit 157, with the interchange for I-95, is also at 65 mph. Portions of I-20 in Atlanta are posted at 60 mph (97 km/h). Most non-interstate freeways such as the Athens perimeter highway, are posted at 65 mph.

Four lane arterials and expressways can be posted as high as 65 mph (105 km/h). However, Dillon's Rule enables counties outside municipalities to keep four-lane GRIP corridors at 55 mph (89 km/h). However, in recent years, US 1 between Augusta and Wrens raised the speed limit to 65 mph. Other rural four-lane highways with a 65 mph include portions of SR 540 west of Sandersville, US 441 between Milledgeville and north of Dublin, US 25 between Augusta and Statesboro, SR 88 between Sandersville, and Wrens, SR 16 between Griffin and I-75, much of US 341 between Brunswick and I-75, and much of US 82 in South Georgia.

Two lane state roads by default are posted at 55 mph (89 km/h). County maintained roads will rarely have speed limits above 55 mph (89 km/h) in middle & south Georgia, 45 mph (72 km/h) in north Georgia. Both in the Atlanta area, Ronald Reagan Parkway is posted at 50 mph (80 km/h) as a county maintained freeway and Sugarloaf Parkway is posted at 55 mph (89 km/h) along its new eastern freeway portion.

Inside the municipality, speed limits are generally posted at 35 mph (56 km/h) while it is 25–30 mph (40–48 km/h) in the downtown area.

All roadways maintained by GDOT that are subject to speed limit reductions are given advanced notice with signage that says "SPEED ZONE AHEAD". Furthermore, GDOT has a policy of doing 5–10 mph (8.0–16.1 km/h) increments but never higher than 10 mph.

Georgia is one of few states with anti-speed trap laws passed in the late 1990s. Speed violations less than 15 mph (24 km/h) over the speed limit will have no points assessed. Fines are not assessed for motorists going less than 5 mph (8.0 km/h) over the speed limit. In 2009, Georgia introduced the "Super Speeder" law, which adds an additional speeding fine (above base fine and court costs) of $200 for motorists convicted of traveling 15 mph (24 km/h) or more over the posted speed limit.

== Guam ==
The maximum speed limit in Guam is 45 mph (72 km/h), with 35–45 mph (56–72 km/h) in rural areas and 25–35 mph (40–56 km/h) in residential areas. On most major roads, 35 mph (56 km/h) is the maximum speed limit.

== Hawaii ==
Hawaii was the last state to raise its maximum speed limit after the National Maximum Speed Law was repealed in 1995, and still has the lowest maximum speed limit of any state. In 2002, following public outcry after a controversial experiment with speed enforcement using traffic enforcement cameras, the state Department of Transportation raised the speed limit to 60 mph (97 km/h) on Interstate H-1 between Kapolei and Waipahu, and Interstate H-3 between the Tetsuo Harano Tunnels and the junction with H-1. All other freeways, including Interstate H-2, have a maximum speed limit of 55 mph (89 km/h), with the limit dropping to 45 mph (72 km/h) in central Honolulu. Other highways generally have speed limits of 55 mph (89 km/h) and in many cases much less. On July 6, 2016, Governor David Ige signed a bill to allow the speed limit on Saddle Road to increase from 55 to 60 mph (89 to 97 km/h) (the limit was increased in the week of February 5, 2017).

Hawaii has a minimum speed along much of Interstate H-1 of only 10 mph (16 km/h) below the speed limit. The minimum speed is usually 45 mph (72 km/h) when the speed limit is 55 mph (89 km/h), and 40 mph (64 km/h) when the speed limit is 50 mph (80 km/h).

== Idaho ==
The speed limit on a freeway in Idaho is generally 80 mph (129 km/h) in rural areas and 65 mph (105 km/h) in urban areas. Trucks are limited to 70 mph (113 km/h). Generally single-lane rural roads have 65 mph (105 km/h) limits, and multi-lane rural roads have 70 mph (113 km/h) limits. Roads with traffic lights are posted at 60 mph (97 km/h) or below. The school zone speed limit in Idaho is 20 mph (32 km/h).

Idaho senator Bart Davis brought SB 1284a to the House of Representatives for discussion in early 2014. The bill passed the Senate on February 25 and was signed into law by Governor Butch Otter on March 18, 2014, which was set to raise the speed limit on rural interstates to 80 mph (129 km/h) on July 1, 2014, the same date Wyoming raised its speed limit. Days before the law was to go into effect, however, it was put on hold in order to allow a more thorough review of the effects of a raised speed limit. A vote on July 14, 2014, approved the 80 mph (129 km/h) increase on limited sections of interstates in the southern portions of Idaho. Studies began for other areas later of that summer. The bill also would raise truck and two-lane highway speed limits to 70 mph (113 km/h). As of July 24, 2014, the new 80 mph (129 km/h) signs are up on rural Idaho Interstates.

On March 22, 2017, the speed limit on a four-lane, divided stretch of US 20 between Idaho Falls and Ashton was raised from 65 mph (105 km/h) to 70 mph (113 km/h).

Prior to the national reduction in January 1974 to 55 mph (89 km/h), Idaho's speed limit was 70 mph (113 km/h) for interstates and 60 mph (97 km/h) on other highways. Effective July 1, 2026, separate truck speed limits will be abolished on most Idaho highways.

== Illinois ==
Interstate Highways in Illinois are usually posted with both minimum and maximum speed limits, except in some urban areas, particularly Chicago. The standard speed limit is 70 mph for rural freeways, a 45 mph minimum speed limit, 65 mph for other 4 lane divided highways, and 55 mph for all other highways. Urban freeway/interstate speed limits can range from as low as 45 mph in downtown Chicago, where all the major interstates merge, to as high as 70 mph in the outer portions of the Chicago and East St. Louis metro areas, and in some smaller cities. All the expressways leading directly out of downtown Chicago, which are The Dan Ryan Expressway, The Stevenson Expressway, The Eisenhower Expressway, and The Kennedy Expressway, have a 55 mph speed limit. Other expressways that branch off of the main ones leaving downtown, such as The Edens Expressway and The Bishop Ford Expressway, also carry a 55 mph limit. The Chicago Skyway does carry a 55 mph limit, but the tolled portion is signed at 45 mph. Lake Shore Drive carries a 40 mph speed limit from its northern terminus to E 31st Street, and from there to the end of the expressway, the speed limit is 45 mph. Some interstates in small cities (e.g. I-55/74 through Bloomington-Normal, I-39/90 through the Rockford area, I-57 through Champaign-Urbana) do not have reduced speed limits, and stretches of I-90 and I-355 in the Chicago suburbs are also signed at 70 mph. Most freeways and interstates in Cook, DuPage, and Lake Counties, and some interstates and freeways in Will County maintain a 55-60 mph speed limit. Due to the high population density, the only freeways in Cook County that exceed a speed limit of 60 mph are I-57 at the southern edge of the county, part of I-80 between Central Ave and Harlem Ave, I-90 west of Mt. Prospect Rd., and the southern segment of I-355, which passes through Cook County briefly before crossing into Will County to both the north and south. As of January 2010, a reduced speed limit posted in a construction zone must be obeyed 24 hours a day, regardless of whether workers are present.

As of March 27, 2018, the speed limit on I-90 from Randall Rd. in Elgin to Mt. Prospect Rd. in Des Plaines has been increased to 70 mph, and from Mt. Prospect Rd. to the beginning of the Kennedy Expressway, it has been increased to 60 mph. I-290 is posted at 60 mph for a few miles near Schaumburg, from IL-72 down to shortly before the I-355 exit.

== Indiana ==
In Indiana speed limits on Interstate Highways are usually 70 mph (113 km/h) for cars and 65 mph (105 km/h) for trucks with a gross vehicular weight (GVW) of 26,000 pounds (12,000 kg) or greater. In urban areas, it is generally 55 mph (89 km/h), except stretches of Interstate 70 in Indianapolis where it is 50 mph (80 km/h). In suburban areas, it is 65 mph (105 km/h) for cars and 60 mph (97 km/h) for trucks. On Interstate 469 in Fort Wayne (Indiana's 2nd largest city) the speed limit is still set at 70 mph. In the Louisville metro, In Clark & Floyd County, I-65 & I-265 remain at 65 mph for all vehicles despite it being suburban. The Indiana Toll Road also carries a minimum speed limit of 45 mph (72 km/h) as part of its internal toll road regulations.

Most non-Interstate Highways are 55 mph (89 km/h), but some rural four-lane divided highways are set at 60 mph (97 km/h). These limits often decrease to 30–50 mph (48–80 km/h) approaching urban areas, and within cities a speed limit of 20–30 mph (32–48 km/h) is not uncommon, though larger arterial roads within cities may reach as high as 45 mph (72 km/h). On February 6, 2012, the Indiana Toll Road was raised from the Illinois state line to mile marker 20 to 70 mph (113 km/h) after a major highway reconstruction project.

Effective July 1, 2025, the speed limit on I-465 was increased from 55 mph to 65 mph.

== Iowa ==
In Iowa, the majority of highways have a 55 mph (90 km/h) speed limit. Rural Interstate Highways carry a 70 mph (115 km/h) limit and a 40 mph (65 km/h) minimum. Urban Interstate limits generally range from 55 to 65 mph (90 to 105 km/h), but may be lower in areas. Four-lane roads may have a 65 mph (105 km/h) limit. If the road is built to freeway standards, such as US 20 between I-35 and Dubuque, it may have a minimum speed limit, but otherwise four-lane roads carry no minimum limit so slow-moving farm vehicles may use the roadway.

Starting July 1, 2026, all two-lane roads currently subjected to a 55 mph speed limit will be changed to 60 mph, with no changes to other speed limits.

== Kansas ==
After the National Maximum Speed Limit was repealed, Kansas raised its general interstate speed limit to 70 mph (113 km/h); a study found "no statistically significant increases in crash, fatal crash and fatality rates were noted during the after period on either rural or urban interstate highway networks. On the other hand, statistically significant increases in crash, fatal crash and fatality rates were observed on the 2-lane rural highway network.". In 2011, Governor Sam Brownback signed legislation raising Kansas' top speed limit to 75 mph (121 km/h) on rural Interstates and limited access portions of U.S. Routes, effective July 1, 2011. The Kansas Department of Transportation announced on June 21, 2011, that 807 miles of roadway, comprising the rural areas of I-70, I-35, I-135, the Kansas Turnpike and the freeway-improved sections of US-69 and US-81, will be raised to 75 mph. Other four-lane, non-limited access divided highways have a speed limit of 70 mph, with 65 mph on two-lane undivided roads, and 55 mph on township roads. Prior to the National Maximum Speed Limit, the speed limit on the Kansas Turnpike used to be 80 mph (129 km/h), but was reduced to 75 mph on August 17, 1970. The minimum speed limit on Kansas Interstates is 40 mph.

== Kentucky ==
Kentucky generally has a 70 mph speed limit on rural freeways as of 2007. The speed limit is reduced to 55 on multi-lane highways in some urban areas (I-71/75 south of Cincinnati, I-64, I-65, I-71 and I-264 in Louisville, and KY 4 in Lexington. There are two 50 mph areas in Louisville. One approaching the Sherman Minton Bridge crossing the Ohio River into Indiana on I-64, and one approaching the Kennedy Bridge on I-65 towards Indiana. The Transportation Cabinet is now authorized to raise any multilane, divided rural highway up to 65 MPH based on speed and design studies. Anyone may request an increase by contacting their local Transportation Cabinet office and specifying the roadway to be raised. Two-lane, undivided highways are limited to 55 mph. Points are not assessed for speeds less than 10 mph over the speed limit only on limited access highways, or for tickets received by Kentucky licensed drivers out of state.

== Louisiana ==
Louisiana's highest speed limit is 75 mph, found on 154 miles of Interstate 49 in Saint Landry, Avoyelles, Evangeline, Rapides, Natchitoches, DeSoto and Caddo parishes. The Caddo Parish 75 zone is split into two portions, from the DeSoto-Caddo Parish line to Louisiana Highway 526, and from Louisiana Highway 1 to the Arkansas state line. The 75 zone was established by the Louisiana Department of Transportation and Development in 2011 after a 2010 bill authorized the DOTD to implement 75 zones where proven to be safe.

Interstates 10, 12, 20, 49, 55, 59, 220, and 310 have a 70 mph limit.

A speed limit of 60 mph is posted on I-10 in Lake Charles, Baton Rouge, and from LaPlace to New Orleans, I-12 in Baton Rouge, I-20 in Shreveport and Monroe, I-49 in Alexandria and Shreveport, I-220 in Shreveport, US 71 and US 167 in Kingsville, LA 3132, and I-110, I-210, I-510, I-610, and I-910 (note: part of I-10 in Baton Rouge was raised to 70 mph, and part of I-12 in Baton Rouge was also raised to 65 mph).

Most two-lane highways in Louisiana have a maximum speed limit of 55 mph.

In August 2003, Governor Mike Foster announced speed and lane restrictions on trucks on the 18 miles (29 km) stretch of I-10 known as the Atchafalaya Swamp Freeway. The restrictions lower the truck speed limit to 55 mph and restrict them to the right lane for the entire length of the elevated freeway.

=== Other laws ===
There are exceptions to the basic highway and speed laws

Divided highways in rural areas have a 65 mph speed limits. Louisiana law R.S. 32:61(B) & 32:62(A) states;

65 mph on other multi-lane divided highways which have partial or no control of access.

Louisiana operates under the reasonable and prudent basic law;

No person shall drive a vehicle at a speed greater than is reasonable and prudent under the conditions and potential hazards then existing, having due regard for the traffic on, and the surface and width of, the highway, and the condition of the weather. R.S. 32:64(A)

A person, who is operating a motor vehicle on a multilane highway at less than the normal speed of traffic, shall drive in the right-hand lane then available for traffic. R.S. 32:71(B)(1)

== Maine ==
Maine carries the highest speed limit on the East Coast, with Interstate 95 carrying a 75 mph (121 km/h) limit between Old Town and Houlton. Sections of I-95 south of Old Town as well as half of I-295 carry 70 mph (113 km/h) limits, except for brief 50 to 65 mph (80–105 km/h) zones in more populated areas. The Saco stub I-195 is 60 mph (97 km/h), and I-395 is 60 mph (97 km/h) in Bangor and 65 mph (105 km/h) in Brewer.

Default speed limits in Maine are:

- 15 mph (24 km/h) in a school zone within 30 minutes of the beginning or end of the school day or whenever/wherever children are present
- 20 mph (32 km/h) near an intersection "when the operator's view is obstructed", unless right-of-way is given via signage
- 25 mph (40 km/h) in business or residential districts, or other built-up areas
- 30 mph (48 km/h) on county roads
- 45 mph (72 km/h) on other roads

In Maine, school buses may not exceed 45 mph (72 km/h) on roads with higher speed limits while transporting students. At other times, the limit is 55 mph (89 km/h), unless on an Interstate highway, in which case the posted limit applies.

Fines for speeding are at least $50 by law. Exceeding the speed limit by 30 mph (48 km/h) or more is considered a criminal offense.

== Maryland ==
The speed limit on Maryland's Interstate Highways are posted by default at 65 mph although 70 mph limits can be posted after a traffic and engineering study. Effective October 1, 2015, the speed limit on I-68 is 70 mph except for a seven-mile section around Cumberland. Effective April 4, 2016, the speed limit on I-70 has been increased to 70 mph from the Pennsylvania state line to MD 180 in Frederick County and from MD 144 in Frederick County to US 29 in Howard County. Maryland's urban freeways normally have speed limits of 55 mph (like I-495) or 60 mph, although some stretches are signed for 65 mph travel such as portions of I-95 and I-97 in and around the Baltimore suburbs, I-70 around Frederick, and I-81 around Hagerstown. I-70 around Hagerstown is posted at 70 mph. More restrictive limits are found on I-83 south of North Avenue when approaching downtown Baltimore and on I-68 through Cumberland, both sections being marked at 40 mph.

Four lane non-interstates and non-freeways are posted at 55 mph. This includes the expressway grade roadways like US 50 and US 301 east of the Bay Bridge, US 15 north of Frederick to the Pennsylvania state line, MD 404 around Denton and US 29 between I-495 and I-70. However, the Salisbury Bypass on the Eastern Shore and US 340 from Brunswick to I-70 in Frederick are posted at 65 mph.

Two lane roads are generally posted at 50 mph but there are a handful of routes posted at 55 mph. It is more common to see 55 mph on the Eastern Shore and in Frederick and Carroll counties than the Baltimore-Washington corridor and Western Maryland. Two lane routes that have a speed limit of 55 mph enforce mandatory headlight use.

Urban and downtown speed limits are generally posted at 30 mph.

== Massachusetts ==
As prescribed by Massachusetts law, default speed limits are the following:

- 15 mph (24 km/h) in the area of a vehicle (for example, an ice cream truck) that is selling merchandise and is displaying flashing amber lights
- 20 mph (32 km/h) in a school zone when children are present
- 30 mph (48 km/h) on a road in a "thickly settled" or business district for at least 1/8 mile (200 m)
- 40 mph (64 km/h) on a road outside of a "thickly settled" or business district for at least 1/4 mile (400 m)
- 50 mph (80 km/h) on a divided highway outside of a "thickly settled" or business district for at least 1/4 mile (400 m)

State highways and other arterials are often posted at 35 to 40 mph (56–64 km/h) in urban areas and 45 to 50 mph (72–80 km/h) in rural areas. A select number of undivided roads are posted at 55 mph (89 km/h). Divided highways are usually posted at 45 to 55 mph (72–89 km/h) in rural areas as well as business districts. Interstate highways and some non-Interstate freeways in suburban and rural areas are posted at 65 mph (105 km/h), but many non-Interstate highways are posted at 55 mph (89 km/h) such as US 6, Route 2, and Route 128, or 60 mph (97 km/h), such as Massachusetts Route 3 South of Boston, or 65 mph (105 km/h), such as the freeway portion of US 3. Urban freeways are often posted at 55 mph (89 km/h) and occasionally lower, but some rural freeways that pass through urban areas maintain their 65 mph (105 km/h) speed limit, such as the Massachusetts Turnpike through the Springfield and Worcester areas.

A "thickly settled district" is an area where building structures such as residential and commercial are less than 200 feet (61 m) apart for a distance of 1 mile (1.6 km) or more. This can be subjective since a large part of eastern Massachusetts is built up with many different jurisdictions and different speed limits assigned.

== Michigan ==
The maximum speed limit in Michigan is 75 mph (121 km/h). Michigan uses a formula based on the number of driveways and streets, or on the 85th percentile of free-flowing traffic, and if none those methods are used a 55 mph (89 km/h) default applies. In rural areas, speed limits are as follows:

- Freeway speeds for passenger vehicles range from 70 mph (113 km/h) to 75 mph (121 km/h).
- Freeway speeds for trucks and military vehicles is 65 mph (105 km/h).
- Non-freeway speeds for passenger vehicles and trucks range from 55 mph (89 km/h) to 65 mph (105 km/h).

Freeways in Michigan are usually signed with both minimum and maximum speeds. By default, the freeway speed limit is 70 mph (113 km/h), with a minimum speed of 55 mph (89 km/h) for all vehicles, despite a truck speed limit of 65 mph (105 km/h)—effectively permitting trucks only a 10 mph (16 km/h) range of legal speeds. The Mackinac Bridge has a speed limit of 45 mph (72 km/h) for passenger vehicles and 20 mph (32 km/h) for trucks, but can be as low as 20 mph (32 km/h) during high winds. The Michigan Department of Transportation and the Michigan State Police may raise the speed limit to 75 mph (121 km/h) after it is deemed safe to do so. MDOT and the MSP announced on April 26, 2017, that the speed limit was increased to 75 mph on several Michigan freeways, including I-75 from Bay City to Sault Ste. Marie (excluding the Mackinac Bridge), I-69 from Business Loop 69 in Clinton County to I-94 in St. Clair County (excluding the section in and around Flint, which remains at 70 mph (113 km/h)), US 127 from I-69 in Clinton County to I-75 in Crawford County (excluding the 15-mile stretch between St. Johns and Ithaca, which is not freeway standard), and US 131 from M-57 in Kent County to the end of the freeway north of Manton. These increases commenced on May 1, 2017, and were completed by May 15, 2017. Speed limits in freeway work zones are statutorily limited to 60 mph (97 km/h) 24 hours per day. If workers are present (and not behind a barrier wall), drivers must slow to 45 mph (72 km/h) for the workers' safety.

For many years, trucks generally had a speed limit of 60 mph (97 km/h), but this was increased to 65 mph (105 km/h) in 2017.

Michigan's speed limits on urban Interstates are typically higher than its adjacent states. For example, in the Detroit metro area, I-75 southbound enters Detroit at M-102 (8 Mile Road, exit 59) and maintains a 70 mph (113 km/h) limit all the way until the interchange with I-94 (exit 53), where the speed limit drops to 55 mph (89 km/h). Other freeways in Detroit such as I-94 and I-96 also have 55 mph (89 km/h) speed limits in and around the city's downtown area, but rise to 70 mph (113 km/h) relatively soon after leaving the downtown area. In Downtown Grand Rapids, I-196 has a speed limit of 65 mph (105 km/h), the only other urban Interstate Highway to have a reduced speed limit. US 131 in Grand Rapids is one of the only non-Interstate urban freeways in Michigan with a 70 miles per hour (113 km/h) speed limit, which was raised from 55 miles per hour (89 km/h) in 2013. Furthermore, speed limits in smaller cities, including Ann Arbor, Battle Creek, Flint, Kalamazoo, Lansing (the state capital), and Saginaw remain at 70 mph (113 km/h).

The default speed on all other highways, whether two or four lanes, is 55 mph (89 km/h). However, Michigan permits speed limits of up to 65 mph (105 km/h) after a safety study concludes the higher limit is safe to implement. Until 2016, this provision only applied to four-lane divided non-limited access highways. A 20-mile (32 km) stretch of US 127 between St. Johns and Ithaca was posted at 65 mph (105 km/h), as a compromise to allow a freer flow of traffic due to insufficient funds to improve the section to freeway standards. The speed limit on US 2 between Rapid River and Gladstone in the Upper Peninsula was also raised to 65 mph (105 km/h). In 2017 speed limits began increasing to 65 mph on several select two-lane roads in both the Lower and Upper Peninsulas of Michigan, including US 2 from St. Ignace to Rapid River and M-28 from I-75 to Munising.

== Midway Atoll ==
The speed limit in Midway Atoll is 15 mph (24 km/h).

== Minnesota ==
Urban speeds are set, by default, to 30 mph (48 km/h). As of August 2019, cities have been allowed to set speed limits on city-owned streets without the Minnesota Department of Transportation (MnDOT) conducting a speed study, though the law does require the city to conduct its own, independent engineering review. Cities may also adopt a speed limit of 25 mph (40 km/h) on a residential road without any form of study needed. To date, Minneapolis and Saint Paul have both adopted a citywide 20 mph (32 km/h) speed limit unless otherwise posted, though most major city streets are posted at 25 mph (40 km/h).

A 70 mph (113 km/h) speed limit is only allowed on Minnesota's Interstates outside of urban areas. A speed limit of 55 mph (89 km/h) is typically used in urban areas where a higher speed limit might be used, but traffic congestion or other reasons require a lower speed limit. Examples include I-94, I-35W and I-35E in and around Minneapolis, Moorhead and Saint Paul. I-35E goes down to a speed limit of 45 mph (72 km/h) in some areas of Saint Paul. A speed limit of 60 mph (97 km/h) is typically used in suburban areas such as I-494 and I-694 loops in the Twin Cities metro area.

Non-Interstate divided highways (both freeways and expressways) have speed limits of 65 mph (105 km/h) in rural areas and up to 60 mph (97 km/h) in urban or suburban areas (Note: some non-Interstate divided highways have gotten speed limit increases in November 2017 such as US 169 in the Twin Cities metro area). Rural roads in Minnesota have limits of 55 mph (89 km/h) unless otherwise posted, although many 60 mph (97 km/h) speed limits are in place after a traffic and engineering study from 2014 to 2019.

== Mississippi ==
A speed limit of 70 mph is only allowed on Mississippi's rural freeways; only the Interstates (except I-110), US 78, Mississippi Highway 304 (MS 304), and a portion of US 82 have speed limits of 70 mph, with these lengths making up approximately 86% of the state's freeway mileage.

A speed limit of 65 mph is typically used on the state's four-lane divided highways, which include parts of the following roadways:

- U.S. Route 45 / U.S. Route 45 Alternate
- U.S. Route 49 / U.S. Route 49W
- U.S. Route 61
- U.S. Route 72
- U.S. Route 82
- U.S. Route 84
- U.S. Route 90
- U.S. Route 98
- U.S. Route 278
- MS 15
- MS 19
- MS 25
- MS 39
- MS 57
- MS 63
- MS 67
- MS 302
- MS 605
- MS 607

A speed limit of 60 mph is typically used in urban areas where a higher speed limit might be used, but traffic or geometric conditions constitute a lower speed limit, including the following areas:

- Interstate 20 in Vicksburg, from Jackson to Pearl, and Meridian
- Interstate 55 from Jackson to Ridgeland
- Interstate 59 in Laurel and Meridian
- U.S. Route 61 in Tunica Resorts
- U.S. Route 78 in New Albany
- U.S. Route 82 in Columbus

House Bill 3, passed during the 2008 First Extraordinary Session of the state legislature, permits speed limits up to 80 mph (129 km/h) on toll roads in the state; however, as of 2025, no such road has been constructed. Mississippi has a minimum speed of 30 mph on four-lane U.S. Highways when no hazard exists. Strangely, there is no law for the minimum speed of the state's growing number of four-lane state highways. The minimum is 40 mph on Interstate Highways and on four-lane U.S. Highways that have a 70 mph speed limit. In 2004, Mississippi posted minimum speed limits (40 mph) on all rural Interstates, but this minimum speed limit was already state law before then.

== Missouri ==
Statutory speed limits in Missouri are as follows:

- Interstate highways and freeways in rural areas: 75 mph. On October 22, 2026 MoDOT stated the speed limit will be increased to 75 mph on portions of I-29, I-35, I-49 and I-55.
  - On I-29, the limit will increase on a 64-mile (103 km) section from exit 56 to approximately two miles (3.2 km) south of the Iowa border.
  - On I-35 the limit will increase on a 55-mile (89 km) section from Cameron to four miles (6.4 km) south of the Iowa border.
  - On I-49, a 24-mile (39 km) section from the Arkansas border to exit 24 and a 45-mile (72 km) section from exit 56 to just south of exit 101.
  - Four sections of I-55 totaling 137 miles (220 km) will be increased. The sections are a 17-mile (27 km) section from the Arkansas border to just south of the I-155 interchange, a 45-mile (72 km) section from milepost 19.8 to just south of the I-57 exit, a 16-mile (26 km) section from milepost 70.5 to milepost 86.6 and a 59-mile (95 km) section from north of exit 105 to the Jefferson County line. The increases will take effect as soon as the new signs are posted.
- Expressways in rural areas: 65 mph (notable exceptions being the US 54 & US 63 Expressways to the north of Jefferson City, which are at-grade expressways with a 70 mph speed limit)
- Interstates, freeways, and expressways in urban areas: 60 mph
- Other numbered state-maintained rural highways: 60 mph
- State gravel roads: 35 mph

Freeways are defined as: "a limited access divided highway of at least ten miles in length with four or more lanes which is not part of the federal interstate system of highways which does not have any crossovers or accesses from streets, roads or other highways at the same grade level as such divided highway within such ten miles of divided highway."

Expressways are defined as: "a divided highway of at least ten miles in length with four or more lanes which is not part of the federal interstate system of highways which has crossovers or accesses from streets, roads or other highways at the same grade level as such divided highway."

Urban Areas are defined as: "an area of fifty thousand population at a density at or greater than one thousand persons per square mile".

The highways and transportation commission may raise or lower the speed limit on these highways, but no speed limit may be set above 75 mph on a numbered highway (effective August 28, 2026) and 60 mph on a lettered highway.

Interstate highways have minimum speed limits of 40 mph.

=== Variable speed limits ===
Missouri concluded a two-year experiment with variable speed limits along I-270 around St. Louis. Digital signs had been erected along the freeway as well as additional signs alerting drivers about the use of variable speed limits. The limits will vary between 40 and 60 mph, depending on traffic conditions, and could change by up to 5 mph every 5 minutes. These speed limits, as of January 2012, are now posted as "Advisory Speed Limits".

During the closure and major rebuild of I-64 in St. Louis, an additional lane was added to I-44 and I-70, and the speed limit was thus reduced to 55 mph on those roads within the St. Louis County and City. The I-64 construction has been completed, and the extra lanes were removed in 2010. In October 2010, the speed limit was restored to 60 mph on both I-44 and I-70.

=== Exceptions to the statutory limits ===
Most two-lane roads with shoulders have a 60 mph speed limit in Missouri. Two-lane roads without shoulders are usually, but not always, limited to 55 mph. Some improved two-lane highways have a 65 mph speed limit in rural areas, such as:

- US-54 from El Dorado Springs west to the Kansas state line; from the MO-73 intersection southwest of Macks Creek to near Camdenton; and also along the three-mile-long Mexico bypass.
- US-63 from Vienna south to Thayer, near the Arkansas state line. Some of this route has three lanes, with the passing lane alternating between northbound and southbound traffic.
- MO-5 between Camdenton and Lebanon. This road has three lanes, with the passing lane alternating between northbound and southbound traffic.
- MO-43 from US-54 south to Seneca
- MO-96 from I-44 west to Carthage

Most rural expressways have a 65 mph speed limit, however some have an upgraded speed limit of 70 mph

- US-54 from the south end of the Mexico bypass to the Route W interchange just across the Missouri River from Jefferson City, with the exception of the I-70 interchange area at Kingdom City, which is 45 mph. US-54 also has a 70 mph speed limit from Fall Hill Road in Cole County to just north of the Business Route 54 intersection in Lake Ozark.
- US-63 from the south end of the Kirksville bypass to US-54 north of Jefferson City, with the exception of the sections through Macon, where US 63 follows undivided surface streets through the city, and Columbia, where the speed limit drops to 65 mph.
- MO-7 from I-49 to just west of Clinton.
- The James River Freeway from I-44 to Route 13 west of Springfield is built to full Interstate Highway Standards, and has a 70 mph speed limit. The speed limit drops to 60 mph through Springfield itself, similar to other urban Interstate highways in Missouri.
- The US-71 expressway from Pineville to Harrisonville had a 70 mph limit before it was upgraded to I-49.

Most Missouri lettered highways are 55 mph, and in densely populated areas they can be less. There are several that have a speed limit of 60 mph, including the following:

- Route M in Jefferson County is an expressway for most of its length, and most of the highway has a speed limit of 60 mph.
- Route A in Jefferson County, an upgraded two lane road with shoulders, has a 60 mph speed limit. Route A travels between Hillsboro and Festus.
- Route B in Boone County is mostly an upgraded two lane road with shoulders. As such, it has a 60 mph speed limit from just north of Columbia to the end of the upgraded section 1 mile south of Hallsville. North of Hallsville, the highway becomes Route 124, which also has a 60 mph speed limit.
- Route C in Cole County is an upgraded two-lane highway with shoulders, and has a 60 mph speed limit from just west of Jefferson City to just east of Russellville.
- Route A in Osage County follows the former routing of US Route 50 from its intersection with modern-day US 50 to Loose Creek. Since the roadway is designed to the same standards as a major highway, the speed limit is 60 mph on that stretch of road.

In the urban areas of St. Louis, Kansas City, Columbia, St. Joseph, and Springfield, the speed limit typically drops to 60 mph on Interstates and freeways. In addition, on I-44 in Rolla the speed limit is reduced to 60 mph from just west of Exit 184 to Exit 186 because of a substandard design.

Freeway speed limits in urban areas can be as low as 45 or 50 mph in a few very short sections in downtown Kansas City and St. Louis, or as high as 65 mph in the outer portions of the St. Louis, Kansas City and St. Joseph areas. The Cape Girardeau and Joplin areas have no reduced freeway speed limits, and I-435 around Kansas City has a 70 mph limit from I-35 in Claycomo to the Kansas State Line around the northern and western part of the metro area.

I-29 in Kansas City has a limit of 70 mph north of Barry Road in Platte County to south of Highway 169 in Buchanan County where the limit drops to 65 mph. North of Frederick Road in Buchanan County the limit returns to 70 mph until the Iowa state line.

On July 13, 2026, Governor Kehoe signed SB1408 into law. This bill permits speeds up to 75 mph on rural freeways.

== Montana ==
As of October 1, 2015, the maximum speed limit in Montana is 80 mph (129 km/h). On May 5, 2015, a bill to increase Montana's rural interstate highway speed limit from 75 to 80 mph was signed into law by Governor Steve Bullock.

=== Reasonable and prudent ===
Typical speed limit sign that one would see at the Montana state line from December 1995 to June 1999

In the years before the 1974 national 55 mph limit, and for three years after the 1995 repeal of the increased 65 mph limit, Montana had a non-numeric "reasonable and prudent" speed limit during the daytime on most rural roads. Montana Code Annotated (MCA) Section 61-8-303 said "A person ... shall drive the vehicle ... at a rate of speed no greater than is reasonable and prudent under the conditions existing at the point of operation ... so as not to unduly or unreasonably endanger the life, limb, property, or other rights of a person entitled to the use of the street or highway."

Montana law also specified a few numeric limits: a night speed limit, usually 55 or 65 mph (89 or 105 km/h), depending on road type; 25 mph (40 km/h) in urban districts and 35 mph (56 km/h) in construction zones.

The phrase "reasonable and prudent" is found in the language of most state speed laws. This allows prosecution under non-ideal conditions such as rain or snow when the speed limit would be imprudently fast.

=== No speed limit ===
On March 10, 1996, a Montana patrolman issued a speeding ticket to a driver traveling at 85 mph (137 km/h) on a stretch of State Highway 200. The 50‑year‑old driver (Rudy Stanko) was operating a 1996 Chevrolet Camaro with less than 10,000 miles (16,000 km) on the odometer. Although the officer gave no opinion as to what would have been a reasonable speed, the driver was convicted. The driver appealed to the Montana Supreme Court. The Court reversed the conviction in case No. 97–486 on December 23, 1998; it held that a law requiring drivers to drive at a non-numerical "reasonable and prudent" speed "is so vague that it violates the Due Process Clause ... of the Montana Constitution".

Effective May 28, 1999, as a result of that decision, the Montana Legislature established a speed limit of 75 mph (121 km/h).

- Montana's US, State, and even Secondary roads have speed limits posted 70 mph/night:65; truck:60/night:55.

Seven years later, a research study conducted by the Insurance Institute for Highway Safety, a long-time advocate of the federal National Maximum Speed Law, showed Montana's 75 mph speed limit on rural Interstates was well received by motorists; traffic speed measurements taken by IIHS showed 76 percent of cars in compliance with 75 mph on those roads. IIHS also found large trucks subject to Montana's unchanged 65 mph speed limit for large trucks on rural Interstates slowed down dramatically, from a mean speed of 70 mph in 1996 to 65 mph in 2006, with the 85th percentile large truck speed dropping 11 mph, from 79 mph in 1996 to 68 mph in 2006.

=== 75 and 80 mph speed limits ===
Despite this reversal, Montana's then-governor, Marc Racicot, did not convene an emergency session of the legislature. Certain roads technically had no speed limit whatsoever until June 1999, after the Montana legislature met in regular session and enacted a new law. The law's practical effect was to require numeric speed limits on all roads and disallow any speed limit higher than 75 mph (121 km/h).

Montana law still contains a section that says "a person shall operate a vehicle in a careful and prudent manner and at a reduced rate of speed no greater than is reasonable and prudent under the conditions existing at the point of operation, taking into account the amount and character of traffic, visibility, weather, and roadway conditions." However, this is a standard clause that appears in other state traffic codes and has the practical effect of requiring a speed lower than the speed limit where a lower speed is necessary to maintain a reasonable and prudent road manner.

Montana also has limited sections of night speed limits. Other speed limits in Montana are 15–35 mph (24–56 km/h) in a school zone, 30 mph (48 km/h) in a residential district, 35–45 mph (56–72 km/h) on boulevards, 55 mph (89 km/h) on traffic-light highways, 65–75 mph (105–121 km/h) on rural divided 4-lane highways, and 55–70 mph (89–113 km/h) on rural 2-lane undivided highways.

On May 10, 2019, Governor Steve Bullock signed HB 393 into law. This law raises the truck speed limit to 70 mph (113 km/h) at all times on rural freeways and 65 mph (105 km/h) at all times on other rural highways.

In 2025, the default daytime speed limit was increased from 70 mph (110 km/h) to 75 mph (121 km/h) on specified four-lane divided highways. To qualify for the increased default limit, the corridor must be at least 10 mi (16 km) in length and not already be subject to a different speed limit.

== Nebraska ==
The maximum speed limit in Nebraska is 75 mph on rural Interstate highways. This speed limit only applies to Interstate 80 between Omaha and Lincoln, and west of Lincoln to the Wyoming state line, as well as the small section of Interstate 76 that enters the southwestern corner of the state from Colorado to join I-80. Freeways and expressways in urban areas are posted at 65 mph. The speed limit in rural areas of Nebraska is 65 mph unless otherwise posted, although rural divided highways and Super two highways are posted at 70 mph. The most recent change to Nebraska's speed limits was enacted on April 17, 2018, which resulted in all maximum speed limits in the state (except those for rural Interstate highways) being raised by five miles per hour.

== Nevada ==
The maximum speed limits in Nevada are 70–80 mph (113–129 km/h) on rural freeways, 65–75 mph (105–121 km/h) on other rural divided highways, 55–70 mph (89–113 km/h) on primary undivided roads, and 65 mph (105 km/h) on urban freeways.

- I-15 is posted at 70 mph (113 km/h) south of Las Vegas to match California's 70 mph posted limit, and 75 mph (121 km/h) northeast of Las Vegas (north of milepost 52).
- US 95 north of Las Vegas is 70 mph (113 km/h). From south of US 93 near Boulder City south to SR 163, it is 75 mph (121 km/h).
- I-80 from Reno, Nevada to Utah varies from 65–80 mph (105–129 km/h). Most rural sections are posted at 75 mph (121 km/h). The sections east of Oasis to the Utah Border and between Fernley and Winnemucca are 80 mph (129 km/h) as of 2018 except the portion in Lovelock. Mountainous sections and those laid through narrow valleys are usually 70 mph (113 km/h). West of Reno, I-80 is posted at 65 mph (105 km/h) as it quickly transitions from suburban Reno to crossing the Sierra Nevada into California, where the limit is also 65 mph.
- US 50 from Lake Tahoe to Ely and Utah is 70 mph (113 km/h).
- I-580 from exit 10 to just south of exit 24 is 70 mph (113 km/h) after which it is 65 mph (105 km/h).
- US 95, I-15, and I-215 through downtown Las Vegas are all posted at 65 mph (105 km/h).

Prior to the imposition of the 50 and 55 mph (80 and 89 km/h) speed limit in late 1973, Nevada also had a "reasonable and prudent" speed Limit (non-numeric) on most of its rural highways, both freeway and others. The speed limit on certain two-lane highways is 70 mph including US 95 to the Oregon border (where the speed limit is 65 mph for trucks) and on certain sections of US 6 and 50 in the Nevada desert. Speed limits are 15 to 25 mph in school zones and 25 to 30 mph in residential districts. In 2015, the Nevada State Legislature voted to increase the statewide maximum speed limit to 80 mph to take effect in October of that year. However, between October 2015 and March 2017, no 80 mph speed limits were posted in the state.

On March 13, 2017, the Nevada DOT installed 80 mph speed limit signs on the 130-mile stretch of I-80 between Fernley and Winnemucca, excluding the Lovelock (exits 106 and 107) area.

On February 21, 2018, the Nevada DOT increased the speed limit on I-80 to 80 mph between Oasis and West Wendover.

In December 2018, the Nevada DOT increased the speed limit on more sections of I-80 to 80 mph. The sections are from Winnemucca to Battle Mountain and from Elko to Wells.

== New Hampshire ==
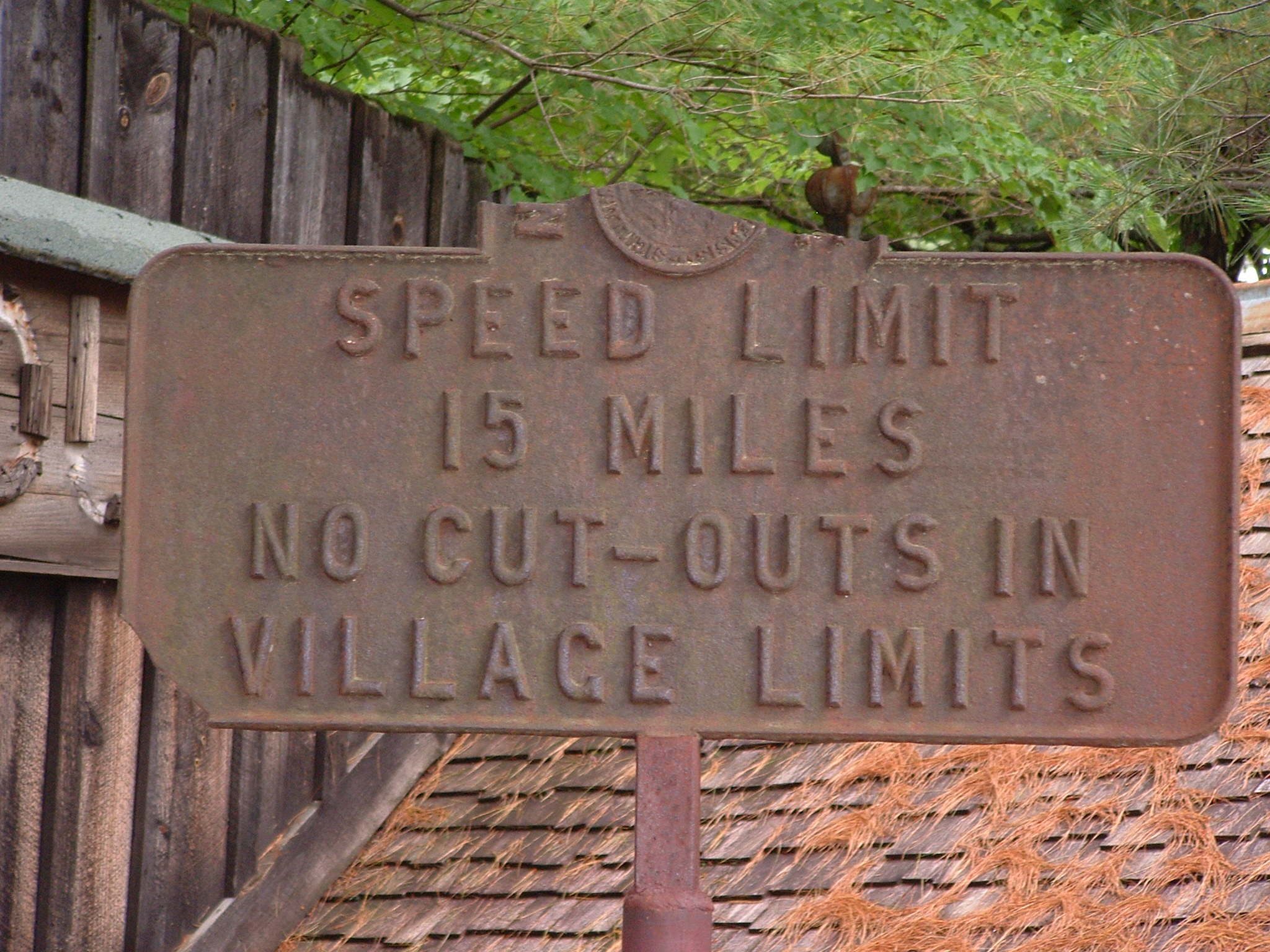
Antique New Hampshire speed limit sign

The highest speed limit in New Hampshire is 70 mph (113 km/h). It can be found on Interstate 93 from mile marker 45 to the Vermont border (excluding the Franconia Notch Parkway). All other freeways and turnpikes have a maximum of 65 mph (105 km/h). The minimum speed on Interstate Highways in New Hampshire is 45 mph (72 km/h) where posted.

Provided that no hazard exists that requires lower speed, the speed of any vehicle not in excess of the limit is deemed to be prima facie lawful. The limit for "rural residential districts" and Class V highways outside the city or town compact is 35 mph (56 km/h). The limit for any "business or urban residence district" is 30 mph (48 km/h). School zones receive a 10 mph (16 km/h) reduction in the limit 45 minutes before and after the beginning and end of a school day. The speed limit for a road work or construction area is 10 mph (16 km/h) lower than the normal speed limit, but not more than 45 mph (72 km/h), when work is in progress. The speed limit for all other locations is 55 mph (89 km/h). The minimum limit that a speed can be set in a rural or urban district is 25 mph (40 km/h).

The speed limit on Interstate 93 through Franconia Notch State Park falls to 45 mph (72 km/h) where the highway narrows to one lane in each direction, but rises back to 70 mph (113 km/h) (in 10 mph (16 km/h) increments going south) once the highway leaves Franconia Notch. Interstate 393 in Concord has a 55 mph (89 km/h) posted speed limit for its entire length, with the exception of 45 and 35 mph (72 and 56 km/h) zones on the westbound portion closest to the city center and the end of the highway. Interstate 293's speed limit through downtown Manchester falls to 50 mph (80 km/h) as it runs along the Merrimack River, but increases to 55 mph (89 km/h) on either side of the city center.

Prior to 1974, the New Hampshire Turnpike, along with rural sections of Interstates 89 and 93, were posted at 70 mph (113 km/h).

== New Jersey ==
New Jersey's only statutory speed limits are:

- 50 mph rural
- 25 mph urban

Since the state is largely suburbanized, it ranges between 25 and 50 mph depending the jurisdiction of the road and whether the municipality is township, village, town, borough or city status. New Jersey increased their freeway speed limits to 65 mph in 1998 after the repeal of the National Maximum Speed Law. The only highways that are signed at 65 mph in New Jersey are:

Toll roads:

- New Jersey Turnpike (south of Linden)
- New Jersey Turnpike Pennsylvania Turnpike Extension (I-95)
- Garden State Parkway (except between Paramus and Old Bridge, and around Toms River)
- Atlantic City Expressway (west of the Garden State Parkway)

NJDOT maintained highways:

- I-295 (except in Pennsville, and between Bellmawr and Cherry Hill)
- I-80 (from the Delaware Water Gap to Wayne)
- I-287 (except in and around Morristown)
- I-78 (from the Delaware River to Newark)
- I-195
- Route 55
- Route 24
- Route 18 in Monmouth County

In all 65 mph speed zones, the fines for speeding and any other moving violations are doubled (that was the stipulation to increase the speed limit in the state). Signs informing drivers of this appear after most reassurance signs.

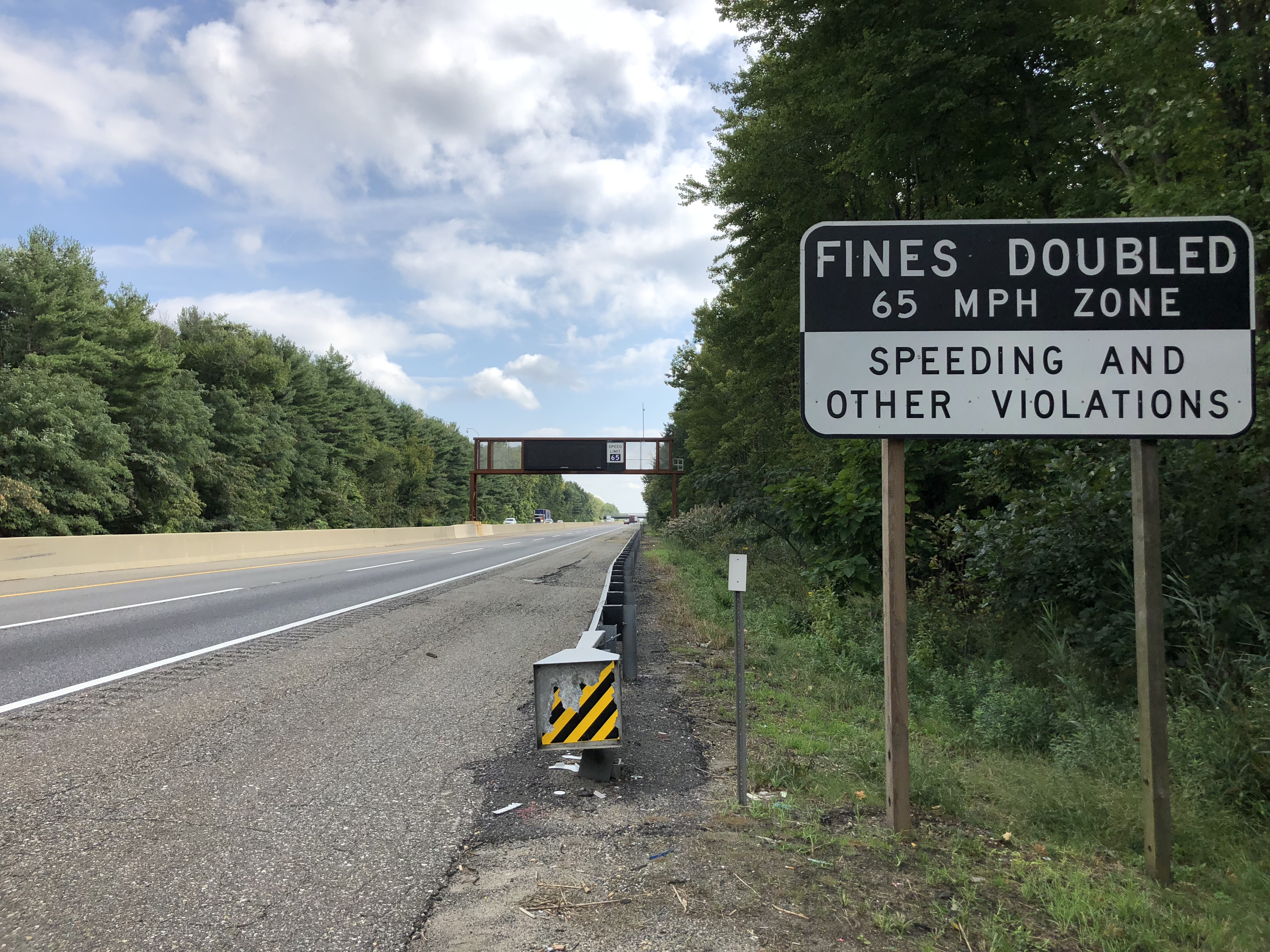
Typical signage found in 65 mph speed zones in New Jersey, informing drivers that traffic fines are doubled

Shorter length, and non-interstate freeways (such as US 202, Route 15, Route 90, Route 21, Route 42, Interstate 676, and Route 33) remain at 55 mph. Urban freeway speed limits are generally 50 to 55 mph. However, some freeways in urban areas retain a 65 mph speed limit. Only the New Jersey Turnpike system, including the Eastern and Western spurs, the Newark Extension (I-78), and the Pennsylvania Turnpike Extension (I-95) have variable speed limits along with variable message signs on their entire respective lengths.

As much of the state is incorporated, mostly every exurban, or rural two-lane surface road (whether state, or county maintained) is posted at 50 mph. The only two-lane surface roads posted at 55 mph in New Jersey are:

- County Route 539
- Route 70, and Route 72 in the Pine Barrens of Ocean and Burlington Counties
- Route 54 in Atlantic County.
- Route 33 Freehold Bypass (where it is a super two freeway)

Two-to-four lane or greater state highways (often with a jersey divider or grass median) are generally posted as high as 50 to 55 mph. County and municipal maintained roads in the state are not posted above 50 mph. School zones, business, or residential districts are usually posted at 25 mph. Certain low density business and residential districts are posted at 35 mph to 45 mph. However, there are a handful of 45 mph residential stretches (such as Terill Road in Scotch Plains and Woodbridge Avenue (CR 514) in Edison). All rural non posted, county-maintained roads have a speed limit of 50 mph, as per state law.

== New Mexico ==
Speed limits for all classes of roads and areas are set by statute in New Mexico, meaning that any changes to the state's speed limits would require a bill to pass both chambers of the Legislature and be signed into law by the Governor (or overridden by the Legislature in the event of a Governor's veto). With the exception of wartime, New Mexico had no default numeric speed limit until the early 1950s. Prior to the national 55 mph limit in 1974, the speed limit on rural Interstates was 75 mph during the day and 70 mph at night. Primary highways in open areas had daytime speed limits of 70 mph and nighttime ones of 60 mph. Secondary highways in open areas had daytime speed limits of 60 mph and nighttime ones of 50 mph. Before the end of federal speed controls, the maximum speed limit was 65 mph on Interstate routes and 55 mph elsewhere. In May 1996 legislation enacted by Governor Gary Johnson raised the absolute speed limit in New Mexico to 75 mph. Signs are posted on the vast majority of the mileage of Interstate routes to that effect. The default speed limit for any road where no speed limit is posted is 55 mph.

New Mexico has six major freeway facilities, which include three lengthy Interstate routes. Part of US-70 (as a divided highway) between Las Cruces and Alamogordo is one of only three sections of non-Interstate route as well as being the first road in New Mexico that's not a freeway to have the 75 mph limit; US Route 54 from Chaparral to Boles Acres, and, as of January 2019, US 285 between Roswell and Vaughn were both raised to 75 mph as well. Montana (US Route 287 from I-90 to Townsend as of November 2025), New Mexico, Nevada (US 95 south of US 93), and Texas are the only four states with 75 mph limits on roads that aren't freeways. There is no statutory requirement for reduced speeds on urban freeways so that, for example at Santa Fe and Las Vegas the speed limit remains 75 mph on I-25. New Mexico, Kansas, North Dakota, Colorado, and Texas are the only states to have a speed limit greater than 70 mph in urban highways. Nonetheless, there are 65 mph limits on freeways in more heavily urbanized areas such as Albuquerque and Las Cruces. Other reduced speed limits do exist, but the lowest speed limit under normal conditions on New Mexico's freeways is 55 mph, which can be found on two sections of Interstate 25: The first section being three miles from the Big I to Gibson Boulevard in Albuquerque, and the second being a short stretch near Raton Pass. These particular stretches of I-25 were originally built as relocations of US-85, whose design and construction predate the interstate highway era. As such, these stretches do not meet modern interstate highway standards, and have closely spaced interchanges, sharp curves, and/or limited sight distances.

By statute, other state maintained roads may have speed limits of up to 75 mph. Four-lane divided highways in open areas often have 65 mph limits, with some 70 mph limits, such as almost the entire length of US 550 from Bloomfield to Bernalillo, and a 23-mile stretch of US 70 west of Roswell.

Primary two-lane highways in open areas with parking shoulders often have 65 mph limits.

Most primary two-lane highways without parking shoulders in open and mixed rural areas still have a 55 mph limit, but some have 60 mph limits.

A 65 mph left lane minimum speed limit is sometimes indicated on 75 mph roads with steep grades, "slower traffic keep right" is also in effect. On one-way roadways, state law reserves the left and center lanes of two or more lanes for passing. There are reduced advisory speed limits for some roads during poor weather. Speeding fines are doubled in construction zones and designated safety corridors, with signs often stating this. There are no longer night speed limits, nor are there any differential speed limits for heavy trucks.

There are two other statutory speed limits in New Mexico that are often altered, especially on urban arterials or even city or countywide: 15 mph in a "business or residence district" and 15 mph near schools at certain times. For example, in Albuquerque the default speed limit is 30 mph as per state law, but many streets have a different speed limit. Some school zones there have 20 mph speed limits. The city of Santa Fe's default speed limit is 25 mph. Although there are no signs to make drivers aware of the altered limit, the limit is signed on most roads where it applies. Los Alamos County alters the urban default and absolute speed limits to 25 mph and 50 mph respectively, but posts signs at county lines.

- The speed limit on NM 502 between San Ildefonso Pueblo and Pojoaque Valley High School had a 65-mph speed limit. In November 2005, the stretch between NM-4 and Pojoaque became a safety corridor. In 2007, the speed limit on the San Ildefonso-Pojoaque stretch was lowered to 55 mph.
- On Highway 68, the speed limit is 60 mph on much of the four-lane stretch between Española and Velarde.
- Minimum 65 left lane signs are posted on I-40 west of Albuquerque, a night speed limit of 30 mph is posted on State Highway 7 west of White's City going into Carlsbad Caverns.
- Truck speed limit signs are rarely posted. One road has a posted limit of 45 mph/trucks:35 in Escondida, just north of Socorro, and US 82 east of Alamogordo has a posted limit of 55 mph/trucks:50 for approximately a two-mile stretch.
- As of December 24, 2009, US 54 still has a 55 mph speed limit north of Tularosa. Yet NM-9 and CR-A003 have a 65 mph speed limit east of Columbus to NM 136 near Santa Teresa. CR-A003 (Columbus-Santa Teresa Highway) is the only county road in New Mexico to exceed the statutory maximum 55 mph speed limit for county roads.
- Interstate 10 was 70 mph between the Texas-New Mexico state line and two miles south of I-25 in Las Cruces until October 2012, when it was raised to 75 mph. While it is 75 mph in the rest of New Mexico, the speed limit is 65 mph in Las Cruces, Deming, and Lordsburg.
- I-25 was posted 70 mph in Sandoval County from the Bernalillo-Sandoval county line to US 550, but the limit was raised to 75 mph in May 2014.
- State Highway 30, a paved two-lane road with shoulders, has a 55 mph speed limit from NM 502 to the junction with the road for Santa Clara Pueblo, then reduces to 45 mph and then to 40 mph upon entering the Española city limits. Prior to 2008 the speed limits were 60 mph from NM 502 until the junction with the road for Santa Clara Pueblo where it reduced to 45 mph, raised back to 60 mph until the Española city limits where it reduced to 50 mph, and then to 40 mph near its northern terminus at US 84/285.
- US 84/285 between Santa Fe and Pojoaque, before it was upgraded to a freeway, had a 45 mph limit from Guadalupe Road in Santa Fe to the interchange with NM 599, increased to 55 mph to the southern terminus of Santa Fe County Road 73, increased to 60 mph until entering Cuyamungue, decreased to 55 mph, and then to 45 mph upon entering Pojoaque. Since it was upgraded to a full freeway in 2005, the speed limit from Guadalupe Road to NM 599 is now 55 mph, increases to 65 mph until Pojoaque where it briefly reduces to 50 mph and then to 45 mph.
- The posted speed limit on Silver Avenue in Albuquerque is 18 mph. When the route was designated as a bicycle route in the late 2000s, Albuquerque officials established the unusual 18 mph speed limit on Silver Avenue to increase motorists' awareness of the street's designation as a city bicycle route.

Most of US 285 (non freeway) between Vaughn and Roswell is posted at 75 mph (as of December 2018.)

Outside of Bernalillo County, no points are assessed to one's license for speeding in rural areas in New Mexico, unless the excessive speed was a contributing factor to a traffic accident.

== New York ==
A standard-style New York State speed sign indicating the state speed limit

Speed limits are statutory (set by law) or regulatory (enacted by regulation), not necessarily by engineering standards. New York has a blanket statutory "Reasonable and Prudent" speed law.

The highest posted speed limit in New York is 65 mph (105 km/h), found only on limited-access freeways (including some state highways, most of the New York State Thruway and select Interstate Highways). The default speed limit, posted as the "State Speed Limit", is 55 mph, which is in effect unless otherwise posted or in the absence of speed limit signs.

The New York State Department of Transportation sets speed limits in the vast majority of the state. Counties and most towns must petition DOT to change a speed limit. State law allows villages, cities, towns with more than 50,000 residents, and certain towns defined by law to be "suburban" to set speed limits on state, county, and local roads within their borders.

There is no state law regarding minimum speed limits, but a minimum speed limit of 40 mph has been set on the entire length of Interstate 787 and the entire length of Interstate 495 (the Long Island Expressway). The New York State Thruway does not have a firm minimum speed, but there are signs advising drivers to use their flashers when traveling at speeds below 40 mph.

New York does not have separate truck speed limits on its highways, except for the New England Thruway (Interstate 95), which has a limit of 50 mph for trucks and 55 mph for all other vehicles.

New York law allows area speed limits. An area speed limit applies to all highways within a specified area, except those specifically excluded. The area may be an entire municipality, or only a specific neighborhood. The defined area may also be the grounds of a school, hospital, or other institution. Area speed limits are signed at their perimeters with signs reading "Area Speed Limit" and the speed limit value shown below. "Area" may be replaced with a term that more precisely defines the area boundaries, such as "Town", "City", "Park", "Village" or "Campus".

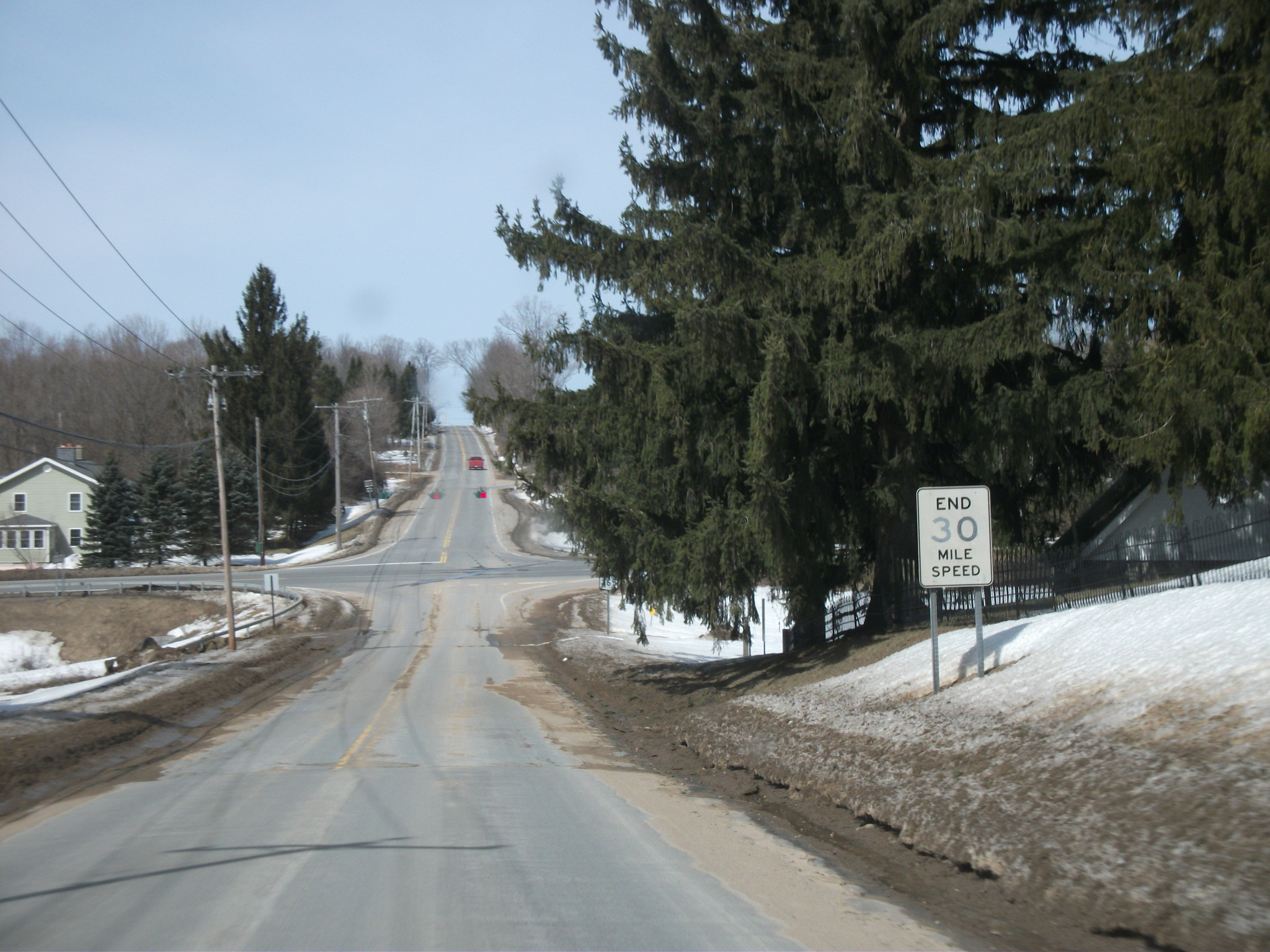
The phrase "End 30 Mile Speed" is occasionally seen on old signage marking the end of a speed zone; it was phased out in the 1980s.

Normally, the end of a lowered speed limit is marked with a sign reading "State Speed Limit 55", indicating that the statewide speed limit applies. In areas where a curve or other road condition makes the state speed limit inadvisable, a sign reading "End XX m.p.h. Limit" may be used, with XX replaced with the speed limit value. A "State Speed Limit 55" sign should be installed after the curve. This sign is sometimes misused in locations where the speed limit changes to a speed other than 55 mph. This is mainly applied on both undivided and divided rural non-freeway routes. Though rarely seen, some divided roadways are set as low as 45 mph but mainly stay at the state speed limit of 55 mph; in one exceptional case, that of the Scajaquada Expressway, the speed limit was lowered to 30 mph in 2016 after a fatality.

The top speed limit in most residential/urban and business district areas is at 30 mph, and state law prohibits speed limits below 25 mph on most common residential areas, though a speed limit of 25 is mainly only used in the New York City area and rarely seen outside of said area. School speed limits may be set as high as 45 mph (only on state speed limit roads in rural areas) to as low as 15 mph. New York City has established a number of 20 mph "Neighborhood Slow Zones" in residential neighborhoods. In residential neighborhood areas outside of New York City range between 30 and 40 mph and 35–45 mph on suburban/urban arterial routes.

New York's Criminal Procedure Law prevents law enforcement personnel from issuing a ticket for any offense that they did not witness personally, meaning that, among other ramifications, the state's electronic toll collection system can not be used for speed enforcement.

=== History ===
Many expressways and parkways in the New York City suburbs were posted as high as 65 mph in the early 1970s. During the 1973 Oil Embargo, New York lowered its speed limit to 50. The National Maximum Speed Law brought statewide speed limits up to 55. The city of New York, being a city, retained the 50 mph speed limit. New York restored its 65 mph speed limit in late 1995, soon before the NMSL was repealed.

Until September 2003, the state legislature needed to approve individual 65 mph zones, a lengthy process taking months or years of politically motivated debate. Then-Governor George Pataki signed legislation in September 2003 that enables NYSDOT and New York State Thruway Authority to raise speed limits to 65 mph on its roads that meet established design and safety standards. This legislation became active in March 2004, and the speed limit was subsequently raised to 65 mph on NY Route 7 (locally known as "Alternate Route 7"), Interstate 684 and Interstate 84 east of the Hudson River in New York.

== North Carolina ==
Unless otherwise posted, the speed limit in North Carolina is:

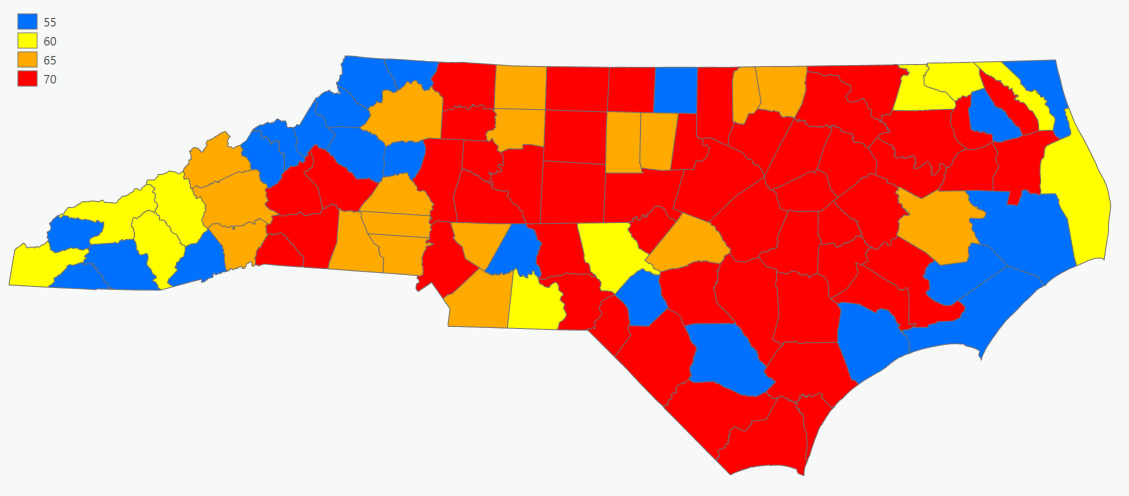
NC Speed Limits by County

- 55 mph (89 km/h) in rural areas
- 35 mph (56 km/h) within city limits

The highest maximum speed limit allowed under North Carolina state law is 70 mph (113 km/h) if determined to be "safe and reasonable" by NCDOT engineering studies. The state typically posts speed limits of 65 mph (105 km/h) on urban freeways and 70 mph (113 km/h) on rural freeways; some mountainous stretches are instead restricted to 60 mph (97 km/h).

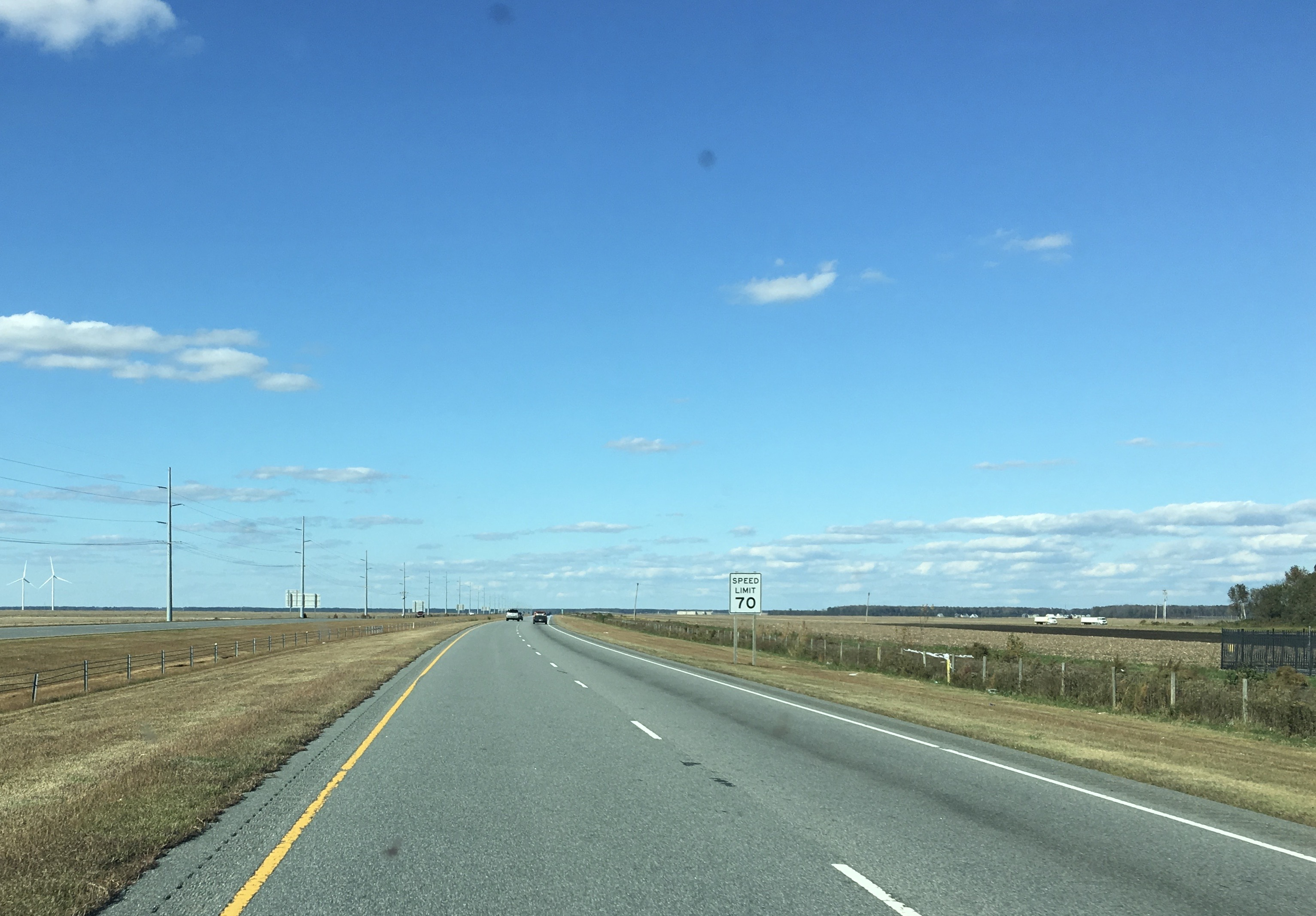
A typical speed limit 70 sign on US highway 17 near Elizabeth City.

This generally applies to non-freeway primary and secondary roads throughout the state. Prior to the National Maximum Speed Law that went into effect nationwide, North Carolina used to have 60 mph speed limits on two-lane primary and secondary roads. Warning signs are posted in all cases where the speed limit drops on a road. In addition, a "reduce speed ahead" sign is commonly posted on major highways, though it is being phased out.

It is rare that NCDOT will assign a speed drop greater than 20 mph. In Bertie County, the US 17 bypass in Windsor drops from 70 mph to 45 mph. In Moore County, Shady Lane Road outside of Carthage in the Hillcrest community drops from 55 mph to 30 mph. In Ocracoke, the speed limit on NC 12 southbound drops from 55 mph to 20 mph.

Although not statutory, it is relatively common to encounter 45 mph (72 km/h) speed limits. Many suburban 2- and 4-lane roads, as well as most 4-lane roads within municipal limits, carry a 45 mph speed limit. 45 mph speed limits are also not uncommon in more densely populated rural areas. Subdivision and residential streets generally, though not always carry a 25 mph (40 km/h) speed limit. However, when signs are not present, the speed limit is still 35 mph by default. In downtown areas, it's common to encounter 20 mph speed limits, although those are not statutory at the state level, and are typically controlled by the municipality the area is within. These speed limits are generally considered to be grandfathered in, per a policy from NCDOT stating new speed limits below 25 mph "will generally not be approved." Many arterial roads near the city limits are posted at 50 mph (80 km/h), but otherwise 50 mph is not commonly posted. Some urban interstates are posted at 50 mph, such as I-277 in downtown Charlotte.

School zone speed limits generally entail a 10 to 20 mph reduction below the original speed limit during times of day used for school arrivals and departures. Such a speed limit would be indicated when entering the school zone. Also, the default or modified speed limit is indicated after leaving the school zone. A school zone speed limit cannot be less than 20 mph.

Military bases are generally posted at a maximum of 50 mph. As of May 2010, Fort Bragg military two-lane roadways are now posted at 55 mph instead of 50 mph. Prior to May 2010, the speed limits higher than 50 mph through military bases were only on N.C. Highway 690 along the north side of Fort Bragg, Murchison Road (also known as N.C. Highway 210) and the All American Freeway (which is classified and numbered as a state-maintained Secondary Road even though it is a freeway).

The state park speed limit is 25 mph unless otherwise posted. These are not limited to places such as Hanging Rock State Park and Mount Mitchell State Park. The Blue Ridge Parkway is 45 mph. However, there are occasional 35 mph stretches. The National Park Service is responsible for highway maintenance and speed enforcement on the Parkway.

The county governments of North Carolina do not have any control over speed limits or any other aspect of road operation, as there are no county roads in the state. Municipalities, on the other hand, can set speed limits on city-controlled roadways, subject to applicable state laws. Freeways and expressways with no primary route number are part of the Secondary Road system and bear route numbers of 1000 or greater. Their maximum posted speed limit is 55 mph with four exceptions.

=== Other speed limits ===
There is a default minimum speed limit on Interstate and primary highways of 45 mph (72 km/h), but only when signs are present. The only roadway in North Carolina currently with a minimum speed limit is the I-77 Express Lanes, with a minimum of 45 mph. Generally there is no minimum on interstates to allow for slow moving farm equipment.

Highways do not generally have separate truck speed limits in North Carolina. There are a few exceptions however, such as I-40 from Old Fort to Black Mountain (35 mph) and from Waynesville to the Tennessee state line (50 mph) These limits are in place due to dangerous mountain curves and grades.

North Carolina operates a Safe Driving Incentive Plan (SDIP), a program that leads to insurance surcharges for moving violations based on a point system. In general, for speeding violations less than 10 mph over the posted speed limit in a speed zone less than 55 mph, one point is assessed; two points are assessed for exceeding 10 mph over the limit or speeding in a zone with a speed limit of greater than 55 mph.

A driver's license will be suspended for traveling faster than 15 mph over the speed limit, provided the speed traveled is greater than 55 mph; suspensions can result for other speeding infractions, such as traveling faster than 75 mph in a 65 mph or less zone or faster than 80 mph in a 70 mph zone. North Carolina law makes exceeding 80 mph anywhere in the state (regardless of the posted speed limit) a Class 3 Misdemeanor, as well as exceeding 15 mph over the posted speed limit.

In 2013, the North Carolina Senate passed a bill to explore raising the speed limit on certain low volume freeways to 75 mph (121 km/h). The bill would have given the DOT permission to raise the speed limit on freeways deemed safe for 75 mph travel. However, the House defeated the bill, and no efforts have been made to raise them since.

== North Dakota ==
As of August 2025, North Dakota's major interstates, I-29 and I-94, have an 80 mph (130 km/h) speed limit in most rural areas, with 55 to 70 mph (89 to 113 km/h) zones within portions of the Dickinson, Bismarck/Mandan, Jamestown, Valley City, Fargo, and Grand Forks urban areas. The state's 4-lane divided highways as well as 2 short stretches of undivided 4-lane highways (US 2 around Rugby and U.S. 83 as it passes the eastern Lake Sakakawea Reservoir) usually carry a 70 mph (110 km/h) limit, with 2-lane highways restricted to up to a 65 mph (105 km/h) limit, and gravel roads have up to 55 mph (89 km/h) limits. Roads within cities hold their own defined limits with 25 mph (40 km/h) speed limits common in residential streets and 25 to 40 mph (40 to 64 km/h) limits on urban 4-6-lane divided and undivided streets, with school zones at 15 to 25 mph (24 to 40 km/h).

The speed limits on rural sections of I-29 and I-94 were increased to 80 mph (130 km/h) on August 1, 2025.

== Northern Mariana Islands ==
The speed limit in the Northern Mariana Islands is 45 mph (72 km/h).

== Ohio ==
Prima facie speed limits defined in Ohio Rev. Code §4511.21(B). Other divisions of section 4511.21 define processes by which these speed limits may be increased or decreased along specific roadways.

The maximum speed limit found on highways in Ohio is 70 miles per hour (113 km/h) on the Ohio Turnpike, rural freeways, and both the expressway and freeway portions of US 30 from Mansfield to the Indiana state line and US 33 from Wapakoneta to St. Marys. The speed limit ranges from 55 to 70 mph (89 to 113 km/h) on other divided highways.

Ohio is the only state east of the Mississippi River to allow 70 mph speed limits on non-freeway roads. Both divided and non divided roads qualify.

Ohio has an urban speed limit of 65 mph (105 km/h) on Interstates by state law, yet many urban areas have lower speed limits due to safety concerns found in speed studies. These commonly are in the 50–60 mph (80–97 km/h) range. For instance, in most of metro Dayton and Cincinnati, as well as in downtown Columbus, the speed limit is 55 mph (89 km/h), while in Cleveland, Toledo, and Akron the speed limit is 60 mph (97 km/h); however, in central Cleveland along the Inner Belt, the speed limit is 50 mph (80 km/h). On one case, however, the Ohio Turnpike has a 70 mph (113 km/h) limit in the outer suburbs of Toledo, Akron, and Cleveland. Some urban areas are also posted with minimum speed limits, usually with a minimum of 40 or 45 mph (64 or 72 km/h). At one time, portions of Interstate 76 and Interstate 77 in downtown Akron had a maximum speed limit of 50 mph (80 km/h) and a minimum speed limit of 35 mph (56 km/h).

School zones in Ohio normally have a 20 mph (32 km/h) speed limit, regardless of the road's normal speed limit, in effect during school hours.

== Oklahoma ==
In Oklahoma, the maximum posted speed limit is 75–80 mph on turnpikes and 70-75 mph on all other freeways. Most other rural highways, divided or undivided, have a 65 mph speed limit (although some rural divided highways and some sections of undivided US 412 have a 70 mph limit). Rural sections of freeway or turnpike are supplemented with a sign warning "no tolerance". Also, rural four-lane turnpikes carry a minimum speed limit of 60 mph. On May 9, 2016, Governor Mary Fallin signed HB 3167 which removes numerical caps on rural highway speed limits in Oklahoma which took effect in November 2016. Even with this bill the speed limits across the state were not expected to change because of budget issues in doing studies In April 2019, a new bill was signed into law by Governor Kevin Stitt that raised the limit to 80 mph on turnpikes and 75 on other freeways.

On July 28, 2020, the Oklahoma Turnpike Authority approved raising posted speed limits to 80 mph on 104 miles of turnpikes:

- Turner Turnpike from mile marker (MM) 203 to MM 216, between Bristow and Sapulpa, 13 miles
- Muskogee Turnpike from MM 2 to MM 33, between Muskogee and Tulsa, 31 miles
- Cherokee Turnpike from MM 3 to MM 28, 25 miles
- Indian Nation Turnpike from MM 93 to MM 104, between SH-9 and I-40, 11 miles
- H.E. Bailey Turnpike (Norman Spur) from MM 102 to MM 107, 5 miles
- Kickapoo Turnpike from MM 130 to MM 149, between I-40 and the Turner Turnpike, 19 miles

Existing speed limits on rural turnpikes like the Will Rogers Turnpike, main segment of the H.E. Bailey Turnpike, Cimarron Turnpike and Chickasaw Turnpike will not be changed as part of this action.

On August 3, 2020, the Oklahoma Transportation Commission approved increasing the speed limit from 70 to 75 mph on nearly 400 miles of I-35 and I-40. The sections on I-35 are from the Texas border to the OK 74 overpass south of Purcell and from just north of the Oklahoma/Logan County line to the Kansas border. On I-40, the speed limit will be increased from just west of Sallisaw to just east of Shawnee, from just west of Yukon to just east of Weatherford, from Clinton to just east of Elk City and from just west of the junction with OK 34 to the Texas border.

On April 26, 2022, the Oklahoma Turnpike Authority approved raising posted speed limits to 80 mph on another 23 miles of the Indian Nation Turnpike from MM 70 to MM 93.

On April 4, 2023, the Oklahoma Turnpike Authority approved raising posted speed limits to 80 mph on another 143 miles of turnpikes:

- Cimarron Turnpike from mile marker (MM) 0 to MM 59, 59 miles
- Cimarron Turnpike (Stillwater Spur) from MM 21A to 27A, 6 miles
- H.E. Bailey Turnpike from MM 47 to MM 106, between Lawton and Newcastle, 59 miles
- Muskogee Turnpike from MM 37 to MM 56, between Muskogee and I-40, 19 miles

Existing speed limits on rural turnpikes like the Will Rogers Turnpike and Chickasaw Turnpike will not be changed as part of this action.

== Oregon ==
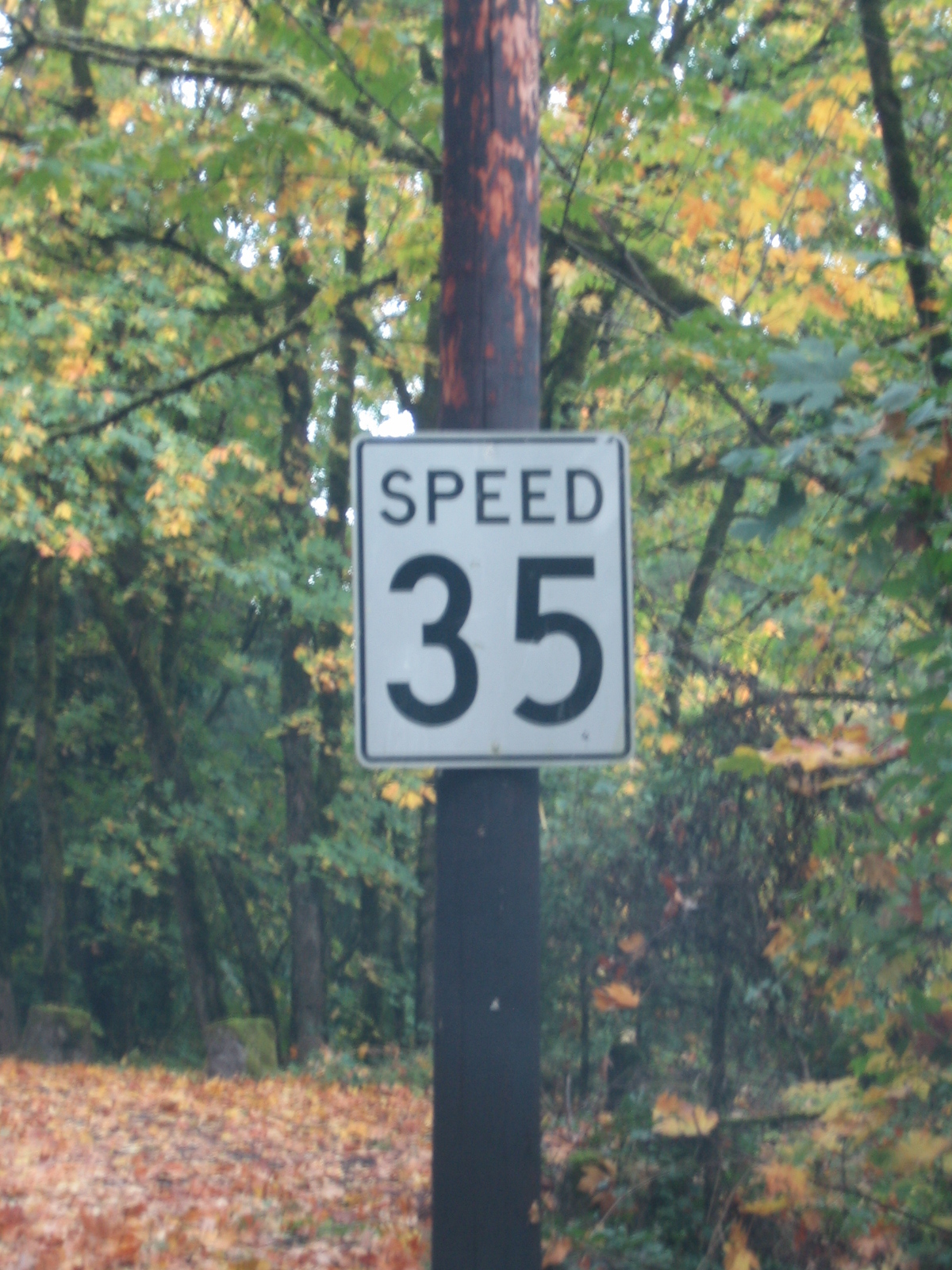
A standard-style Oregon speed sign removing the word "limit"

The highest posted speed limit in Oregon is 70 mph on I-84 east of The Dalles, I-82 and US 95 (trucks 65 mph). The highest speed limit on I-5 is 65 mph (105 km/h) because it passes almost exclusively through mountainous areas. Oregon state statutes allow for a maximum speed limit of 70 mph on rural interstate highways, and the law gives the Oregon Department of Transportation (ODOT) discretion to define which freeway segments to post the 70 mph speed limit. ODOT did not raise speed limits beyond 65 mph on other freeways, and strongly opposed legislative efforts to raise the maximum allowable speed limit. However, in July 2015, Governor Kate Brown signed a bill raising speed limits on several highways in eastern Oregon; the bill included provisions to raise the speed limit to 70 mph on I-84 and US 95. It was announced on October 6, 2017, that the truck speed limit will be increasing to 60 mph on rural interstate highways where the car speed limit is 65 mph as soon as new signs are posted. In all rural areas in Oregon, the speed limit is 55 unless otherwise posted.

Until 2002, Oregon state law required that all speed limit signs omit the word LIMIT from their display. The reasoning behind this was related to the explicit "basic speed" law that existed, which allowed citation for exceeding speeds "too fast for conditions" regardless of the posted speed. The typeface of the numerals on the signs varies greatly depending on which jurisdiction made the sign, due to its non-standardized design. In 2002, the Oregon Department of Transportation revised its supplement to the MUTCD, mandating the omission of the word LIMIT except on signs posted on Interstate highways and within city limits. As of 2014, ODOT has replaced nearly all SPEED signs posted on Interstates with SPEED LIMIT signs, but it was left to the various city governments to replace signs in their jurisdictions at their leisure, if at all. Thus, older SPEED signs are still a common sight across the state.

=== Attempts to raise speed limits ===
In 2003, the Oregon state legislature passed a bill that would have raised the maximum permissible speed limit on Interstate Highways to 70 mph for cars with a 5 mph differential for trucks, up from the previous 65 mph limit for cars with a 10 mph differential; this bill was signed into law by then newly elected Governor Ted Kulongoski on September 26, 2003. Although ODOT's 2004 study revealed that it is safe for cars to be traveling at 70 mph and trucks at 60 mph the Oregon Department of Transportation decided to not initially implement the increase out of concerns that it would not be safe to have trucks traveling at 65 mph. Prior to the National Maximum Speed Law, the speed limit on Oregon freeways was 75 mph with some 70 limits on two-lane roads in eastern portions of the state. On July 20, 2015, Governor Brown signed HB 3402 into law. This bill raises the speed limit on I-84 east of The Dalles, I-82 (HB 4047 signed 2/23/16) and US 95 to 70 mph for cars and 65 mph for trucks. It also increases speed limits on several other two lane rural highways to 65 mph for cars and 60 mph for trucks in Eastern Oregon. The law took effect on March 1, 2016.

=== School speed limits ===
In 2004, a law was passed revising Oregon's school speed limit laws. In school zones, on roads with speed limits of 30 mph or below, drivers were required to slow to 20 mph 24 hours a day, 365 days a year, regardless of whether or not children were present. This replaced most 'when children are present' placards. If the speed limit was 35 mph or higher, the school zone limit would be imposed either by flashing yellow lights or a placard denoting times and days of the week when the limit was in effect. The at-all-times rule was highly unpopular with motorists and was widely ignored. In 2006, the law was revised again, taking away the 'at all times' requirement and replacing it with a time-of-day system (usually school days, 7 a.m. to 5 pm). School crossings with flashing yellow lights remain. In many communities, school zones are strictly enforced and speed traps in these areas are commonly employed.

ODOT has not chosen a variation of speed between two-lane roads in Oregon, regardless of the terrain. Any rural two-lane road in the state has a default speed limit of 55 mph. Town speed limits are 20 mph in an alley, 20 mph in a school zone, 35 mph on boulevards, and 45 mph on roads with traffic lights.

== Pennsylvania ==
70 mph speed limit signs on the Pennsylvania Turnpike

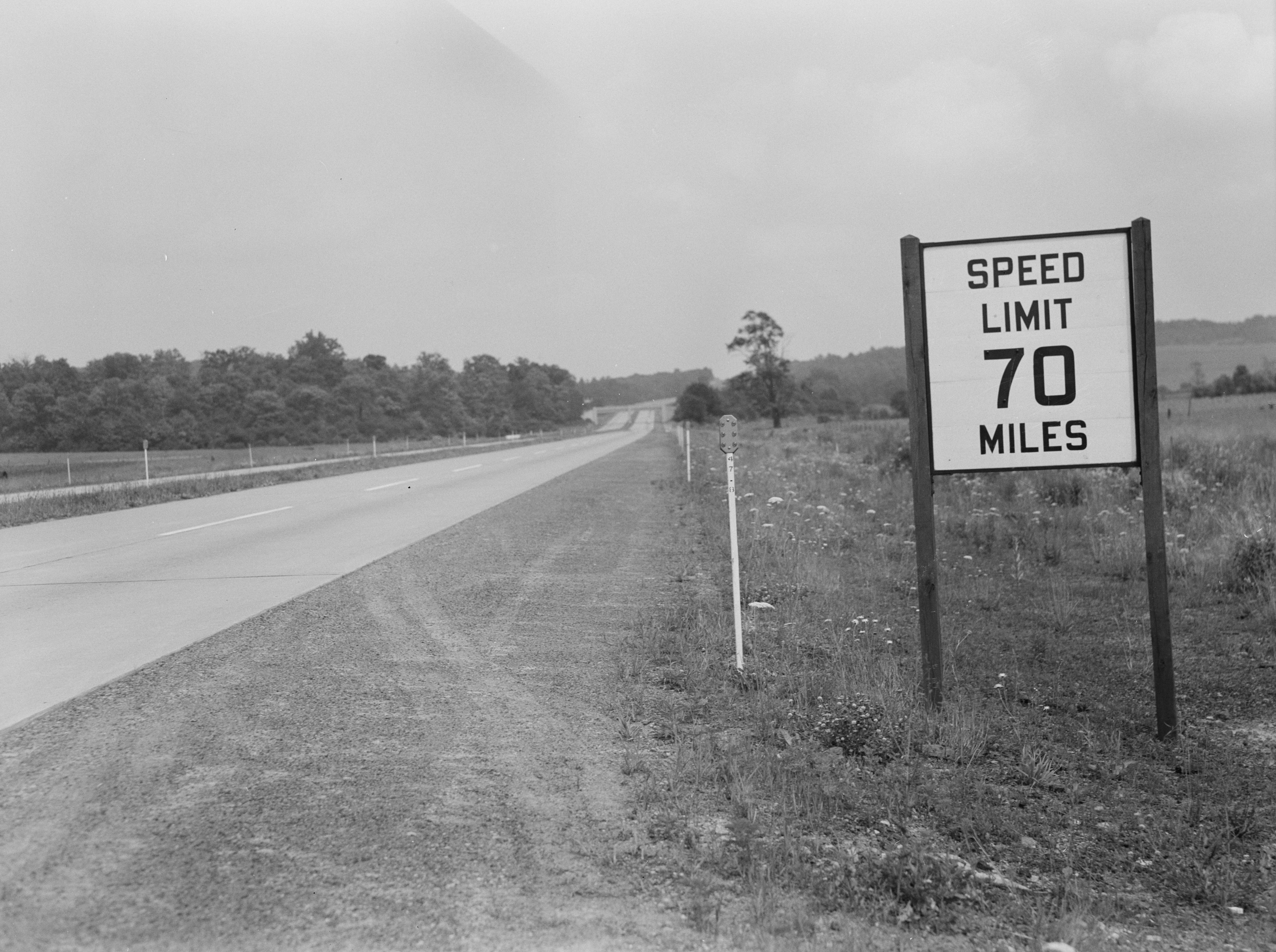
1942

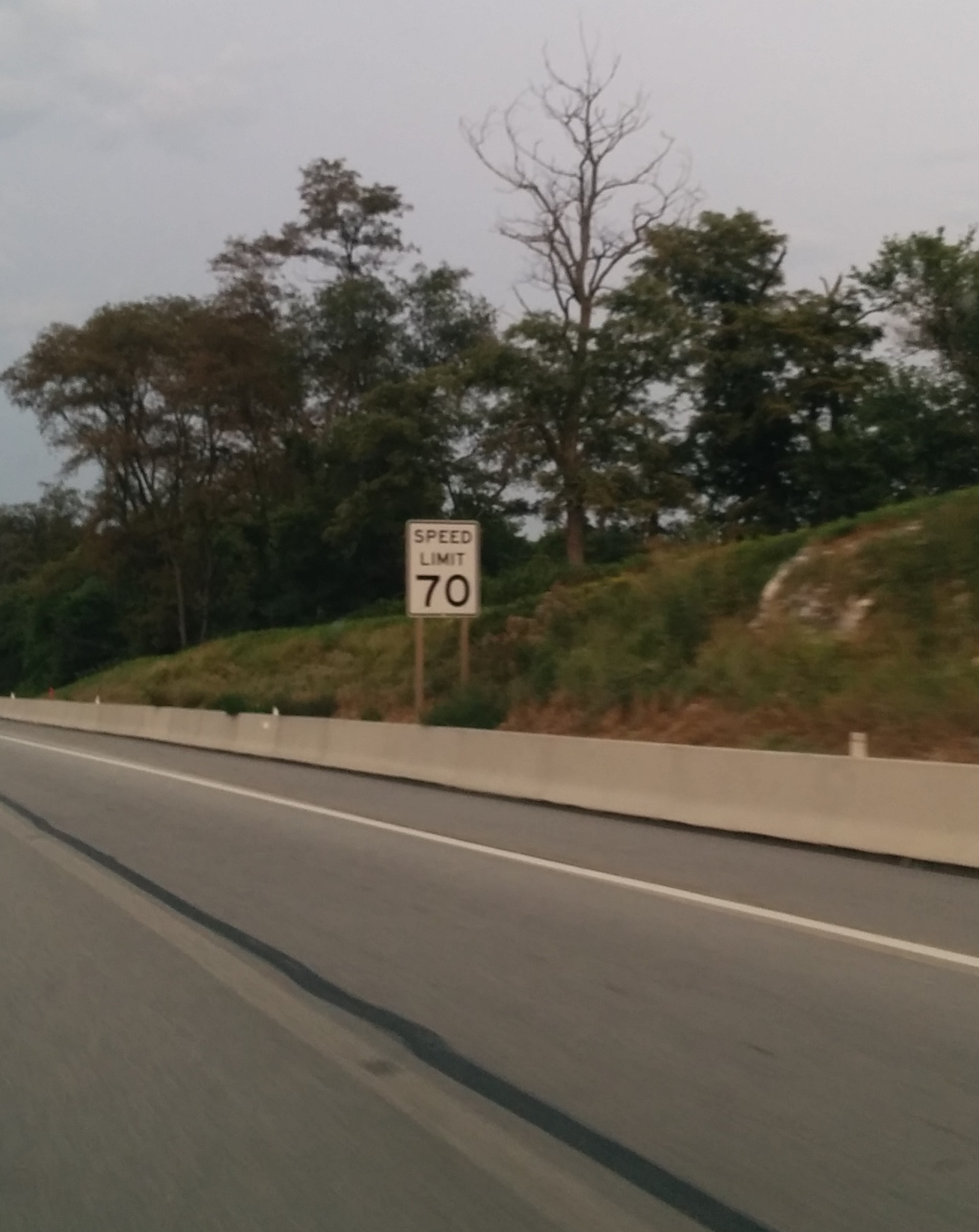
2014

In Pennsylvania, the maximum freeway speed limit is generally 65 mph (105 km/h), with select sections of rural freeway and most of the Pennsylvania Turnpike signed at 70 mph (113 km/h), or 55 mph (89 km/h) such as most of standalone Interstate 70. The speed limit on urban freeways ranges from a low of 40 mph in downtown Pittsburgh and Philadelphia to a high of 70 mph on the Pennsylvania Turnpike around outer parts of Pittsburgh and Philadelphia.

In 1940, when the Pennsylvania Turnpike was opened between Irwin and Carlisle, the entire 160-mile limited-access toll road did not have a speed limit, similar to that of the German Autobahns. In 1941, a speed limit of 70 mph (113 km/h) was established, only to be reduced to 35 mph (56 km/h) during the war years (1942–45). After WWII, the limit was raised to 70 mph on the four-lane sections, with the two-lane tunnels posted at 50 mph (80 km/h) for cars and 40 mph (64 km/h) for trucks. Before the 1974 federal speed limit law, all Interstates and the Turnpike had a 65 mph (105 km/h) speed limit on rural stretches and a 60 mph (97 km/h) speed limit in urban areas.

In 1995, the state raised the speed limit on rural stretches of Interstate Highways and the Pennsylvania Turnpike system to 65 mph (105 km/h), with urban areas having a 55 mph (89 km/h) limit. In 1997, PennDOT raised the speed limit on some rural non-Interstate Highway bypasses to 65 mph (105 km/h). In 2005, with the change in the designation of "urban zones" in the state, the entire lengths of both the Pennsylvania Turnpike's east–west mainline and Northeast Extension were given 65 mph (105 km/h) limits, except at the tunnels and through the winding 5.5 miles (8.9 km) eastern approach to the Allegheny Mountain Tunnel.

The 70 mph speed limit was authorized by House Bill 1060, which was signed by Governor Tom Corbett on November 25, 2013. On July 18, 2014, the Pennsylvania Turnpike Commission announced the return of the 70 mph speed limit on a 97-mile stretch of the mainline from the Blue Mountain interchange (MP 201) to the Morgantown interchange (MP 298). Signs were erected on July 22, 2014. On July 23, 2014, PennDOT announced the speed limit will be increased to 70 mph on I-80 between interchange 101 in DuBois, Clearfield County and milepost 189 in Clinton County and on I-380 between interchange 8 (MP 10) near Mount Pocono, Monroe County and the junction with I-84 in Lackawanna County, on or around August 11, 2014, as a pilot project. On March 15, 2016, the Pennsylvania Turnpike Commission approved raising the speed limit on the remaining 65 mph (105 km/h) sections of the turnpike to 70 mph (115 km/h); sections that were posted at 55 mph (89 km/h) would retain that speed limit. A total of 396 miles (637 km) of the Pennsylvania Turnpike system increased from 65 to 70 mph (105 to 115 km/h), including the extensions in Southwestern Pennsylvania. The speed limit remains 55 mph (89 km/h) within construction zones and tunnels, at mainline toll plazas, on the eastern approach of the Allegheny Mountain Tunnel, and between Bensalem and the Delaware River Bridge. On May 2, 2016, PennDOT announced that the speed limit would be increased to 70 mph (115 km/h) on about 800 miles (1,300 km) of roadway across the state, including rural stretches of I-79, I-80, I-99, I-380, and US 15, with conversion to take place on May 3.

On non-freeway roads, speed limits are generally held at 55 mph (89 km/h) for rural four-lane roads, 55 mph (89 km/h) for rural two-lane roads, 45–55 mph (72–89 km/h) for urban four lane roads and 40–45 (sometimes, but rarely, 50 mph) mph (64–72 km/h) for urban two-lane roads, 35–45 mph for roads in commercial business areas, 3035 mph (56 km/h) for major roads in residential areas, 2025 mph (40 km/h) for most municipal residential streets, including main north–south and east–west roads in county seats and other mid-sized to large towns, and 1520 mph (32 km/h) for school zones during school arrival and departure times only. It is also only in effect on days that the school the road goes near is in session. Many schools have signs that blink when the school speed limit is in effect. There is no reduced school speed on divided highways, even if the school sits right beside the highway.

All state-owned two-lane roads in rural areas within Pennsylvania have a default speed limit of 55 mph unless otherwise posted.

The Pennsylvania Turnpike has a minimum speed limit of 15 mph below the posted maximum speed, though the minimum is only sporadically posted. This is not enforced for slow-moving trucks in areas with steep grades and signs are posted that instruct drivers to use their flashers (hazard lights or four-ways) if traveling below 50 mph (40 if the speed limit is 55). Pennsylvania has no default minimum speed limit on any other roads. However, minimum speed limits on certain highways may be enacted and posted as provided by Section 3364(c) of the Pennsylvania Motor Vehicle Code (Title 75 of the Pennsylvania Consolidated Statutes).

§3364(a) also requires, "Except when reduced speed is necessary for safe operation or in compliance with law, whenever any person drives a vehicle upon a roadway having width for not more than one lane of traffic in each direction at less than the maximum posted speed and at such a slow speed as to impede the normal and reasonable movement of traffic, the driver shall, at the first opportunity when and where it is reasonable and safe to do so and after giving appropriate signal, drive completely off the roadway and onto the berm or shoulder of the highway. The driver may return to the roadway after giving appropriate signal only when the movement can be made in safety and so as not to impede the normal and reasonable movement of traffic."

Drivers cannot be stopped by police for driving less than 6 mph over the posted speed limit (10 mph if the speed limit is less than 55 mph and non-radar timing devices are used, as use of radar devices is limited to "members of the Pennsylvania State Police" by §3368c2).

In October 2018, Governor Tom Wolf signed into law a bill authorizing the use of speed cameras in active construction zones on Interstate highways.

== Puerto Rico ==
As effectively from the law, the following speed limits are:

- 25 mph (40 km/h) in urban areas.
- 45 mph (72 km/h) in rural areas.
- 65 mph (105 km/h) in freeways or expressways.
- 15 to 25 mph (24–40 km/h) in urban and rural school zones, when children are present.

Most freeways can have speed limits up to 65 mph (105 km/h), while other expressways have speed limits up to 55 mph. The rural default speed limit is 45 mph but may be increased to 50 mph (80 km/h). In residential areas, only multilane roads have limits up to 35 mph (56 km/h), other roads are restricted to a maximum speed of 25 mph (40 km/h). Only urban and rural school zones have limits up to 15 to 25 mph (24–40 km/h). Vehicles carrying hazardous materials are limited to 20 to 30 mph (32–48 km/h) in urban and rural areas.

== Rhode Island ==
Along two-lane roadways, the default speed limit is 50 mph (80 km/h) during the daytime outside a business or residential district. "Daytime" means a half-hour before sunset and a half-hour after sunrise. At night time and also uncommon on the East Coast, the default speed limit is 45 mph (72 km/h) outside a business or residential district. Through the CBD and residential district, the default speed limit is 25 mph (40 km/h). Through school zones within 300 feet (91 m), the default speed limit is 20 mph (32 km/h). Local governments are barred from raising the default speed limits during the day and at night. Interstates are generally posted at 65 mph (105 km/h) through rural areas, 55 mph (89 km/h) closer to Providence, and as low as 45 mph (72 km/h) through the segment of I-95 known locally as the "Pawtucket 'S'-Curves". Divided arterials and freeways other than Interstate are posted no higher than 55 mph. On April 12, 1996, speed limit of 65 mph allowed on rural interstates based on engineering studies. However, the only interstates raised to 65 mph are Interstate 95 from exits 1–24B and Interstate 295.

== South Carolina ==
Interstate speed limits in South Carolina are posted at 70 mph (113 km/h). Interstates passing through "Urban" areas are dropped to 60 mph (97 km/h). The urban area assignment of 60 mph usually includes the metropolitan area and the actual inner city area. The only exceptions to the rule are I-385 in Greenville, I-85 in Spartanburg, the SC 31 freeway around Myrtle Beach and I-95 around Florence. I-385 has a 55 mph speed limit at its terminus within the Greenville area. SC 31 is posted at 65 mph (105 km/h) even though it is in the greater Myrtle Beach area. SC 31 was originally posted at 60 mph when it was built in 2004. I-95 even as a 6 lane semi-urban built freeway generally maintains a 70 mph speed limit through the Florence area, except between exits 160 and 164 where the speed limit is 60 mph. It is 6 lanes from SC 327 to I-20.

Four-lane arterials by default are posted at 60 mph (97 km/h). Four-lane bypasses at 60 mph can be found in Marion and Sumter, but others remain at 55 mph (89 km/h). It is not uncommon that 55 mph can be expected in more built-up areas prior to municipalities and/or if the engineering on the highway is below standards. However, U.S. Route 123 has a divided expressway segment where the speed limit is 65 mph (105 km/h).

Two-lane roads are 55 mph by default. However, a handful of counties maintained as either state secondary roads or county roads are posted at 45 mph (72 km/h).

Central business districts (CBDs) are posted at 30 mph (48 km/h). However, a recent trend is occurring with CBD speed limits that they are being signed at 25 mph (40 km/h) in numerous municipalities around the state.

Speed limit drops generally are done in 10 mph increments but 20 mph drops are not uncommon. Improvements in the mid-2000s were done by SCDOT to warn motorists ahead of time for speed drops on various roadways. However, there are still some roadways that have not received that treatment. However, there are a couple roadways that get 25 mph to 30 mph drops as well. The speed limit drops from 55 mph (89 km/h) to 25 mph (40 km/h) at a traffic circle with US 378 and SC 391 in eastern Saluda County. On US 52 northbound approaching Kingstree, the speed limit drops from 60 mph (97 km/h) to 35 mph (56 km/h).

== South Dakota ==
Shortly after the December 1995 repeal of the 65/55 mph National Maximum Speed Law, South Dakota raised its general rural speed limits to 75 mph (121 km/h) on freeways and 65 mph (105 km/h) on other roads along with 70 mph (113 km/h) on a few 4 lane divided highways. Almost a decade after posting the 75 mph limit, average speeds on South Dakotan rural freeways remain at or below the speed limit. In the urban areas of Sioux Falls and Rapid City, a 65 mph speed limit is posted on Interstates 90 and 29. In March 2015, SD State Legislature has passed the bill to raise the speed limit on Interstate 29 and Interstate 90 to 80 mph (129 km/h). It was signed into law and took effect in April 2015. While the 80 mph speed limit was initially signed on all rural freeways in the state, the Interstate 90 stretch from Rapid City to the Wyoming Border returned to 75 mph due to safety concerns.

== Tennessee ==
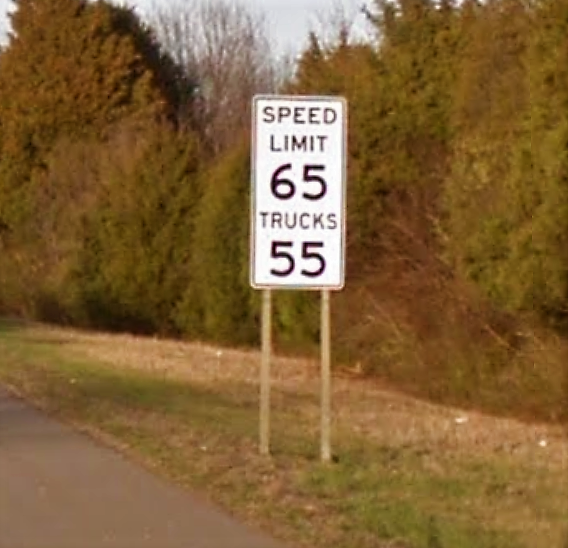
An "environmental" speed limit along I-75 near Loudon, Tennessee, which was in effect between 2006 and 2018. These were enacted in some of the major metropolitan areas of Tennessee after all of Tennessee's major cities failed to meet the Environmental Protection Agency (EPA)'s guidelines for air quality.

Tennessee statutes require rural interstates to be posted at exactly 70 mph (113 km/h) unless a traffic study is performed indicating that such a speed is unsafe. These include all of the state's two-digit Interstates except Interstate 55 and Interstate 26, whose highest posted speed limits for passenger vehicles in Tennessee is 65 mph (105 km/h). The only auxiliary interstates in Tennessee with a 70 mph speed limit are Interstate 155, Interstate 269, and Interstate 840. 70 mph speed limits are required on other controlled access highways that are part of the State or Federal Highway Systems unless a traffic study indicates this speed is unsafe. Any other controlled access road in the state may be posted up to 70 mph, but this is not a legal requirement, and a study is not required to be performed before this is done. Examples of 70 mph limits are found on controlled-access portions of US 51 and SR 22, SR 111, SR 386, and SR 396. In 70 mph zones, the default minimum speed limit is 55. Urban interstates are generally posted at 55 to 65 mph, however, portions of Interstates 24, 40, and 65 and S.R. 386 in Nashville, as well as I-24 in Clarksville and Murfreesboro are posted at 70 mph. One brief S.R. 100 freeway in Henderson has a speed limit of only 50 mph, as does a S.R. 381 freeway in Johnson City, but both still have signs at every entrance ramp and even the southern end of the latter freeway warning that pedestrians, non-motorized traffic and motor driven cycles are prohibited.

Four-lane divided highways in rural areas are normally posted at the statutory 65 mph (105 km/h), although some are posted at 55 mph (89 km/h) and 60 mph (97 km/h). It is a common misconception that undivided highways may only be posted up to 55 mph (89 km/h) in Tennessee. Though a vast majority of undivided highways have, at most, posted 55 mph speed limits, Tennessee's statutory speed limits do not differentiate between divided and undivided highways, per TN Code § 55-8-152(a) (2018), so the statutory limit of 65 mph (105 km/h) usually applies to undivided highways in the absence of signage or local ordinances to the contrary. Notable examples of 65 mph undivided highways are multiple stretches SR 22 surrounding the town of Dresden, where the road has two lanes in each direction (four lanes total), sometimes containing a central dual turn lane, and a bridge on U.S. Route 64 between Somerville and Laconia that briefly becomes undivided but maintains the highway's usual 65 mph speed limit. U.S. Route 412 also contains a 60 mph four-lane undivided highway between Columbia and Hohenwald, as does Tennessee State Route 52 between Livingston and Celina.

Speed limits set by municipalities could range from 15 to 55 mph, depending on the type of roadway. This is because the state of Tennessee grants strong home rule powers to municipalities and Dillon's Rule for unincorporated areas in the county for speed limit assignments on non-controlled access state-maintained roads, requiring that they fall within established constraints. Out of Tennessee's 95,523 miles (153,729 km) of public road, a vast majority of 81,639 miles (131,385 km) are maintained by localities.

In the 2000s, the major cities of Memphis, Knoxville, and Chattanooga petitioned TDOT to enact environmental speed limits in their respective counties after failing to meet EPA air quality standards, reducing speed limits from 70 mph to 65 mph and 55 mph for trucks. Knox County (Knoxville) also petitioned the state to enact these speed limits in all of the neighboring counties of the Knoxville Metropolitan Area, as well as Jefferson County. These moves were controversial, as people believed the actual purpose was to increase revenue from speeding tickets, and the Tennessee Highway Patrol (THP) reportedly started enforcing these as 70 mph zones in the Knoxville area after multiple truckers successfully won court cases and had their tickets dismissed. In 2018, these split speed limits on I-75 and I-40 in Roane and Loudon counties southwest of Knoxville were increased back to 70. On February 19, 2019, 70 mph speed limit signs were installed on I-40 and I-81 east of Knox County starting at exit 398, and in October 2019, the last of these split speed limits were increased to 70 mph on I-40 east of Knoxville and to 65 mph west of Knoxville with no separate restrictions for trucks. In Nashville, speed limits for freeways are posted at 55 mph at the center of the city, and 65 and 70 mph beyond, with no separate restrictions for trucks. I-26 and I-81 in Kingsport, Bristol, and Johnson City continue with the staggered limits.

Prior to 1974, the maximum speed limit on Tennessee's Interstate highways was 75 mph (121 km/h) day or night for cars and 65 mph (105 km/h) day or night for trucks. Other rural highways had a maximum speed limit of 65 mph day and 55 mph (89 km/h) night for divided highways and 55 mph for all other highways. Many of these other class roadways also had separate day and night speed limits as well.

== Texas ==
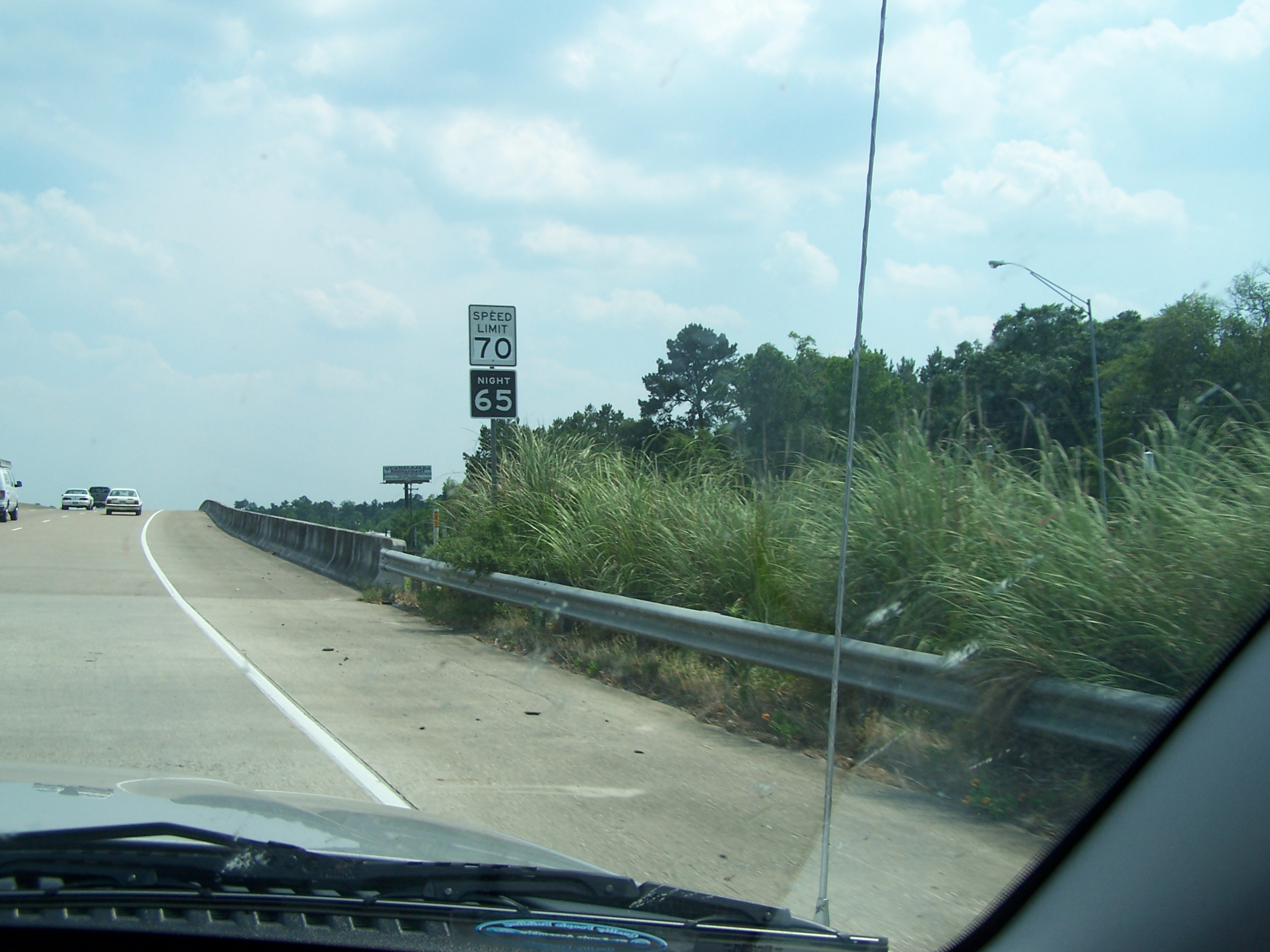
Typical Texas rural speed limit sign before September 2011. Note the black backgrounded 65 mph night speed limit sign, which was common on Texas roads. (No other state had a universal night speed limit.) This sign is on southbound U.S. 69/96/287 just north of Beaumont. Note that night speed limits have been abolished since this photo was taken.

Texas does not prescribe a different speed limit for each road type in its state or federal highway system. Texas law generally prescribes a statutory speed limit of 70 mph (113 km/h) for any rural road that is maintained by the state government (including United States Numbered Highways and Interstate Highways)—whether two lane, four lane, freeway, or otherwise—60 mph (97 km/h) for roads outside an urban district that are not state-maintained highways, and 30 mph (48 km/h) for streets in an urban district.

The law allows raising or lowering the statutory limit only if an engineering and traffic investigation indicates that a different limit is appropriate. Texas allows a speed limit of up to 75 miles per hour (121 km/h) to be posted on federal or state highways, city maintained roads, and toll roads, and up to 70 miles per hour (113 km/h) on county roads. Through a separate provision, speed limits up to 80 mph (129 km/h) or 85 mph (137 km/h) can be established on certain highways.

=== Truck speed limits ===
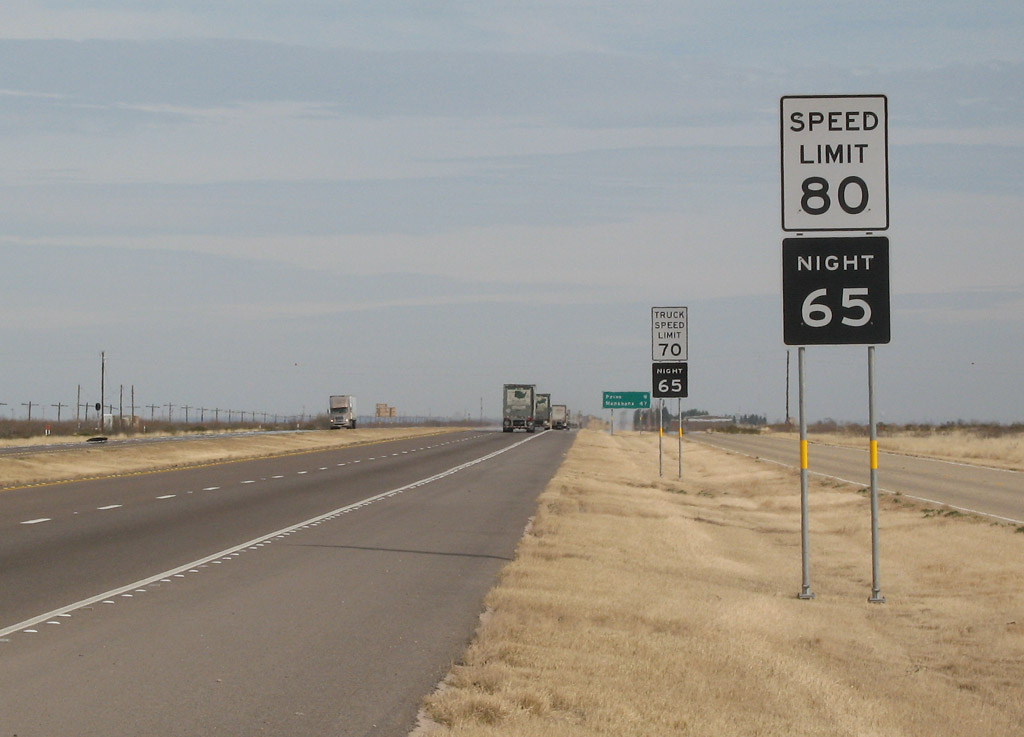
Example of 70 mph truck speed limit sign immediately behind an 80 mph speed limit sign, before truck speed limits were abolished

Texas once had separate, systemwide truck speed limits, but they were repealed in 1999 and 2011.

The truck speed limit used to be 60 mph (97 km/h) day/55 mph (89 km/h) night when the regular limit was higher. This speed limit did not apply to buses or to trucks transporting United States Postal Service mail.

Truck speed limits disappeared when all speed limits were capped at 55 mph (89 km/h) in 1974. They reappeared with the introduction of 65 mph (105 km/h) limits in 1987.

Effective September 1, 1999, Texas repealed truck speed limits on all roads except farm to market and ranch to market roads.

In 2001, a bill allowing 75 mph speed limit on roads in certain counties excluded trucks, introducing a 70 mph truck speed limit on roads with a higher limit. A bill in 2005 allowing 80 mph speed limits still excluded trucks. However, truck speed limits were fully repealed in 2011.

=== Night speed limits ===
Before September 1, 2011, Texas had a statutory 65 mph (105 km/h) night speed limit on all roads with a higher daytime limit. In 2011, the Texas Legislature banned night speed limits effective September 1, 2011. However, as of June 2013, night speed limits (55) were retained on some county roads where the speed limit is 60 mph in Scurry County, just outside of Snyder, Texas.

=== Environmental speed limits ===
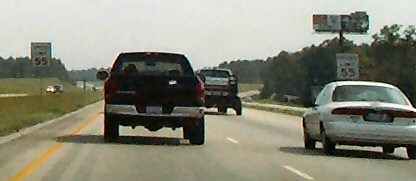
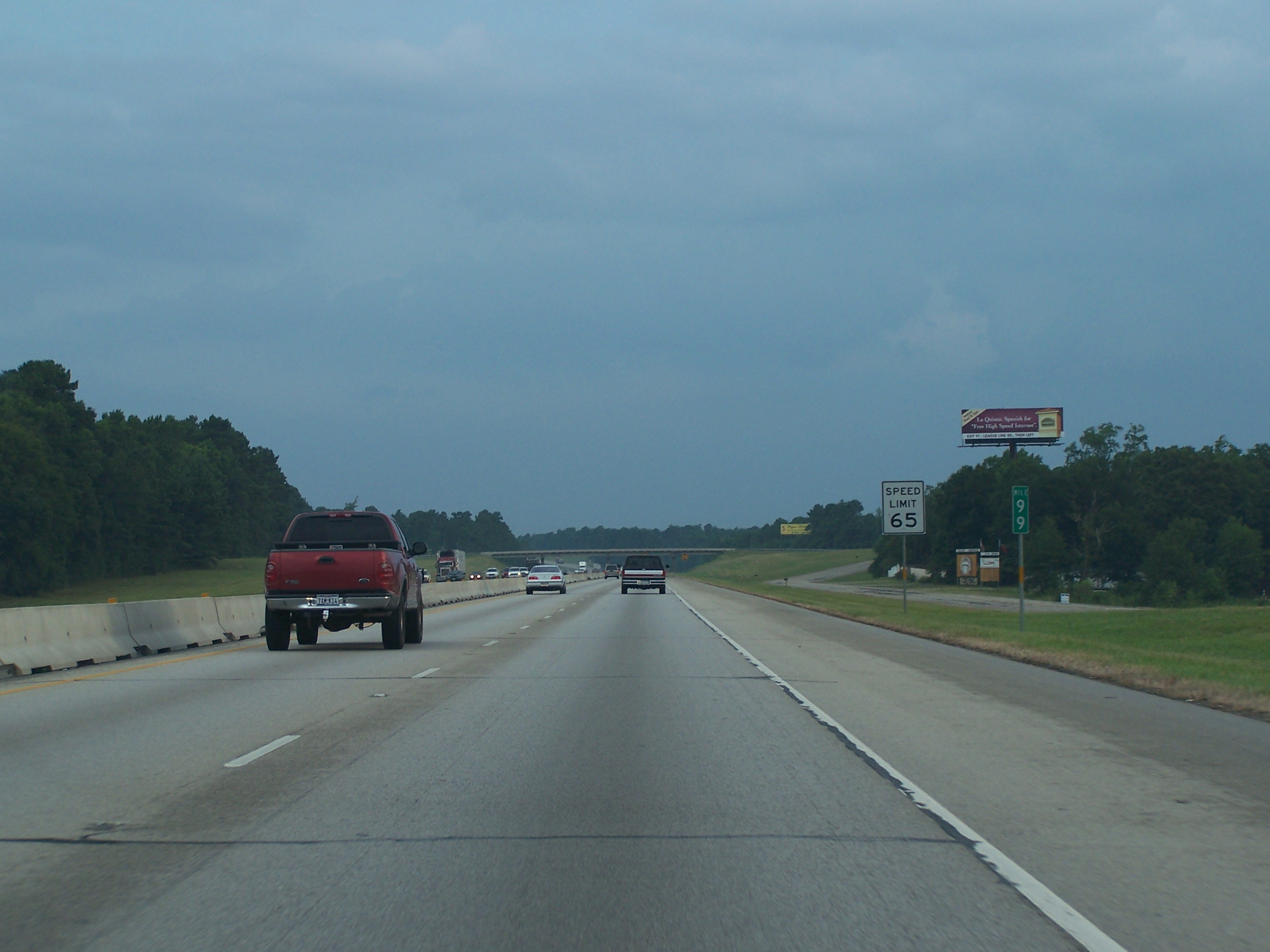
Photos of southbound I-45 at the north border of Montgomery County, showing speed limit change from 2002 to 2005

Texas is the first state to lower speed limits for air quality reasons, although the lowered limits may not meaningfully improve air quality.

In roughly a 50-mile (80 km) radius of the Houston–Galveston and Dallas–Ft. Worth regions, the Texas Commission on Environmental Quality convinced the Texas Department of Transportation to reduce the speed limit on all roads with 70 or 65 mph (113 or 105 km/h) speed limits by 5 mph. This was instituted as part of a plan to reduce smog-forming emissions in areas out of compliance with the federal Clean Air Act.

Initial studies found that lower speed limits could provide roughly 1.5% of the emissions reductions required for Clean Air Act compliance. However, follow-up studies found that the actual reduction is far less:

1. The emissions modeling software initially used, MOBILE 5a, overestimated the emissions contribution of speed limit reductions. Rerunning the models with the next generation software, MOBILE 6, produced dramatically lower emissions reductions.
2. Speed checks in the Dallas area performed 1 year after implementation of speed limit reductions show that actual speed reductions are only about 1.6 mph, a fraction of the anticipated 10% (5.5 mph) speed reduction.

With both of these facts combined, it is possible that the speed limit reductions only provide a thousandth of the total emissions reductions necessary for Clean Air Act compliance.

In mid-2002, all speed limits in the Houston–Galveston area were capped at 55 mph (89 km/h). Facing immense opposition, poor compliance, and the finding that lowered speed limits produced only a fraction of the originally estimated emissions reductions, the TCEQ relented and reverted to the 5 mph reduction scheme.

Due to its enormous unpopularity, the Texas Commission on Environmental Quality examined alternatives to the 55 mph speed cap. Analysis suggested that the vast majority of emissions reductions were from reduced heavy truck emissions. A proposed alternative was to restore passenger vehicle limits but retain a 55 mph truck speed limit. Concerns about safety problems and enforceability of such a large differential (up to 15 mph on many roads) scuttled that proposal, and a compromise plan, described above, was enacted that retained uniform, but still reduced, speed limits.

In 2003, the Texas Legislature prospectively banned environmental speed limits, effective September 1, 2003. The wording of the bill allows environmental speed limits already in place to remain, but no new miles of roadway may be subjected to environmental speed limits.

=== Elimination of Dallas-Fort Worth region environmental speed limits ===
In 2009, the North Texas Tollway Authority raised the speed limit by 10 mph on two tollways. Several miles of these tollways had 60 mph environmental speed limits. These new 70 mph limits exceeded what is allowable under the environmental speed limit regime. (Note: For clarity, Texas's environmental speed limits (ESLs) or their prospective ban did not apply to a substantial portion of NTTA roadways. Many miles of NTTA roadways never were subjected to ESLs because either 1. they never had a 65 mph or higher limit or 2. the road first opened after ESLs were repealed. If both were not the case, then the road segment had an ESL, and the prospective ban would have retained the ESL indefinitely.) NTTA was allowed to raise the speed limits by offsetting the higher limits' theoretical emissions increases with other transportation-related emissions reduction measures, including implementation of all-electronic tolling, which eliminated the need for some vehicles to stop at a toll booth.

In 2015, the Texas Department of Transportation cancelled all remaining environmental speed limits in the Dallas-Fort Worth region. Some speed limits were changed back to those in place before the environmental speed limits were enacted. On some roads the speed limit was not changed. On other roads, including some that never had environmental speed limits, speed limits were raised higher than they were before the environmental speed limits were enacted.

=== 75 mph limits ===
Because Texas law allows 75 mph (121 km/h) speed limits on any numbered state highway, city maintained road, or tollway, it is the only state with 75 mph limits on two-lane roads. Speed studies undertaken by TxDOT in response to legislation passed in 2011 took about 2 years, and the result is that the mileage of highway with a speed limit of 75 mph has increased from about 1,400 to about 19,000. 70 mph or lower speed limits have become unusual on rural Texas roads. Also, there are multiple urban Interstates and tollways in Texas where there is a 75 mph speed limit, such as I-20 in Odessa and Midland (prior to February 2016; it is now 65 mph on I-20 in Odessa-Midland), I-10 in the outer parts of San Antonio, and several managed toll lanes in the DFW area.

=== 80 and 85 mph limits ===
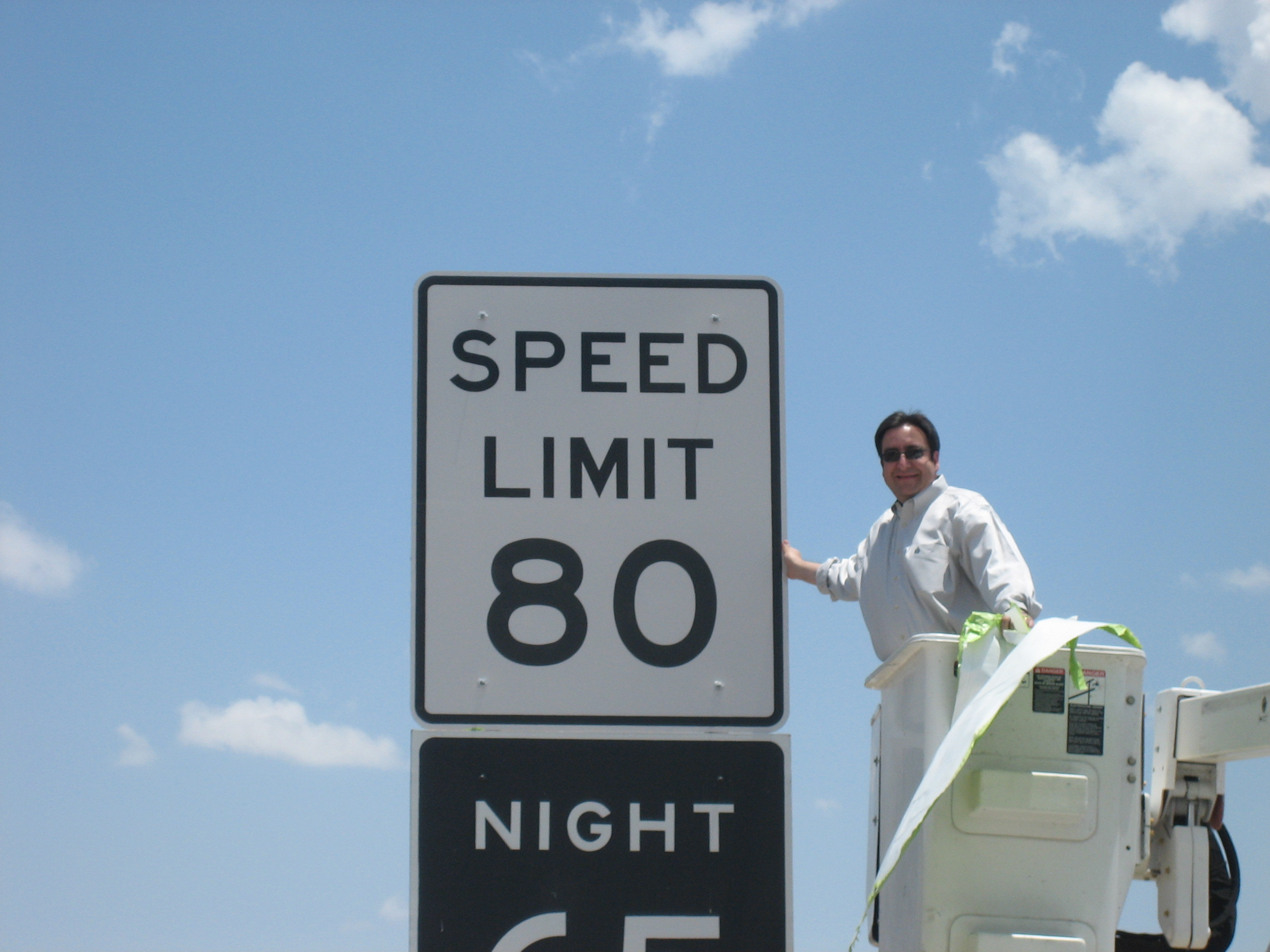
Texas Legislator Pete Gallego unveiling a new 80 mph speed limit sign on Interstate 10 near Fort Stockton, Texas.

Texas statutorily allows 80 mph (129 km/h) speed limits on I-10 and I-20 in certain counties named in the statute, each of which has a low population density. Separately, the Texas Transportation Commission may set a speed limit up to 85 mph (137 km/h) on any part of the state highway system if that part is "designed to accommodate travel at that established speed or a higher speed" and an "engineering and traffic investigation" determines the speed is "reasonable and safe".

As of late 2026, the roads with an 80 mph limit are:

- I-10 between mile 61.8 in Hudspeth County and mile 494 in Kerr County
- I-20 between mile 0 in Reeves County and mile 89 in Ward County.
- State Highway 45 South from the northern junction with US 183 to the southern junction with I-35 in Travis County. SH 45 North from the northern terminus of its concurrency with SH 130 to the northern junction with US 183 near the Travis/Williamson County border remains at 75 mph.
- State Highway 130 from I-35 north of Georgetown to the northern terminus of its concurrency with US-183 south of Austin. However, there is an 85 mph speed limit on a 41-mile (66 km) portion from the northern terminus of its concurrency with US 183 southward to I-10 near Seguin.

== U.S. Virgin Islands ==
For "motorcars, pick-up trucks, or motorcycles", the fastest speed limit in this territory is 55 mph (89 km/h) and is found on one road, the divided highway and freeway known as the Melvin H. Evans Highway on the island of St. Croix. Outside of towns, these vehicles are limited to 35 mph (56 km/h) unless posted lower, except on the above-mentioned divided highway and parts of Centerline Road, which is limited to 40 mph (64 km/h). Within towns, these vehicles are limited to 20 mph (32 km/h).

"Motor trucks and buses" are limited to 40 mph (64 km/h) on St. Croix's main divided highway, 30 mph (48 km/h) on other highways outside of towns, and 15 mph (24 km/h) within towns.

== Utah ==
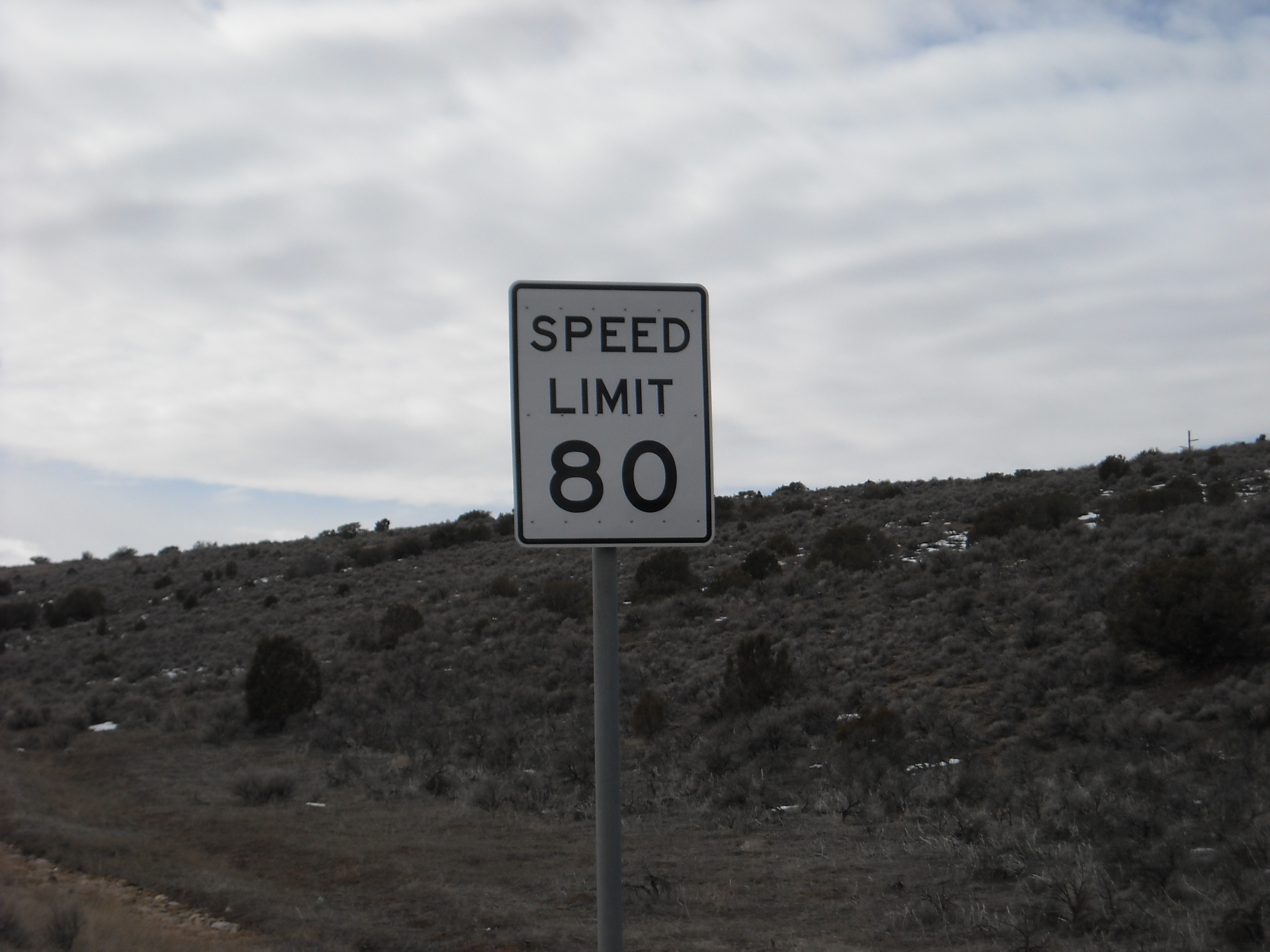
80 mph limit sign on Interstate 15 south of Nephi, Utah

In Utah, there is a minimum speed limit of 45 mph (72 km/h) on Interstate Highways when conditions permit. The maximum speed limit on Interstates is normally 70 mph (113 km/h) in cities and, on most highways, 80 mph (129 km/h) elsewhere. UDOT has now implemented HB83, raising the speed limit to 80 mph on an additional 289 miles (465 km) of rural interstate, including I-80 from Nevada to mile marker 99, I-84 from Idaho to I-15, and I-15 between St. George, Utah and Mona, Utah.

- Although 80 mph is posted on most interstates, some stretches of I-80 and I-84 are posted at 70 mph east of Salt Lake City. I-80 is briefly posted 65 mph/truck speed: 55 between US 40 and Wanship. Speeds between Salt Lake City and Park City on I-80 are variable based on road conditions.
- The speed limit from Ogden to Spanish Fork on I-15 is 70 mph. From Mona south until Cedar City, excluding curvy sections and mountain passes, the speed limit is 80 mph. Excluding a rural break in Iron and Washington counties, the speed limit on I-15 in the urban areas of Washington and St. George is 70 mph until the southern border of Arizona. The speed limit on I-15 in Cedar City is 75 mph.
- The Legacy Parkway, running between North Salt Lake and Farmington, originally had a speed limit of 55 mph (89 km/h) along its entire length due to environmental concerns at the time of its construction. In January 2020, upon expiration of the law requiring the 55 mph limit, it was raised to 65 mph (105 km/h).

=== 80 mph speed limit ===
On April 3, 2013, Utah Department of Transportation spokesman John Gleason said "We’d only do it in a situation that would make sense: flat, straight roadways. The Utah Department of Transportation is looking at expanding zones where it can increase the speed limit from 75 to 80 mph. The Utah State Legislature recently approved a bill allowing for a series of zones to become permanent, as well as expanding them in other places around the state. UDOT began a study on Monday (April 1, 2013) to place more zones on rural parts of I-15, I-80 and I-84. The areas under consideration, UDOT spokesman said, are on I-80 from Grantsville (exit 99) to Wendover, on the Utah-Nevada border; I-84 from Tremonton to the Utah-Idaho border; I-15 from Brigham City (North interchange) to the Utah-Idaho border; and I-15 from Santaquin to North Leeds." The speed limit on these sections has been increased from 80 mph as of September 17, 2013.

On February 13, 2014, UDOT voted to increase the speed limit on I-80 from Salt Lake City across the Bonneville Salt Flats to the Nevada border to 80 mph (129 km/h). The change went into effect on July 1, 2014. By July 1, 2014, the state raised the speed limit on all rural interstates in Utah to 80 mph except I-80 from the Wyoming border to Salt Lake City, on I-84 from its junction with I-80 to Ogden and on twisty sections of Interstate 70 from its I-15 junction to the Colorado border (the speed limit on I-70 still varies between 60 mph and 80 mph depending on the topography of the section of freeway.). The speed limit on every other highway is 55 mph unless otherwise posted, although several two-lane, undivided roads have 65 mph speed limits, with divided sections of U.S. Route 40 and U.S. Route 189 posted at 65 mph as well.

By the end of 2016, UDOT raised speed limits to 80 mph on additional sections of I-15 and I-70.

== Vermont ==
The standard speed limit in Vermont stands at 50 mph (80 km/h). This is applied to rural two-lane roads. On urban freeways, divided at-grade expressways, and rural two-lane limited access roads, the speed limit is 55 mph (89 km/h), such as on I-189 and Interstate 89 in Burlington, and US Route 7 and Vermont State Route 279 outside of Bennington. Rural freeways are posted at 65 mph (105 km/h). Furthermore, the speed limit drops from 65 mph on rural highways to 40 mph (64 km/h) at the approach to the Canada–US border on Interstates 89 and 91, at Highgate and Derby Line, respectively. In school zones, the speed limit can range from 20 mph (32 km/h) to 25 mph (40 km/h), depending on local authority. The minimum speed is defined at 40 mph (64 km/h) only on Interstate highways. That includes where the limit is posted at 55 and 65 mph. However, as old signs are being replaced, the "40 MINIMUM" is being phased out, keeping only "SPEED LIMIT 65".

== Virginia ==
A Virginia statute provides that the default speed limit "shall be 55 mph on interstate highways or other limited access highways with divided roadways, nonlimited access highways having four or more lanes, and all state primary highways." "The maximum speed limit on all other highways shall be 55 miles per hour if the vehicle is a passenger motor vehicle, bus, pickup or panel truck, or a motorcycle, but 45 mph on such highways if the vehicle is a truck, tractor truck, or combination of vehicles designed to transport property, or is a motor vehicle being used to tow a vehicle designed for self-propulsion, or a house trailer."

The same statute contains a number of exceptions, however, allowing higher speed limits "where indicated by lawfully placed signs, erected subsequent to a traffic engineering study and analysis of available and appropriate accident and law-enforcement data". This provision allows speed limits of up to 70 mph (113 km/h) on Interstate highways; multilane, divided, limited-access highways; and express or high-occupancy vehicle lanes if said lanes are physically separated from the regular travel lanes. The statute also allows 60 mph (97 km/h) speed limits on a number of specified non-limited access, multilane, divided highways.

The 70-mph provision was added to Section 46.2-870 via an amendment effective on July 1, 2010. The previous version of the statute had authorized a 70-mph speed limit only on I-85; the maximum limit permitted elsewhere was 65 mph. Notably, the revised statute does not require a 70-mph speed limit on any road nor make such limit automatic, due to the requirement for traffic and engineering studies. The Virginia Department of Transportation began studying Interstate highways with 65-mph speed limits during April 2010 to determine which roads should receive the 70-mph limit and announced that the studies would be conducted in three phases over a period of several months, with the initial phase focusing on 323 miles of highway with "no significant levels of crashes and congestion". As of July 1, 2010, VDOT increased the speed limit to 70 mph on a portion of one highway (I-295 south of I-64). On October 20, 2010, Governor Bob McDonnell announced that by the end of 2010, VDOT would post 70-mph speed limits on 680 miles of Virginia Interstates located outside of urban areas, representing 61 percent of Virginia's total 1,119 miles of Interstate highways. While the statute allows for speed limits up to 70 mph on urban Interstates, as of March 2015 VDOT has declined to post a limit higher than 65 mph on any urban highway other than I-295 in Richmond.

The statute also allows 70-mph speed limits on routes other than Interstates. Initially VDOT declined to consider any such routes for the higher limit, but in early 2012 VDOT posted a 70-mph limit on a portion of US-29 near Lynchburg.

Other Virginia statutes prescribe exceptions to the general rules set forth above. The notable aspect of Virginia's current speed limit laws is that the Department of Transportation has no authority to raise speed limits above the statutory limits unless the General Assembly passes a statute permitting the change. Since the National Maximum Speed Law was repealed in 1995, such statutory exceptions were largely confined to a highway-by-highway basis, as evidenced by the list of 60-mph exceptions in Va. Code § 46.2-870.

Notably, Virginia's reckless driving statute provides that driving 20 mph over the speed limit, or in excess of 85 mph (137 km/h) regardless of the posted speed limit, is grounds for a reckless driving ticket. Thus, in a 70-mph zone traveling 16 mph (since July 2020) over the speed limit is prosecutable as a misdemeanor with penalties of up to a $2,500 fine and/or 1-year imprisonment.

Virginia law does not prescribe a fixed minimum speed limit, although a statute does authorize the posting of such limits where traffic and engineering studies indicate that they would be appropriate.

Virginia is the only state, along with the District of Columbia, that prohibits the use of radar detectors.

== Wake Island ==
The speed limit on Wake Island is 40 mph (64 km/h).

== Washington ==
The Revised Code of Washington permits speed limits of 75 mph (121 km/h) in sections deemed appropriate by an engineering study. As of February 2016, the typical speed limit on a Washington freeway is 70 mph (113 km/h) rural, 60 mph (97 km/h) urban (the speed limits on these types of freeways only vary in the Tri Cities), with a truck speed limit no higher than 60 mph if over 10,000 pounds gross weight. Limits were raised to current speeds following the elimination of the federal 55 mph speed limit, to more closely reflect the common speeds of traffic at that time. There are a wide range of speed limits statewide, due to legislated flexibility for WSDOT in balancing the desire for transportation speed against safety considerations for any particular stretch of highway.

The default speed limit on a rural 2-lane highway in Washington is 60 mph (97 km/h); however, the limit on undivided highways varies. In mountainous country like the Cascades and Olympic Mountains, certain twisty roads are limited to 55 mph (89 km/h), whereas some flat, straight highways in eastern Washington have a limit of 65. The speed limit for motorhomes and autos with trailers is 60 mph, the same limit as trucks. Roads with traffic lights are limited to 55 mph. The school zone speed limit is 20 mph (32 km/h) but is in effect during certain hours or if children are present. Divided highways in Washington are rare, however, U.S. Route 395 between Pasco and Ritzville is a high-speed divided highway with a maximum speed limit of 70 mph (113 km/h).

Some areas within Washington State use variable speed limits such as on portions of I-90 between Seattle and Issaquah and over Snoqualmie Pass.

== West Virginia ==
The speed limit on most rural Interstates is 70 mph (113 km/h). Urban Interstate speed limits generally vary from 55 mph (89 km/h) to 65 mph (105 km/h). Sections of I-64 and I-68 have lower truck speed limits because of steep grades; otherwise, West Virginia does not post separate truck speed limits. The West Virginia Turnpike between Chelyan and Mahan, and I-77 between Princeton and Bluefield has a 60 mph speed limit because of sharp curves.

Speed limits on 4-lane divided highways are normally 65 mph (105 km/h), although some stretches within cities are posted as low as 50 mph (80 km/h). Open country highways have a statutory limit of 55 mph, which includes most rural two-lane highways and even includes some one lane back country roads or any road without a posted speed limit. Cities and towns set their own speed limits, which are usually between 25 mph (40 km/h) and 55 mph (89 km/h). School zones have a statutory speed limit of 15 mph (24 km/h). Speed limits are commonly reduced by 15 mph in work zones.

In 2019 the West Virginia Legislature passed a resolution allowing WVDOT to raise speed limits on interstates to 75 mph based on safety and traffic studies.

== Wisconsin ==
The state of Wisconsin's speed limits are set out in statutory law but may often be modified by the maintaining government entity. In addition to a basic speed rule, Wisconsin law specifies certain occasions where reduced speeds are required including—and not limited to the approaches and traverses of rail crossings, winding roads, roads where people are present, and the crests of grades. Although there is no numeric minimum speed limit, state law prohibits the impediment of traffic by unreasonably slow speeds. Vehicles that lack rubber tires filled with compressed air and/or carry a slow moving vehicle orange safety triangle have a hard limit of 20 mph (32 km/h).

The state of Wisconsin has four default speed limits. 15 mph (24 km/h) limits apply in school zones (on major roads during school arrival and dismissal periods only), near parks with children, and in alleys. 10 mph (16 km/h) default speed limits apply, unless modified by the managing authority, on "service roads" within corporate limits. Within municipal boundaries and in areas of dense urban development a 25 mph (40 km/h) limit is in effect unless another speed limit is indicated. In some rural jurisdictions, such as townships, 35 mph (56 km/h) limit is the default speed limit for residential areas. The entry to such an area is to be marked by speed limit signs. Outside of built-up areas (these include denser business, industrial or residential land uses according to the relevant law) a 55 mph (89 km/h) limit is effective in the absence of other indications.

While all 2 lane roads maintained by WisDOT as of 2015 have a 55 mph (89 km/h) maximum, a small portion of Minnesota State Highway 23 that passes through the state south of Superior but is maintained by MNDOT has a 60 mph (97 km/h) limit through the state.

Along with the aforementioned default speed limits, there are other statutory speed limits that more often require signs to be effective. 70 mph (113 km/h) limits on freeways and 65 mph (105 km/h) limits on expressways require signs to be effective. The default speed limit on these types of roads is 55 mph (89 km/h) as they do not directly interact with the built-up environment. In the densest urban districts a statutory 25 mph (40 km/h) limit is effective when adequate signage is used, as are 35 mph (56 km/h) limits in areas of light development. The same applies to 45 mph (72 km/h) limits on highways designated as "rustic" roads. However, "an alleged failure to post [such a speed limit sign] is not a defense to a prosecution" in the case of such statutory limits.

== Wyoming ==
Wyoming's highest speed limit is 80 mph (129 km/h), found on its Interstate highways, and 70 mph (113 km/h) on its four-lane divided highways. The speed limit for school zones is 20 mph (32 km/h), 30 mph (48 km/h) in urban districts and residential areas, 70 mph for other paved roads, and 55 mph (89 km/h) for unpaved roads. On I-25 in Cheyenne and Casper, the speed limit is 65 mph (105 km/h) and 60 mph (97 km/h) respectively.

In February 2014, the state Assembly passed a bill that would raise the speed limit from 75 to 80 mph (121 to 129 km/h) on certain freeway segments that would meet safety standards. The bill passed the Senate on February 25 and raised the speed limit on certain freeway sections to 80 mph on July 1, 2014. However, an attempt to raise the speed limit to 70 mph (113 km/h) on two-lane highways such as Wyoming 120 and US 14 was turned down that same month, but this same provision became law in February 2015. On February 1, 2016, the speed limit on WY 120 (a two-lane highway) from the Chief Joseph Highway to the Montana border increased to 70 mph. Two other two-lane highway sections, WY 130 from Interstate 80 south to Saratoga and US 85 from east of I-25 to Newcastle, increased to 70 mph.

== See also ==
- Driver License Compact
- Non-Resident Violator Compact
- Solomon curve
- Traffic violations reciprocity
