= Point system (driving) =

Demerit system for traffic and motoring offences

A penalty point system, also known as a demerit point system, is a method used by licensing authorities to monitor and regulate driver behavior. Under such systems, an individual's driver's license accumulates demerit points for traffic offenses (or other infringements committed whilst driving) which last for a set period. The structure and administration of these systems vary between jurisdictions and the authorities enforcing them.

In most cases, the accumulation of points can lead to fines, disqualification, suspension, re-evaluation or revocation of a driver's license. Points are typically recorded by the relevant driver licensing authority, police force, or other authorizing body and may be added or removed in line with jurisdiction-specific rules.

== Description ==
In jurisdictions that use a point system, the police or licensing authorities maintain records of the demerit points issued to each driver. Traffic offenses, such as speeding or disobeying traffic signals, are assigned a designated amount of points. When a driver is found guilty of an offense, the corresponding points are added to their driving record. When a driver's total point number exceeds the prescribed threshold, they may face additional penalties, be required to attend safety or driver-training courses, undergo re-examination, or have their license suspended or revoked.

In some jurisdictions, a subtracting point system is utilized, when drivers begin with a set number of points that are deducted following traffic offenses. The threshold for penalties may vary according to factors such as the driver's experience level, previous record, age, or other circumstances. Generally, it is common for younger or less experienced motorists to be subject to lower thresholds.

In certain systems, points may also be applied if a driver is deemed substantially at fault in a traffic collision. Demerit points can typically be removed through the passage of time without further offenses, or through the successful completion of approved driver-training or traffic-safety courses.

Major traffic offenses, such as hit-and-run or drunk driving, are often handled outside of the point system. Such offenses often carry a mandatory suspension of driving privileges and may incur penalties including imprisonment.

== Jurisdictions that use a point system ==
=== Australia ===
Traffic laws are the responsibility of the Australian state and territory governments. Demerit points schemes have been adopted by all states and territories, and road authorities share information about interstate offenses.

In all states, drivers holding a full, unrestricted license will be disqualified from driving after accumulating 12 demerit points or more within a three-year period, except in New South Wales, where drivers are allowed 13 points in a three-year period. Those who can prove they are professional drivers are allowed an additional point. The license suspension period is three months, plus one further month for every extra four points beyond the threshold, with a cap in most states of five months (for 8 points or more over the threshold; e.g. 20 points or more on a full license). As an alternative to accepting immediate suspension, a driver can apply for a "good behavior" period of 12 months. In most states, drivers under a good behavior period who accumulate one or two further points (except in Victoria, which does not allow any further offenses) have their license suspended for double the original period. Most states also provide for immediate suspension of a license, instead of or in addition to demerit points, in certain extreme circumstances. These include offenses for driving under the influence (DUI) of alcohol or other drugs, or for greatly excessive speed.

==== New South Wales ====
In New South Wales, provisional license holders are allowed to incur different numbers of points, depending on their license class, before their license is suspended for three months. Holders of a P-1 license, which lasts 12–18 months (which can be renewed), can incur 4 points, and P-2 license holders can incur 7 points in a 24- to 30-month period (which can be renewed). Speeding offenses for provisional license holders incur 4 points, meaning that P-1 holders will be suspended after one speeding offence of any speed. During holiday periods, double demerit points apply for speeding, seat-belt and helmet-related offenses.

Offenses in school zones attract more points than in other areas. Automatic suspensions apply for all drink- and drug-driving offences, as well as speeding by more than 30 km/h. The New South Wales Government has established a task-force to investigate and prevent the illegal sale of demerit points on Facebook Marketplace.

==== Victoria ====
===== Demerit points =====
Victoria introduced a demerit points system in 1970. Learner and probationary drivers who accumulate five or more points within 12 months must either accept a three-month license suspension or enter a 12-month "good behavior" bond. Any further point during the bond period results in a six-month suspension. Fully licensed drivers may accumulate up to 12 points over three years and are offered the same bond option.

Traffic offenses and their associated points are listed in Schedule 3 of the Road Safety (Drivers) Regulations 2009.

===== Drunk driving =====
Drunk-driving offenses can result in immediate license cancellation for fully licensed drivers with a blood alcohol concentration (BAC) of 0.10 or higher, and for learner or probationary drivers with a BAC of 0.07 or higher.

Since 30 April 2018, all drunk-driving convictions result in license suspension, and re-licensing requires the installation of an alcohol interlock device. These requirements also apply to drivers who refuse a breath or blood test and to those who fail a roadside drug test.

===== Speeding offences =====
Drivers face an automatic license suspension of at least three months for travelling more than 25 km/h over the speed limit or at any speed above 130 km/h. Since 1 November 2018, excessive speeding offenses no longer attract demerit points and instead result in immediate suspension.

From 12 November 2020, immediate suspension and vehicle impounding apply for extreme speeding offenses, including speeds 45 km/h or more over the limit or 145 km/h or more in a 110 km/h zone. Similar powers apply to serious offenses where a vehicle is used in a manner that causes death or injury.

===== Double demerit points =====
Unlike some other states, Victoria does not apply double demerit point periods

==== South Australia ====
In South Australia, if a traffic offense is committed against the Road Traffic Act 1961 or the Australian Road Rules 1999, points may be incurred against a driver's license. The number of points incurred depends on the offense and how likely it is to cause a crash. If 12 or more points are accumulated in any 3-year period, a driver will be disqualified from holding or obtaining a driver's license or permit. Each 3-year period is calculated based on the dates that offense were committed.

If a driver accumulates:

- 12 to 15 points, a driver loses their permission to drive for 3 months.
- 16 to 20 points, a driver loses their permission to drive for 4 months.
- 20 points or more, a driver loses their permission to drive for 5 months.

Demerit points are incurred whether the offence is committed in South Australia or interstate.

===== Northern Territory =====
A demerit points scheme was introduced into the Northern Territory on 1 September 2007. Offenses that accrue points include speeding, failing to obey a red traffic light or level crossing signal, failing to wear a seat-belt, drunk driving, using a mobile phone, failure to display L or P plates, street racing, burnouts and causing damage. Learner and provisional drivers are subject to suspension for accumulating 5 points or more over a 12-month period. The 3-year limit of 12 points still applies.

===== Queensland =====
In Queensland, provisional or learner drivers may accumulate up to 4 demerit points in a one-year period, and open license holders 12 demerit points in a three-year period, before receiving a sanction. A driver who exceeds their point threshold may choose between a license suspension for a period of 3 months, or to enter into a 12-month good driving behavior bond. If a driver incurs more than one point while subject to a good driving behavior bond, their license is suspended for a period of 6 months.

Unlike in some other states, double demerit points apply all year round in Queensland for specific offenses, where a second or subsequent same offense is committed within 12 months of the earlier offense – for example, a driver with a full/open license caught using a phone while driving would receive 4 demerit points for the first offense; if caught for the same offense within 12 months of committing the first, they would accrue a further 8 demerit points (4x for the offense, 4x double), resulting in their demerit point limit being reached.

=== Europe ===
==== Bulgaria ====
Bulgaria has implemented a penalty point system with a total of 34 points, introduced in 1999. In 2017, this was increased to 39 points.

==== Denmark ====
Denmark has a penalty point system that penalizes drivers with a klip ("cut/stamp") for certain traffic violations. The term klip refers to a klippekort ("punch card ticket"). If a driver with a non-probationary license accumulates three penalty points, then police conditionally suspend the driver's license. To get a new license, suspended drivers must pass both written and practical drivers examinations. Drivers who have been suspended and first-time drivers must avoid collecting two penalty points for a three-year probationary period; if the driver has not accumulated any penalty points, then the driver is allowed an extra penalty point so they can have three maximum. Penalty points are deleted from the police database three years after they were assessed. Police can also unconditionally ban people from driving.

==== France ====
France uses a subtracting points system (permis à points) for drivers, in use since 1992. Drivers are allotted a balance of twelve points associated with their driver's license (permis de conduire), (six points for new permits) as a baseline balance to start out with. As they commit infractions of the driving code, they may accumulate a punishment in the form of removal of one or more points, depending on the seriousness of the infraction. Maximum removal of points for one event is six points, eight if multiple infractions are involved.

The theory behind it, is that by giving each driver an initial point balance (capital de points initial} at the outset, they will be motivated to keep it by driving safely so as not to lose their initial capital of points allotted to them. When drivers receive their first permit, they enter into a probationary period of three years. The first year, then are allotted six points. They accrue two more points for each full year of driving without an infraction. After the third year, probation is over, and they will have accumulated twelve points if there has been no infraction.

If an infraction is committed during the probationary period, points accrual is capped until the end of probation. Any lost points caused by the infraction may be recovered after six months of good driving conduct, but stops at the cap. The driving permit remains valid as long as points remain on the license. If all points are lost, the license becomes invalid, and the driver must wait six months and then reapply for a driver's license after passing medical and psychological tests, and taking the written test again. If the license becomes invalid during the probationary period, the candidate must pass written and driving test. If the candidate succeeds in obtaining their license again, they enter the three-year probationary period once again. After three years of no lost points, the point balance rises to twelve points again. If points are lost, there are some methods of recovering them sooner, such as by attending a voluntary driver education workshop.

==== Germany ====
The Federal Motor Transport Authority of Germany (Kraftfahrt-Bundesamt) located in Flensburg, operates an 8-point system for committed traffic offences. This system was introduced in May 2014, replacing the previous 18-points system that dates back to 1974. Colloquially, these points are usually referred as "Punkte in Flensburg" (Points in Flensburg). They expire after 2.5 to 10 years, depending on the type and severity of each offence. Under certain circumstances, points can be reduced by attending formal training events. Obtaining 8 or more points will result in a revocation of the driving license; once revoked, the licenses will only be reinstated after a Medical-psychological assessment following the ban.

==== Ireland ====
In the Republic of Ireland, twelve points accrued results in six months' disqualification. 38 regulatory offences notified by post incur 1-2 point penalties on payment of a fine. 10 more serious offences require a mandatory court appearance and incur 3-5 point penalties. The most serious offences are outside the penalty point system and incur automatic driving bans, and in some cases imprisonment.

==== Italy ====
In Italy, the driver has 20 points by default, and receives a bonus of 2 points for every 2 years of correct behavior, with a maximum of 30 points. Each traffic violation incurs a specific point penalty (for example, ignoring a traffic light involves a penalty of 6 points). If the driver loses all points, the driving license is revoked. In case of the second alcohol abuse in 2 years, the driving license will be revoked. A suspension is effective from when the driver is personally served with the suspension notice and they must surrender their driving license to the person giving them the notice.

==== Netherlands ====
Since March 30, 2002, The Netherlands has a point system for starting drivers (5 years starting from the moment a driver first passed a driving test, or 7 years if they passed before reaching the age of 18). A driver reaching 2 points in 5 years will lose the driving license and has to pass a driving test again in order to be regain the license. On October 1, 2014, this limit was lowered from 3 to 2 points. Drivers can get a point for:

- Dangerous behavior in traffic,
- Causing an accident resulting in death or injury
- Tailgating
- Exceeding the speed limit by more than 40 km/h (motorways), or 30 km/h (all other roads)
- Any violation of the law which resulted in injury or damage

Some of these violations could also directly result in loss of the license. However, when a driver has 2 points, the license is automatically revoked and a driving test has to be passed again, whereas normally, the violation would only result in the license being suspended for several months. However, in Dutch media, the effectiveness has been doubted, it was said that points were being given but not always correctly registered.

==== Norway ====
In Norway, the system is called "prikkbelastning", with prikk(er) meaning point(s). Points are assessed to a driver's license for traffic violations which do not by themselves result in immediate revocation of the license.

After July 1, 2011, the normal penalty for most traffic violations, such as failing to yield or failing to stop at red lights, is three points in addition to the fine. Speeding violations of between 10 and 15 km/h (where the speed limit is 60 km/h or less) or between 15 and 20 km/h (where the speed limit is 70 km/h or more) result in two points; for speeding violations below this no points are assessed. Young drivers between 18 and 20 are penalized with twice the number of points. A driver reaching 8 points in three years loses his or her driving license for 6 months. Each point is deleted when three years have passed since the violation took place. When the driving privileges are restored after the six-month ban, the points which caused the suspension are deleted.

==== United Kingdom ====
Total points per year (Britain)
Year	Total points	References and notes
2021	2,803,432	Affected by COVID-19
2022	7,329,228	
2023	8,545,646	
2024	9,610,237	
Average	7,322,136	2021-2024

===== England and Wales =====
In England and Wales, penalty points are given by courts for some of the traffic offences listed in Schedule 2 of the Road Traffic Offenders Act 1988. Where points are given, the minimum is 3 points for some lesser offences and the maximum 11 points for the most serious offences; some incidents can result in points being given for multiple offences or for multiple occurrences of the same offence (typically for having more than one defective tyre); the majority of applicable offences attract 3 or more penalty points. The giving of points is obligatory for most applicable offences, but the number of points, and the giving of points for some of several offences, can be discretionary. Points remain on the driver's record, and an endorsement is made upon the driver's license for four years from conviction (eleven years for drink- and drug-related convictions). 12 points on the license within 3 years make the driver liable to disqualification; however this is not automatic, and must be decided by a law court. The ban will typically lasts for 6 months.

Since the introduction of the Road Traffic (New Drivers) Act 1995, if a person, in the 2 years after passing their first practical test, accumulates 6 points, their license is revoked by the DVLA. The driver has to reapply and pay for a provisional driver's license, drive as a learner, and pay for and take the theory and practical tests before receiving a full license again. This is not, however, a disqualification; the driver may immediately reapply for a provisional license. In the case of egregious offences, the court may order the driver to pass an extended driving test before the license is returned, even beyond the 2-year probation period.

Since 11 October 2004, there has been mutual recognition of driver disqualification arising from the penalty points given in England and Wales (and/or Scotland) with Northern Ireland; before that date, disqualification in England and Wales would only have extended to Scotland by virtue of the driver registration system covering only Great Britain.

===== Northern Ireland =====
In Northern Ireland the driver registration system is separate from that of Great Britain with different laws covering penalty points and the offences to which they apply. In other respects, the application of the system is similar to that in England and Wales. Offences to which points apply are indicated in Schedule 1 of the Road Traffic Offenders (Northern Ireland) Order 1996.

===== Scotland =====
Road traffic laws are mostly shared with, or similar to those of, England and Wales, although Scotland is a separate jurisdiction. The driver registration system currently covers all of Great Britain, and the Road Traffic Offenders Act 1988 currently governs the penalty points system in Scotland. The main differences in the penalty points provisions of the 1988 Act are the theft and homicide offences attracting penalty points indicated in Schedule 2 Part II ("Other Offences"), which are not common between Scots Law and English Law.

=== Canada ===
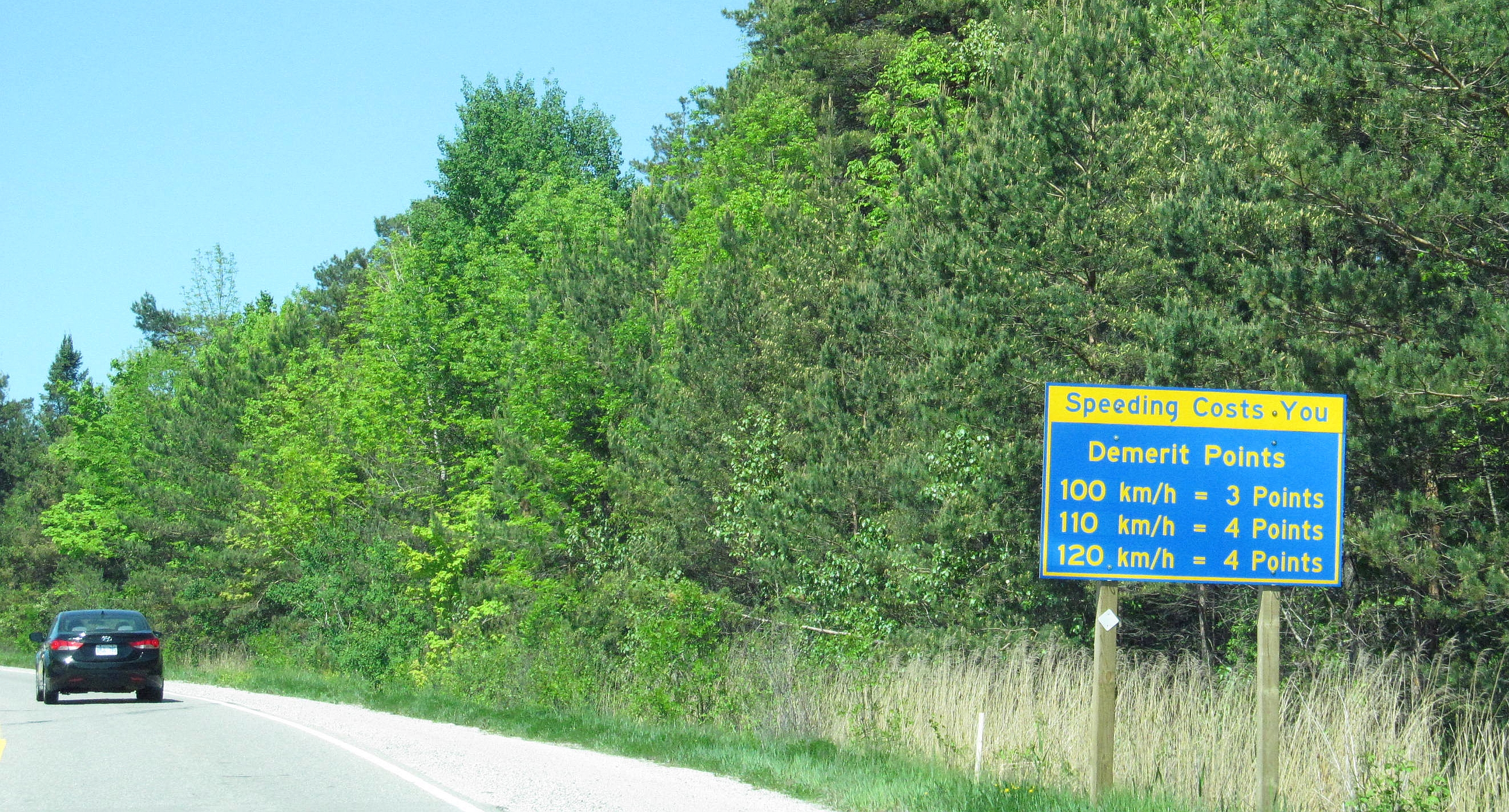
Warning sign in Ontario, Canada

==== Alberta ====
In Alberta, when a driver accumulates 15 or more points within a two-year period, their license is automatically suspended for one month.

==== Ontario ====
Ontario uses a 15-point system where points are "added" to a driver's record following a conviction, though Ontario's point system is not entirely related to safe driving behaviour (a lone driver using a high-occupancy vehicle lane in Ontario will earn three demerit points). The amount of points given for a violation range from 2 points for minor offences such as improper turns and failing to signal to 7 points for the most major offences: failing to remain at the scene of a collision and failing to stop when signaled or asked by a police officer. Fully-licensed drivers who reach 15 points or higher will have their license suspended for 30 days. Following the suspension, fully-licensed drivers will have their points decreased to 7, with the points disappearing altogether after 2 years. Ontario drivers guilty of certain driving offences in other Canadian provinces, as well as the U.S. States of New York and Michigan, will see demerit points added to their driving record just as if the offence happened in Ontario.

==== New Brunswick ====
New Brunswick uses a 10-point system where points are "removed" from a driver's record following a conviction, when a driver reaches 0 points they lose their license. New drivers begin with only 4 points on their license and gain two additional points each year of safe driving to a maximum of 10 points. For example; if a driver is caught driving while distracted while using a cell phone or GPS in New Brunswick, they will be fined as well as lose 3 points from their license. If they (or any passengers under the age of 16) are caught not wearing a seatbelt in New Brunswick, they will be fined as well as lose 2 points from their license.

=== United States ===
The point system is applied in different ways depending on state, with some not using it at all. If a red light running traffic violation is captured by a red light camera, no points are assessed. Aspects of a motorist's driving record (including points) may be reported to insurance companies, who may use them in determining what rate to charge the motorist, and whether to renew or cancel an insurance policy.

==== Arizona ====
Arizona uses a point system where a license will be suspended if 8 points are accumulated in one year. Offenses that lead to this are the following:

- DUI (blood alcohol concentration (BAC) of 0.08% or higher): 8 points
- Extreme DUI: 8 points
- Reckless driving: 8 points
- Aggressive driving: 8 points
- Leaving the scene of an accident: 6 points
- Running a stop sign or traffic signal or failing to yield, accident causing death: 6 points
- Running a stop sign or traffic signal or failing to yield, accident causing serious injury: 4 points
- Speeding: 3 points
- Driving or parking over area where one or more lanes diverge to go in different directions (gore area): 3 points
- All other driving violations: 2 points

There are other offenses that can count toward this (e.g. HOV lane misuse is a 3-point offense)

==== California ====
In California, drivers who accumulate tickets for moving violations may be considered negligent operators and can lose their driving privilege. Major offenses, such as hit and run, reckless driving, and driving under the influence (DUI), earn 2 points and remain on record for 13 years. Less serious offenses earn 1 point which remain for 39 months (3 years, 3 months).

A driver is considered negligent if they accumulate:

- 4 points in 12 months
- 6 points in 24 months
- 8 points in 36 months
- Suspension or revocation by Department of Motor Vehicles (DMV)

When a driver is cited for a traffic violation, the judge may offer the driver the opportunity to attend a Traffic Violator School, this would include any online traffic school if the court allows. Drivers may participate once in any 18-month period to have a citation dismissed from their driving record this way. Upon dismissal of the citation, all record of the citation is removed and no points are accumulated. Regardless of the number of points accumulated, many serious offenses involving a vehicle are punishable by heavy fines or imprisonment.

==== Colorado ====
Colorado uses an accumulating point system according to the Colorado Division of Motor Vehicles Point Schedule. For each conviction of a traffic violation or driving charge, in accordance with the Drivers License Point System, the court notifies the Division of Motor Vehicles (DMV) of the conviction and a certain amount of points is assessed to a driver's license record. A conviction occurs when a driver pleads guilty to a charge, are found guilty at trial, mail in a penalty assessment fine amount, or fail to appear in court, in some cases. Suspension of driving privileges can result from as few as 6 points in 12 months by a driver under 18 years old. Points remain on the driver's motor vehicle record for 7 years. Some motor vehicle offenses carry 12 points per incident, which could result in immediate suspension of the drivers license. Multiple traffic violation convictions can also result in a suspension of the drivers license if a sufficient number of points are accumulated during a 12- or 24-month period.

==== Florida ====
Florida uses a point system similar to that of Colorado. The Florida Department of Highway Safety and Motor Vehicles is the department responsible for the issuance of Driver's Licenses in the state and will also track points issued to drivers who are licensed within the state. The following are point values assigned for the following infractions.

Speeding

- 14 mph (23 km/h) or less over the speed limit – 3 points
- 15 mph (24 km/h) or more over the speed limit – 4 points
- Speeding which results in a crash – 6 points (enacted to curtail street drag racing)

Moving violations

- Moving violation (includes driving during restricted hours and parking on a highway outside the limits of a municipality) – 3 points
- Moving violation resulting in a car crash – 4 points
- Failing to stop at a traffic signal – 4 points
- Passing a stopped school bus – 4 points
- Reckless driving – 4 points
- Leaving the scene of a crash resulting in property damage of more than US$50 – 6 points
- Improper lane change – 3 points
- Violation of a traffic control sign/device – 4 points
- Open container as an operator – 3 points
- Child restraint violation – 3 points
- Littering – 3 points
- Violation of curfew – 3 points (a licensed driver who is under the age of 17 may not operate a motor vehicle between 11:00 p.m. and 6:00 a.m., unless accompanied by a driver who is 21 years of age or older and holds a valid driver license, or the operator is driving to or from work. A licensed driver who is 17 years of age may not operate a motor vehicle between 1:00 a.m. and 5:00 a.m., unless accompanied by a driver who is 21 years of age or older and holds a valid driver license, or the operator is driving to and from work.)

Any person who collects a certain number of points within a given time frame will have their license automatically revoked by the state for the length of time listed.

- 12 points earned within 12 months results in a 30-day suspension.
- 18 points earned within 18 months results in a 3-month suspension.
- 24 points earned within 36 months results in a 12-month suspension.

Any driver under the age of 18 who accumulates six or more points within a 12-month period is automatically restricted for one year to driving for business purposes only. If additional points are accumulated the restriction is extended for 90 days for every additional point received.

If a driver license was suspended in the state of Florida for points or as a habitual (but not DUI) traffic offender, or by court order, the holder must complete an advanced driver improvement course before driving privileges are reinstated.

Points issued against a driver's license in Florida remain on the license for at least 10 years.

The state of Florida issues its citizens points against their driver's license for infractions occurring anywhere in the United States.

==== Massachusetts ====
In Massachusetts, the points system is known as the Safe Driver Insurance Plan (SDIP). This encourages safe driving with lower premiums for drivers who do not cause accidents or commit traffic violations, and by ensuring that high-risk drivers pay a greater share of insurance costs. The points are accumulated over a six-year period and reduced for sustained periods of safe driving.

The number of surcharge points assigned to each surchargeable incident is determined by the incident classification defined in the Safe Driver Insurance Plan:

- Minor traffic law violation – 2 points
- Minor at-fault accident – 3 points
- Major at-fault accident – 4 points
- Major traffic law violation – 5 points

The incident count is the number of surchargeable incidents. However, if more than one surcharge comes from one incident, it only counts as one surchargeable incident.

==== New Jersey ====
The Motor Vehicle Commission of New Jersey has a point system. If the motorist receives 6 points or more within a period 3 years or more, they will be forced to pay a surcharge annually for three years, which does include court fees and other penalties. If 12 points or more are accumulated on the motorist's license, then their license will be suspended. Other offenses that lead to automatic suspension of the motorist's license are the following:

- Driving while intoxicated (DWI)
- Operating a vehicle without a license
- Driving a vehicle without insurance
- Failure to pay child support
- Failure to make a court-ordered appearance
- Drug-related charges.
- Drinking alcohol if under the age of 21

The points range from 2 to 8 points, depending on the severity of the offense. Red light camera violations are not worth any points. The motorists can deduct points from their driving records. 3 points may be deducted one year after either the motorist's last moving violation and no violations for at least one year before. The motorist must also complete an approved driver improvement program. 2 points may be deducted if the motorist completes a defensive driving course. However, the motorist may receive point reductions every five years for every course they take.

==== New York ====
Under the New York points system, a driving license is suspended after 11 points or 3 speeding tickets are accumulated in 18 months. Points are counted from the date of the incident (usually the date of the ticket) rather than the date of conviction. After a driver accrues 6 or more points in an 18-month period they will be fined a "NY driver responsibility assessment fee" of $100 per year for 3 years, plus an additional $25 per year for each additional point received. This means 1 extra point costs $75 (since the assessment lasts for 3 years).

For out-of-state offenses, New York State Department of Motor Vehicles does not record point violations, with the exception of violations from Quebec and Ontario.

==== North Carolina ====
North Carolina operates two parallel point systems: one for DMV license suspension purposes and one for insurance purposes (the "Safe Driver Incentive Plan").

The DMV point system assigns 1 to 5 points to noncommercial driver's licenses upon conviction or an admission of guilt for most moving violations; non-moving violations carry no points. A driver's license is suspended for 60 days on the first suspension if twelve points are assessed against the license within a three-year period. Serious offenses, such as DUI and excessive speeding (more than 15 mph over the limit at a traveled speed of greater than 55 mph), result in an immediate suspension on conviction. Points are not assessed for up to two granted Prayers for Judgment Continued (PJC) within a five-year period, though some serious offenses (such as DUI, passing a stopped school bus, and speeding in excess of 25 mph over the posted speed limit) are ineligible for grant of a PJC.

The insurance point system assigns points differently, assigning 1–12 points to each case of at-fault accidents and moving violations. Rather than using the points for a license suspension, these points lead to insurance surcharges of approximately 15-40% per point assessed. Notably, points are assessed for insurance purposes even if the license is suspended. Only points within the three to five years preceding the policy purchase date are considered (depending on the number of points assessed for the incident), and a single PJC per household within a five-year period does not result in insurance points assigned.

Incidents from out-of-state are treated as though they occurred in North Carolina for point assessment purposes under both systems.

==== Pennsylvania ====
The Pennsylvania Department of Transportation (PennDOT) has a point system that follows:

If the motorist accumulates 6 or more points on their license, they are in danger of losing their license. If the motorist is under 18 years of age and has 6 points or more on their license or receives a ticket for speeding 26 miles (or more) over the posted speed limit, then their license will be suspended. For every one-year period (from the date of the most recent violation) that a motorist has no point related violations, PennDOT will remove a maximum of 3 points from their record.

Violations range from 2 to 5 points (possibly with a mandatory departmental hearing), depending on the severity of the offense. PennDOT has the right to immediately suspend a motorist's license if any one of the following occurs:

- DUI (One-year suspension)
- Speeding 31 miles over the posted speed limit (15-day suspension)
- Accumulating 11 or more points on their license
- Causing the death of another due to the motorist's fault

Point system suspensions are as follows:

- First suspension: 5 days per point
- Second suspension: 10 days per point
- Third suspension: 15 days per point
- All subsequent suspensions: 1 year

==== South Carolina ====
In South Carolina, if a motorist has six or more points on his/her driving record, a warning letter will be sent to the motorist's home address. If the motorist accumulates 12 or more points, then the license will be suspended. Motorists may reduce their points by taking a Defensive Driving Course. This course cannot be taken online and it must be taken in the state of South Carolina. In addition, the course must be taken after the motorist has been assessed points on his/her license. However, point reductions may be made within a three-year period. If by any chance the motorist's license is in danger of being suspended, the course must be taken prior to the suspension start time. The points range from 2 to 6 points, depending on the severity of the offense. If a motorist receives a ticket for a DUI, then the license is automatically suspended.

=== South America ===
==== Brazil ====
In Brazil, all traffic violations incur a certain number of demerit points, depending on their severity, according to the 1997 Brazilian Traffic Code. If a driver accumulates more than 20 points (5 points for provisional drivers), the driving license is suspended and the driver has to take a traffic education course in order to regain the right (privilege) to drive. However, some infractions incur in immediate license suspension regardless of current point tally, such as drunk driving, engaging in street racing and others. It is also notable that many offenses that only apply to pedestrians also incur in demerit points.

Infraction	Points	Examples
Light	3 points	Driving while using a mobile phone
Medium	4 points	Parking where it is not allowed, Stopping on a crosswalk or intersection
Severe	5 points	Not wearing a seatbelt, Failure to signal before turning or changing lanes, Speeding
Very Severe	7 points	Disrespecting traffic lights, Driving a vehicle without the appropriate license, Excessive Speeding

=== Caribbean ===
==== Trinidad and Tobago ====
The Motor Vehicle and Road Traffic Bill 2016, which was launched in September 2019, governs the points system, which is referred to as the Demerit Points System.

Drivers holding a permit for over a year may have their driving license suspended if they receive more than 10 points within a three-year period.

- Drivers who receive 10-14 points (over three years) can be disqualified from holding or obtaining a driving permit for a period of six months.
- Drivers who receive 14-20 points (over three years) can be disqualified from holding or obtaining a driving permit for up to one year.
- Drivers who receive over 20 points (over three years) can be disqualified from holding or obtaining a driving permit for up to two years.

Drivers can receive point by the following offenses:

- Using a wireless communication device to view, send or compose an electronic message while driving or having charge of a vehicle carries a fixed penalty fine of $1,000 and the award of six demerit points.
- Driving while disqualified from holding or obtaining a driving permit will see the award of 14 demerit points
- Offences of driving instructor carries a fine of $2000 and nine demerit points
- Exceeding the specified speed limit by 31 km or more per hour carries a fixed penalty fine of $3000 and six demerit points
- Motor racing and speed trials between motor vehicles without permission carries a $1000 and six demerit points
- Driving when under the influence of drug will attract nine demerit points
- Driving or being in charge of a vehicle while blood alcohol levels exceed prescribed limit – nine demerit points
- Failure to provide a specimen of breath or blood – 14 demerit points
- Failure to submit breath analysis or willful alternation of concentration of alcohol in his breath or blood – 14 demerit points
- Careless driving – six demerit points
- Failure to produce a vehicle for inspection/Driving a vehicle without a valid inspection sticker and certificate – $1000 fine – six demerit points
- Use of Priority Bus Route by unauthorized vehicle – $2000, six demerit points

It can take up to two years for points to be expunged from a driver's record, but points expire a year after the date of the violation.

== Other jurisdictions ==
The following jurisdictions also apply point systems:

- People's Republic of China – see also Road Traffic Safety Law of the People's Republic of China
- Republic of China (Taiwan)
- France
- Hong Kong
- Malaysia – see also KEJARA System
- Morocco
- New Zealand
- Philippines
- Serbia
- Singapore
- Slovenia
- Spain
- Poland

== See also ==
- Driver's license
- Traffic ticket
- Traffic violations reciprocity
