= PJC =

PJC may refer to:

- Pacific Jewish Center, synagogue in Venice, CA
- Police and Judicial Co-operation in Criminal Matters, a pillar of the European Union
- Pensacola Junior College, in Florida, USA
- Pioneer Junior College, in Singapore
- Paris Junior College, in Paris, Texas
- Pedro Juan Caballero Airport, in Pedro Juan Caballero, Paraguay; IATA code PJC
- Prayer for Judgement Continued, a legal plea used in certain U.S. states
- Premature junctional contraction (medicine), a premature beat originating at the AV node of the heart.
- Princeton Junction station, New Jersey, Amtrak station code PJC
- Pan American Judo Confederation
- Zelienople Municipal Airport, FAA code: PJC
- Jean Coutu Group (PJC), Canadian drugstore
  - Brooks Pharmacy, trade name of Jean Coutu Group (PJC) USA, its former US subsidiary
