= Selective enforcement =

Power to choose whether or how to punish a person who has violated the law

In law, selective enforcement occurs when government officials (such as police officers, prosecutors, or regulators) exercise discretion, which is the power to choose whether or how to punish a person who has violated the law. The biased use of enforcement discretion, such as that based on racial prejudice or corruption, is usually considered a legal abuse and a threat to the rule of law.

This concept is closely related to prosecutorial discretion. There is a divide between countries where prosecutions are inherently discretionary (known as the opportunity principle) and where prosecutions are mandatory (known as the legality principle). In addition, in some countries prosecutors operate independently with more discretion vs in a hierarchical system that require more conformity.

In some cases, selective enforcement may be desirable. For example, a verbal warning to a teenager may effectively alter their behavior without resorting to legal punishment and with the added benefit of reducing governmental legal costs. In other cases, selective enforcement may be inevitable. For example, it may be impractical for police officers to issue traffic tickets to every driver they observe exceeding the speed limit, so they may have no choice but to limit action to the most flagrant examples of reckless driving.

The dangers of selective enforcement lie in its potential to undermine the fundamental principles of justice and equality. When laws are enforced inconsistently, it can lead to arbitrary outcomes, favoritism, and unequal treatment under the law. Individuals from marginalized communities may face harsher penalties, while others escape accountability due to their social status or connections.

== United States ==
In the United States, the principle of discretion grants public prosecutors and police significant latitude in deciding whether to charge someone with a crime and which charges to file. Therefore, the mere fact that a law is selectively enforced against one person and not against another, absent bias or pattern of enforcement against a constitutionally-protected class is not illegal.

=== Immigration law ===
Selective enforcement has become a topic of great discussion in the illegal immigration debate. The 2011 "Morton Memo" laid out enforcement priorities for the U.S. Immigration and Customs Enforcement, and was intended to channel limited resources into prioritized pursuit of cases involving criminals and felons. It was interpreted as the waiver of active prosecution of non-criminal illegal aliens and the exclusive focus on criminal illegal aliens. Enforcement priorities were further defined by the Deferred Action for Childhood Arrivals program, which started in 2012. This uses the executive branch's discretionary authority to grant certain people who were illegally brought to the United States as minors the temporary authorization to live and work in the United States.

== See also ==
- Selective prosecution
- Sentencing disparity
- Prosecutorial discretion
- Equality before the law
- Ticket fixing
- Two-tier policing
