= Three-way junction =

Type of road intersection with three arms

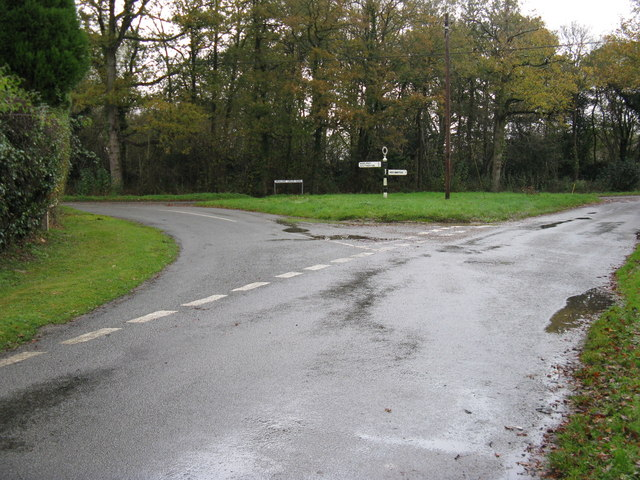
Three way junction at Dragons Green - geograph.org.uk - 1578998

A three-way junction (or three-way intersection) is a type of road intersection with three arms. A Y junction (or Y intersection) generally has three arms of equal size coming at an acute or obtuse angle to each other; while a T junction (or T intersection) also has three arms, but one of the arms is generally a smaller road joining a larger road at right angle.

== Right-of-way ==
Some three-way junctions are controlled by traffic lights, while others rely upon drivers to obey right-of-way rules, which vary from place to place:

- In some jurisdictions, chiefly in European countries except the UK and Ireland, a driver is always obliged to yield right-of-way for every vehicle oncoming from the right at a junction without traffic signals and priority signs (including T junctions).
- In other jurisdictions (mainly in the UK, USA, Australia and Taiwan), a driver turning in a three-way junction must yield for every vehicle approaching the junction (on the way straight ahead) and, if the driver turns right in left-hand traffic/left in right-hand traffic, for every vehicle turning without crossing the oncoming traffic's side of the road (left in left-hand traffic/right in right-hand traffic) or (if two vehicles both turn right in left-hand traffic) for the right-turning vehicle approaching from the left/(if two vehicles both turn left in right-hand traffic) the left-turning vehicle approaching from the right (and a road going straight ahead at a three-way junction is normally marked as a priority road).

In the United States and some other countries, it is common to have stop signs facing each direction, although according to game-theoretical analysis, drivers have strong incentives to run the stop sign, while randomly removing one stop sign may lead to significant efficiency gains.

In the People's Republic of China, going straight on red when approaching a T junction on the main road with the intersecting road on the left was permitted until the Road Traffic Safety Law of the People's Republic of China took effect on 1 May 2004.

== Turns ==
When one road at a 3-way junction has a higher traffic volume than the other (and particularly when the roads are perpendicular to each other), turns are characterized as "right-in", "right-out", "left-in" and "left-out". A turn "in" represents a turn from the major road into the minor road. A turn "out" represents a turn out of the minor road onto the major road. A 3-way junction allowing all four of these turns is characterized as "full-movement". These terms also apply to turns between roads and driveways.

== Variations ==
An experiment was done in Illinois, United States, to allow going straight on red (like a right turn on red) when approaching a T junction on the main road, with the intersecting road on the left. It was a failure. However, at some T junctions where the main road includes at least two lanes on the side away from the intersecting road, the farthest (rightmost, in areas where traffic drives to the right) lane is given the right of way to proceed straight through the intersection at all times, denoted by a "green arrow" signal if a traffic light is installed at the intersection.

In such cases, often that lane is also specially delimited with pavement markings or other lane separation devices, to keep left-turning traffic on the intersecting road from colliding with traffic proceeding through the intersection on the main road. There are now safer variations of this, called continuous green-T (or seagull) intersections, that have a left turn lane off the main road either channelized or otherwise separated from traffic going straight, which allows for a traffic signal on only one side of the road.

== Superstitious beliefs ==
In Thailand, three-way junction was called in an old word Sam Phraeng (Thai: สามแพร่ง, pronounced [sǎːm pʰrɛ̂ŋ]). Sam Phraeng is unsuitable area according to the beliefs of Thai people since ancient times on account of it is a passageway of ghosts or demons; therefore, normally no one will build a house or residence in the Sam Phraeng area. This belief also appears in China, Japan, and Korea.

== Image gallery ==
T Intersection Sign in Taiwan with no more road straight ahead

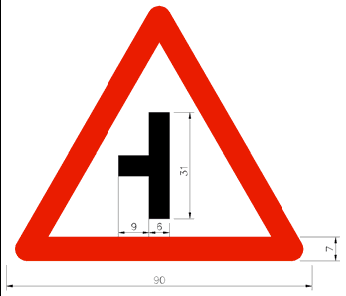
T Intersection Sign in Taiwan with side road on the left

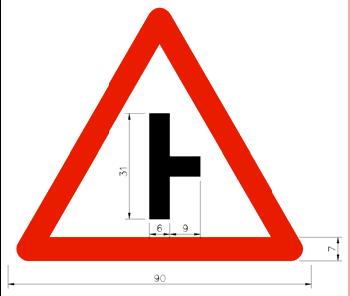
T Intersection Sign in Taiwan with side road on the right

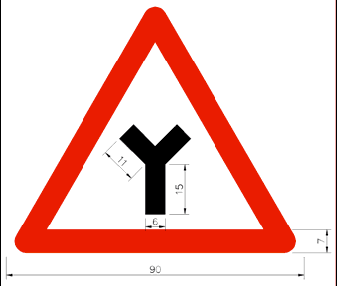
Y Intersection Sign in Taiwan

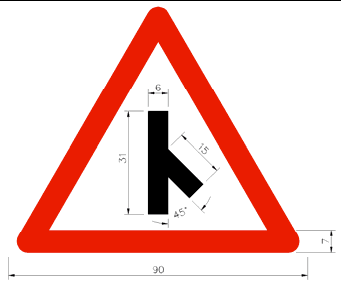
3-way Intersection Sign in Taiwan with side road on the right but not right angle

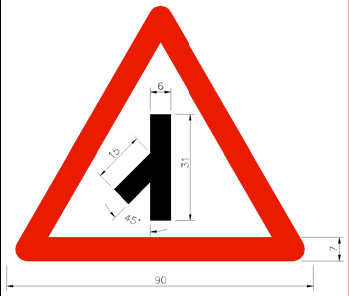
3-way Intersection Sign in Taiwan with side road on the left but not right angle
