= Gun laws in North Carolina =

Location of North Carolina in the United States

Gun laws in North Carolina regulate the sale, possession, and use of firearms and ammunition in the U.S. state of North Carolina.

North Carolina is a permissive state for firearms ownership. The state maintains concealed carry reciprocity with any other state so long as the permit is valid.

== Summary table ==
Subject / law	Long guns	Handguns	Relevant statutes	Notes
State permit required to purchase?	No	No	Senate Bill 41	Senate Bill 41, Guarantee Second Amendment Freedom and Protections, eliminates all pistol purchase permitting laws in the state. Enacted and effective March 29, 2023.
Federal Background Checks Required for all purchase through Firearms Dealers	Yes	Yes		In 2023, North Carolina repealed its law requiring a permit to purchase a handgun and is no longer a partial point of contact state for NICS. Firearms dealers must contact the FBI to process the background check required by federal law.
Background checks required for private sales?	No	No		In 2023, the North Carolina legislature overrode the governor's veto to repeal its law requiring a permit and background check to buy a handgun. The state does not otherwise require background checks on purchases of firearms from unlicensed sellers. Federal and state purchaser prohibitions still apply.
Firearm registration?	No	No		
Assault weapon law?	No	No		
Magazine capacity restriction?	No	No		
Owner license required?	No	No		
Permit required for concealed carry?	N/A	Yes	§ 14-269 §§ 14-415.10 to 14-415.27	North Carolina is a "shall issue" state for citizens and lawful permanent residents who are 21 years or older.
Permit required for open carry?	No	No	§ 160A-189	May carry openly without permit.
Castle Doctrine/Stand Your Ground law?	Yes	Yes	§ 14-51.3	
State preemption of local restrictions?	Yes	Yes	§ 14-409.40 § 14-415.23	Municipalities may ban firearms from government buildings.
NFA weapons restricted?	No	No	§ 14-288.8 § 14-409	
Shall certify?	Yes	Yes	§ 14-409.41	Shall certify within 15 days.
Peaceable Journey laws?	No	No		
Duty to inform?	No	Yes	§ 14-415.11(a)	

== State constitutional provisions ==
Article I, section 30 of the Constitution of North Carolina states:

“A well regulated militia being necessary to the security of a free State, the right of the people to keep and bear arms shall not be infringed; and, as standing armies in time of peace are dangerous to liberty, they shall not be maintained, and the military shall be kept under strict subordination to, and governed by, the civil power. Nothing herein shall justify the practice of carrying concealed weapons, or prevent the General Assembly from enacting penal statutes against that practice.”

== Common law ==
North Carolina is a common law state. Appearing in a public place, armed with a firearm, may be an affray at common law depending on the circumstances. In State v. Huntley (1843), the North Carolina Supreme Court ruled, in part:

It has been remarked that a double-barrel gun, or any other gun, cannot in this country come under the description of "unusual weapons," for there is scarcely a man in the community who does not own and occasionally use a gun of some sort. But we do not feel the force of this criticism. A gun is an "unusual weapon," wherewith to be armed and clad. No man amongst us carries it about with him, as one of his every day accoutrements—as a part of his dress—and never, we trust, will the day come when any deadly weapon will be worn or wielded in our peace-loving and law-abiding State, as an appendage of manly equipment. But although a gun is an "unusual weapon," it is to be remembered that the carrying of a gun, per se, constitutes no (sic) offence. For any lawful purpose—either of business or amusement—the citizen is at perfect liberty to carry his gun. It is the wicked purpose, and the mischievous result, which essentially constitute the crime. He shall not carry about this or any other weapon of death to terrify and alarm, and in such manner as naturally will terrify and alarm a peaceful people.'

Because of State v. Huntley, and other court rulings, caution is urged as to the areas in North Carolina a person frequents with firearms.

== Automatic rifles and machine guns ==
NFA weapons such as registered fully automatic firearms, short-barreled shotguns, and suppressors are legal to own by private citizens in North Carolina so long as ATF regulations are followed.

The ATF requires the transfer of fully automatic weapons to be in compliance with State and Local laws. North Carolina General Statute 14-409 Machine Guns and Other Like Weapons, first established in 1933, states “It shall be unlawful for any person, firm or corporation to manufacture, sell, give away, dispose of, use or possess machine guns, submachine guns, or other like weapons…”. The statute goes further to outline seven specific exceptions allowing for the lawful possession of such weapons in the state of North Carolina:

- Banks, merchants, and recognized business establishments for use in their respective places of business, who shall first apply to and receive from the sheriff of the county in which said business is located, a permit to possess the said weapons for the purpose of defending the said business;
- United States Army, when in discharge of their official duties;
- Officers and soldiers of the militia when called into actual service;
- Officers of the State, or of any county, city or town ... when acting in the discharge of their official duties;
- The manufacture, use or possession of such weapons for scientific or experimental purposes;
- Resident of this State who now owns a machine gun used in former wars, as a relic or souvenir may retain and keep same as his or her property.
- A person who lawfully possesses or owns a weapon in compliance with 26 U.S.C. Chapter 53, §§ 5801-5871.

Any other possession or use of fully automatic weapons in North Carolina is unlawful.

== Acquiring a handgun ==
To acquire a handgun in North Carolina an individual must complete ATF Form 4473 at an FFL licensed seller or through private sales. The seller is required to complete a background check using the National Instant Criminal System (NICS). Completing a NICS check is not required if one has a concealed handgun permit. North Carolina previously had a Pistol Purchase Permit system that was a holdover from Jim Crow laws that were designed to prevent African-Americans and other minorities from easily obtaining handguns. However, the pistol purchase permit law was repealed March 29, 2023.

In accordance to North Carolina Law, no county or local government can require handgun registration.

== Concealed carry ==
=== Concealed carry exemptions summary table ===
Carry ability / Person	CHP holder	Local, fed & state LEOs	Retired LE	LE (off-duty)	Detention & correction	State corrections (off-duty)	Dist. / Sup. Court judge & Magistrate	DA, ADA or investigator	Armed forces (official duty)	NG (in service)	Clerk of court & register of deed	State probation & parole	DPS employee	Admin. law judge	US LE officer	US civil enforcement officer	PPSB armed security
Must complete approved firearms safety course	Yes	No	No	No	No	Yes	Yes	Yes	Yes	Yes	No	No	Yes	Yes	No	No	No
Must inform they are carrying a concealed firearm when addressed by LEO	Yes	Yes	Yes	Yes	Yes	Yes	Yes	Yes	Yes	Yes	Yes	Yes	Yes	Yes	Yes	Yes	Yes
On private premises where there is notice that carrying a concealed handgun prohibited	No	Yes	Yes	Yes	Yes	Yes	Yes	Yes	Yes	Yes	Yes	Yes	Yes	Yes	Yes	Yes	No
Private/public educational property	No	Yes	Yes	Yes	Yes	Yes	Yes	Yes	Yes	Yes	Yes	Yes	Yes	Yes	Yes	Yes	No
Premises where fee charged for admission	No	Yes	Yes	Yes	Yes	Yes	Yes	Yes	Yes	Yes	Yes	Yes	Yes	Yes	Yes	Yes	No
Parade / funeral / picket line or demonstration on healthcare facility or public place owned by state or city	No	Yes	Yes	Yes	Yes	Yes	Yes	Yes	Yes	Yes	Yes	Yes	Yes	Yes	Yes	Yes	No
State capitol building, Executive Mansion, governor or General Court of Justice grounds	No	Yes	Yes	Yes	Yes	Yes	Yes	Yes	Yes	Yes	Yes	Yes	Yes	Yes	Yes	Yes	No
State legislative buildings / associated property	No	Yes	Yes	Yes	Yes	Yes	Yes	Yes	Yes	Yes	Yes	Yes	Yes	Yes	Yes	Yes	No
In a building housing only State or federal offices	No	Yes	Yes	Yes	Yes	Yes	Yes	Yes	Yes	Yes	Yes	Yes	Yes	Yes	Yes	Yes	No
In an office of State / federal government not located in a building exclusively occupied by them	No	Yes	Yes	Yes	Yes	Yes	Yes	Yes	Yes	Yes	Yes	Yes	Yes	Yes	Yes	Yes	No
State owned rest area / fishing / hunting reservation	No	Yes	Yes	Yes	Yes	Yes	Yes	Yes	Yes	Yes	Yes	Yes	Yes	Yes	Yes	Yes	No
Grounds / waters of State Park system	No	Yes	Yes	Yes	Yes	Yes	Yes	Yes	Yes	Yes	Yes	Yes	Yes	Yes	Yes	Yes	No

=== Eligibility requirements ===
Under NCGS 14-415.12 "the sheriff shall issue a permit to an applicant if the applicant qualifies under the following criteria":

- The applicant is a citizen of the United States or has been lawfully admitted for permanent residence as defined in 8 U.S.C. § 1101(a)(20), and has been a resident of the State 30 days or longer immediately preceding the filing of the application (exceptions also exist under 18 US Code S. 922 which allow non-immigrants to purchase a firearm)
- The applicant is 21 years of age or older.
- The applicant does not suffer from a physical or mental infirmity that prevents the safe handling of a handgun
- The applicant has successfully completed an approved firearms safety and training course which involves the actual firing of handguns and instruction in the laws of this State governing the carrying of a concealed handgun and the use of deadly force. Sworn law enforcement, qualified retired law enforcement/corrections/parole/probation or a certified armed security guard are exempt from this course requirement. The North Carolina Criminal Justice Education and Training Standards Commission (NCCJETSC) shall prepare and publish general guidelines for courses and qualifications of instructors which would satisfy the requirements of this subdivision. An approved course shall be any course which satisfies the requirements of this subdivision and is certified or sponsored by:
1. The North Carolina Criminal Justice Education and Training Standards Commission,
2. The National Rifle Association of America, or
3. A law enforcement agency, college, private or public institution or organization, or firearms training school, taught by instructors certified by the North Carolina Criminal Justice Education and Training Standards Commission (NCCJETSC) or the National Rifle Association of America.
- The applicant is not disqualified under subsection (b) of this section (see ineligibility requirements)

Once the above conditions are met, the Sheriff of the relevant County shall issue the permit as North Carolina is a "shall issue" state.

Instructors for these handgun safety classes must be certified by the North Carolina Department of Justice. The Concealed Carry Handgun Safety Class is regulated to be a minimum of eight hours long and must include a written test on state laws pertaining to the use of deadly force, and restrictions on the locations a handgun may be carried in a concealed fashion. In addition, the applicant must shoot a designated course of fire and obtain a passing score. A concealed handgun permit is valid for a period of five years.

=== Ineligibility requirements ===
The sheriff shall deny a permit to an applicant who:

(1) Is ineligible to own, possess, or receive a firearm under the provisions of State or federal law.
(2) Is under indictment or against whom a finding of probable cause exists for a felony.
(3) Has been adjudicated guilty in any court of a felony, unless:

(i) the felony is an offense that pertains to antitrust violations, unfair trade practices, or restraints of trade, or
(ii) the person's firearms rights have been restored pursuant to G.S. 14–415.4.

(4) Is a fugitive from justice.
(5) Is an unlawful user of, or addicted to marijuana, alcohol, or any depressant, stimulant, or narcotic drug, or any other controlled substance as defined in 21 U.S.C. § 802.
(6) Is currently, or has been previously adjudicated by a court or administratively determined by a governmental agency whose decisions are subject to judicial review to be, lacking mental capacity or mentally ill. Receipt of previous consultative services or outpatient treatment alone shall not disqualify an applicant under this subdivision.
(7) Is or has been discharged from the Armed Forces of the United States under conditions other than honorable.
(8) Except as provided in subdivision (8a), (8b), or (8c) of this section, is or has been adjudicated guilty of or received a prayer for judgment continued or suspended sentence for one or more crimes of violence constituting a misdemeanor, including but not limited to, a violation of a misdemeanor under Article 8 of Chapter 14 of the NCGS except for a violation of G.S. 14–33(a), or a violation of a misdemeanor under G.S. 14–226.1, 4-258.1, 14-269.2, 14-269.3, 14-269.4, 14-269.6, 14-277, 14-277.1, 14-277.2, 14-283 except for a violation involving fireworks exempted under G.S. 14–414, 14-288.2, 14-288.4(a)(1), 14-288.6, 14-288.9, former 14-288.12, former 14-288.13, former 14-288.14, 14-415.21(b), or 14-415.26(d) within three years prior to the date on which the application is submitted.
(8a) Is or has been adjudicated guilty of or received a prayer for judgment continued or suspended sentence for one or more crimes of violence constituting a misdemeanor under G.S. 14–33(c)(1), 14-33(c)(2), 14-33(c)(3), 14-33(d), 14-277.3A, 14-318.2, 14-134.3, 50B-4.1, or former G.S. 14–277.3.
(8b) Is prohibited from possessing a firearm pursuant to 18 U.S.C. § 922(g) as a result of a conviction of a misdemeanor crime of domestic violence.
(8c) Has been adjudicated guilty of or received a prayer for judgment continued or suspended sentence for one or more crimes involving an assault or a threat to assault a law enforcement officer, probation or parole officer, person employed at a State or local detention facility, firefighter, emergency medical technician, medical responder, or emergency department personnel.
(9) Has had entry of a prayer for judgment continued for a criminal offense which would disqualify the person from obtaining a concealed handgun permit.
(10) Is free on bond or personal recognizance pending trial, appeal, or sentencing for a crime which would disqualify him from obtaining a concealed handgun permit.
(11) Has been convicted of an impaired driving offense under G.S. 20–138.1, 20-138.2, or 20-138.3 within three years prior to the date on which the application is submitted.
(c) An applicant shall not be ineligible to receive a concealed carry permit under subdivision (6) of subsection (b) of this section because of an adjudication of mental incapacity or illness or an involuntary commitment to mental health services if the individual's rights have been restored under G.S. 14–409.42. (1995, c. 398, s. 1; c. 509, s. 135.3(d); 1997-441, s. 4; 2007-427, s. 5; 2008-210, s. 3(b); 2009–58, s. 1; 2010-108, s. 5; 2011-2, s. 1; 2011-183, s. 16; 2012-12, s. 2(bb); 2013-369, s. 11; 2015-195, ss. 7, 11(l), 17.)

It is a non-criminal violation of the law (infraction) for an individual to fail to disclose to a law enforcement officer that he has a concealed handgun on/about his person "when approached or addressed by the officer" or to provide the concealed handgun permit when required.

=== Scope of concealed carry permit ===
The following restrictions and conditions for concealed carry are set out in the Chapter 14-415.11 of the NC General Statutes:

- The person shall carry the permit together with valid identification whenever the person is carrying a concealed handgun
- The person shall disclose to any law enforcement officer that the person holds a valid permit and is carrying a concealed handgun when approached or addressed by the officer, and shall display both the permit and the proper identification upon the request
- Except as provided in G.S. 14-415.27 (expanded permit scope for certain persons), a permit does not authorize a person to carry a concealed handgun in any of the following:
1. Areas prohibited by G.S. 14-269.2 (various educational public or private property - unless person has a CHP & stored in vehicle), 14-269.3 (into any assembly where a fee has been charged for admission or any establishment where alcoholic beverages are sold & consumed - unless person has a CHP), and 14-277.2 (present or spectator at parade, funeral procession, picket line, or demonstration upon any private health care facility or upon any public place owned/controlled by the State or a city etc - unless person has a CHP)
2. Areas prohibited by G.S. 14-269.4 (state capitol building, Executive Mansion, western resident of governor or on grounds/building housing any court of the General Court of Justice) except as allowed under G.S. 14-269.4(6)(CHP holders may store the firearm on the above property if in a container/compartment in a locked vehicle)
3. In an area prohibited by rule adopted under G.S. 120-32.1 (state legislative buildings and associated property)
4. In any area prohibited by 18 U.S.C. § 922 or any other federal law
5. In a law enforcement or correctional facility
6. In a building housing only State or federal offices
7. In an office of the State or federal government that is not located in a building exclusively occupied by the State or federal government
8. On any private premises where notice that carrying a concealed handgun is prohibited by the posting of a conspicuous notice or statement by the person in legal possession or control of the premises
- Any person who has a concealed handgun permit may carry a concealed handgun on the grounds or waters of a park within the State Parks System as defined in G.S. 143B-135.44
- It shall be unlawful for a person, with or without a permit, to carry a concealed handgun while consuming alcohol or at any time while the person has remaining in the person's body any alcohol or in the person's blood a controlled substance previously consumed, but a person does not violate this condition if a controlled substance in the person's blood was lawfully obtained and taken in therapeutically appropriate amounts or if the person is on the person's own property
- As provided in G.S. 14-269.4(5), it shall be lawful for a person to carry any firearm openly, or to carry a concealed handgun with a concealed carry permit, at any State-owned rest area, at any State-owned rest stop along the highways, and at any State-owned hunting and fishing reservation
- A person who is issued a permit shall notify the sheriff who issued the permit of any change in the person's permanent address within 30 days after the change of address. If a permit is lost or destroyed, the person to whom the permit was issued shall notify the sheriff who issued the permit of the loss or destruction of the permit. A person may obtain a duplicate permit by submitting to the sheriff a notarized statement that the permit was lost or destroyed and paying the required duplicate permit fee.
- This subsection shall not be construed to permit a person to carry a concealed handgun on any premises where the person in legal possession or control of the premises has posted a conspicuous notice prohibiting the carrying of a concealed handgun on the premises in accordance with G.S. 14–415.11(c)

Furthermore, it is a Class I Felony for any person knowingly to possess or carry, whether openly or concealed, any gun, rifle, pistol, or other firearm of any kind on educational property or to a curricular or extracurricular activity sponsored by a school(G.S. 14–269.2).

It is also unlawful for a person to arm himself or herself with a gun for the purpose of terrifying others^{[note 1]} and go about so on public highways in a manner to cause terror.

=== Law enforcement, military & other individuals - permit scope expansions ===
In addition to the requirement to complete a certified conceal carry handgun safety course, the following individuals are able to carry - a handgun in certain circumstances currently prohibited for a civilian CHP holder (unless otherwise prohibited by federal law). The definitions of each are defined under NCGS Chapter 14 Article 54B.

- Officers and enlisted personnel of the Armed Forces of the US when in discharge of their official duties as such and acting under orders requiring them to carry arms and weapons
- Civil & law enforcement officers of the United States
- Officers and soldiers of the militia and the National Guard when called into actual service
- A member of the North Carolina National Guard who has been designated by Adjutant General who has a CHP and acting in discharge of official duties, provided the member does not carry a concealed weapon while consuming alcohol or an unlawful controlled substance or while alcohol or an unlawful controlled substance remains in the member's body
- Officers of the State, or of any county, city, town, or company police agency charged with the execution of the laws of the State, when acting in the discharge of their official duties
- A district attorney, assistant district attorney or an investigator employed by the office of a district attorney and who has a CHP provided the person shall not carry a concealed weapon at any time while in a courtroom or while consuming alcohol or an unlawful controlled substance or while alcohol or an unlawful controlled substance remains in the person's body
- A qualified retired law enforcement officer as defined in G.S. 14-415.10 and meets any one of the following: the holder of a CHP or is exempt from obtaining a permit pursuant to G.S. 14-415.25 (federal law enforcement) or certified by the NC CJE&TSC pursuant to G.S. 14-415.26
- Detention personnel or correctional officers employed by the State or a unit of local government
- NC district court judge, NC Superior Court judge, or a NC magistrate and who has a CHP provided the person shall not carry a concealed weapon at any time while consuming alcohol or an unlawful controlled substance or while alcohol or an unlawful controlled substance remains in the person's body
- A person serving as a clerk of court or as a register of deeds and who has a CHP provided that the person shall not carry a concealed weapon at any time while consuming alcohol or an unlawful controlled substance or while alcohol or an unlawful controlled substance remains in the person's body
- Sworn law-enforcement officers, when off-duty, provided that an officer does not carry a concealed weapon while consuming alcohol or an unlawful controlled substance or while alcohol or an unlawful controlled substance remains in the officer's body
- State probation or parole certified officers, when off-duty, provided that an officer does not carry a concealed weapon while consuming alcohol or an unlawful controlled substance or while alcohol or an unlawful controlled substance remains in the officer's body
- Person employed by the Department of Public Safety who has been designated by the Secretary of the Department, who has a CHP and has in person's possession proof of the designation by the Secretary of the Department, provided that the person shall not carry a concealed weapon at any time while consuming alcohol or an unlawful controlled substance or while alcohol or an unlawful controlled substance remains in the person's body
- An administrative law judge described in Article 60 of Chapter 7A of the NCGS and who has a CHP provided that the person shall not carry a concealed weapon at any time while consuming alcohol or an unlawful controlled substance or while alcohol or an unlawful controlled substance remains in the person's body
- State correctional officers, when off-duty, provided that an officer does not carry a concealed weapon while consuming alcohol or an unlawful controlled substance or while alcohol or an unlawful controlled substance remains in the officer's body

NCGS 14-415.11 creates the following exemptions to allow lawful carry for the above individuals:

- Areas prohibited by G.S. 14-269.2 (various educational public or private property), 14-269.3 (into any assembly where a fee has been charged for admission or any establishment where alcoholic beverages are sold & consumed), and 14-277.2 (present or spectator at parade, funeral procession, picket line, or demonstration upon any private health care facility or upon any public place owned/controlled by the State or a city etc)
- Areas prohibited by G.S. 14-269.4 (state capitol building, Executive Mansion, western resident of governor or on grounds/building housing any court of the General Court of Justice)
- In an area prohibited by rule adopted under G.S. 120-32.1 (state legislative buildings and associated property)
- In any area prohibited by 18 U.S.C. § 922 or any other federal law
- In a law enforcement or correctional facility
- In a building housing only State or federal offices
- In an office of the State or federal government that is not located in a building exclusively occupied by the State or federal government
- On any private premises where notice that carrying a concealed handgun is prohibited by the posting of a conspicuous notice or statement by the person in legal possession or control of the premises

=== Permit reciprocity ===
Effective December 1, 2011, North Carolina automatically recognizes concealed carry permits issued in any other state.

§ 14-415.24. Reciprocity; out-of-state handgun permits

(a) A valid concealed handgun permit or license issued by another state is valid in North Carolina.

The above subsection of this statute previously gave reciprocity only when the state the permit was from also gave reciprocity, but this requirement was repealed under Session Laws 2011-268, s. 22(a) on December 1, 2011. This session also removed the need for the Attorney General to maintain a database of states that meet the requirements of an NC permit. Due to the wording of the reciprocity statute, North Carolina is one of only a handful of states to allow their residents to carry with out of state permits along with non-residents, creating an alternative route for residents to conceal carry in North Carolina.

=== Law Enforcement Officers Safety Act of 2004 ===
The Law Enforcement Officers Safety Act of 2004 is a federal law that allows out-of-state sworn law enforcement officers to carry concealed handguns in all states. These out-of-state law enforcement officers may carry in certain areas of North Carolina as long as they are a qualified officer of a governmental agency. They must also be authorized by law to enforce criminal laws with the statutory powers of arrest and be authorized to carry firearms with their agency. The officer must carry valid photo identification as an officer. In North Carolina, the out-of-state officer may not carry in either public or private areas where the possession of firearms is prohibited. Certain qualified retired officers may also be eligible to carry concealed handguns in North Carolina.

=== Case law ===
Various case law has been ruled on in NC clarifying the interpretation of concealed carry law. North Carolina v. McManus (1883) stated a weapon concealed on or "about his person" was still in violation of the law. It was held that a weapon concealed within immediate reach and control of a defendant, is a considered a concealed weapon for the purpose of the law.

In State v. Gainey (1968), the appeals court found that a firearm concealed within the passenger compartment of a vehicle is not necessarily immediately available if the circumstances dictate.

State v. Soles (2008) held that a firearm concealed inside a backpack could not be deemed as such because the state did not present enough evidence to show this and a conviction is made beyond all reasonable doubt, not on an assumption.

== Local government restrictions limited by state ==
In 2015, the state legislature set out to make the local gun laws in North Carolina more uniform across the board. They acknowledged the need for local governments prohibit firearms in local government buildings, but they also restricted a local government's ability to prohibit on "municipal and county recreational facilities that are specifically identified by the unit of local government".

The bill states that no political subdivision, boards or agencies of the State or any city, county, municipality, etc may enact rules, ordinances or regulations concerning the legal carry of a concealed handgun. The bill does, however, state "that a unit of local government may adopt an ordinance to permit the posting of a prohibition against the concealed carry of a handgun in accordance with NCGS § 14-415.11(c)" (places where concealed carry is prohibited and exemptions).

It also states that "A unit of local government may also adopt an ordinance to prohibit, by posting, the carrying of a concealed handgun on municipal and county recreational facilities that are specifically identified by the unit of local government. If a unit of local government adopts such an ordinance with regard to recreational facilities, then the concealed handgun permittee may lawfully secure the handgun in a locked vehicle within the trunk, glove box," etc.

NCGS § 14-415.23 Statewide uniformity identifies 'recreational facilities' specifically as:

(c) For purposes of this section, the term "recreational facilities" includes only the following:

(1) An athletic field, including any appurtenant facilities such as restrooms, during an organized athletic event if the field had been scheduled for use with the municipality or county office responsible for operation of the park or recreational area.
(2) A swimming pool, including any appurtenant facilities used for dressing, storage of personal items, or other uses relating to the swimming pool.
(3) A facility used for athletic events, including, but not limited to, a gymnasium.

(d) For the purposes of this section, the term "recreational facilities" does not include any greenway, designated biking or walking path, an area that is customarily used as a walkway or bike path although not specifically designated for such use, open areas or fields where athletic events may occur unless the area qualifies as an "athletic field" pursuant to subdivision (1) of subsection (c) of this section, and any other area that is not specifically described in subsection (c) of this section.

Despite this legislation being in place, many buildings still maintain 'gun free zone' signs on the entrances to the property, thus rendering them merely voluntary. Examples of this still being commonplace are Crabtree Creek Trail or buildings within Pullen Park, Raleigh. Some local governments have begun to amend their local ordinances to comply with state law.

76 of North Carolina's 100 counties have adopted Second Amendment sanctuary resolutions.

== Open carry ==
Open carry is also legal throughout North Carolina. In the town of Chapel Hill, open carry is restricted to guns of a certain minimum size, under the theory that small, concealable handguns are more often associated with criminal activity. No permit is required to carry a handgun openly in North Carolina. In the court case of State v. Kerner (1921) the defendant ended up getting into some type of confrontation with another man. The defendant walked back to his place of work, got his gun, and then returned to the scene to fight. The defendant ended up being charged with "carrying a concealed weapon" and "carrying his pistol off his premises unconcealed", which violated a local act applicable to Forsyth County and ended up being a misdemeanor. The defendant was taken to trial and the trial judge then dismissed the charge as unconstitutional. The state then appealed, and the supreme court affirmed. During court, the court stated at the beginning that the Second Amendment did not apply, because "the first ten amendments to the United States Constitution are restrictions on the federal authority and not the states". Therefore, with that being said, it focused more on the state constitution. The state constitution states that: "A well regulated militia, being necessary to the security of a free state, the right of the people to keep and bear arms, shall not be infringed." The court viewed the provision as protecting the right to carry arms in public. Although the case of State v. Kerner helped make more clear the allowance of openly carrying a pistol, it does not preclude all regulations regarding the carrying of firearms.

On September 1, 2020, the town council of Holly Springs voted to prohibit open carry on town property.

== States of emergency ==
Changes to North Carolina law, effective October 1, 2012, removed the prohibition on legal gun owners from carrying lawfully possessed firearms during a declared state of emergency via the Emergency Management Act.

Pursuant to North Carolina's Emergency Management Act (Chapter 166A of the General Statutes) local governments may impose restrictions on dangerous weapons such as explosives, incendiary devices, and radioactive materials and devices when a state of emergency is declared but may not impose restrictions on lawfully possessed firearms.

Prior to October 1, 2012, firearms could not be legally transported or possessed off of one's own premises during a declared state of emergency or in the immediate vicinity of a riot, except for law enforcement and military personnel in the performance of their duties. On March 29, 2012, the provision barring the carry and possession of a firearm during a declared state of emergency was declared unconstitutional by a US Federal Court (No. 5:10-CV-265-H [E.D.N.C. filed March 29, 2012])

== Other offenses ==
Under GS 14.35.1 it is a Class 1 misdemeanor to allow the storage of a firearm in a condition it can be discharged and "in a manner that the person knew or should have known that an unsupervised minor would be able to gain access to the firearm" and if the minor carries out certain unlawful acts with it.

== See also ==
- Law of North Carolina

== Notes ==
^[note 1] The offense is known as "going armed to the terror of the people".
