= Moving violation =

Violation of the law committed by the driver of a vehicle while it is in motion

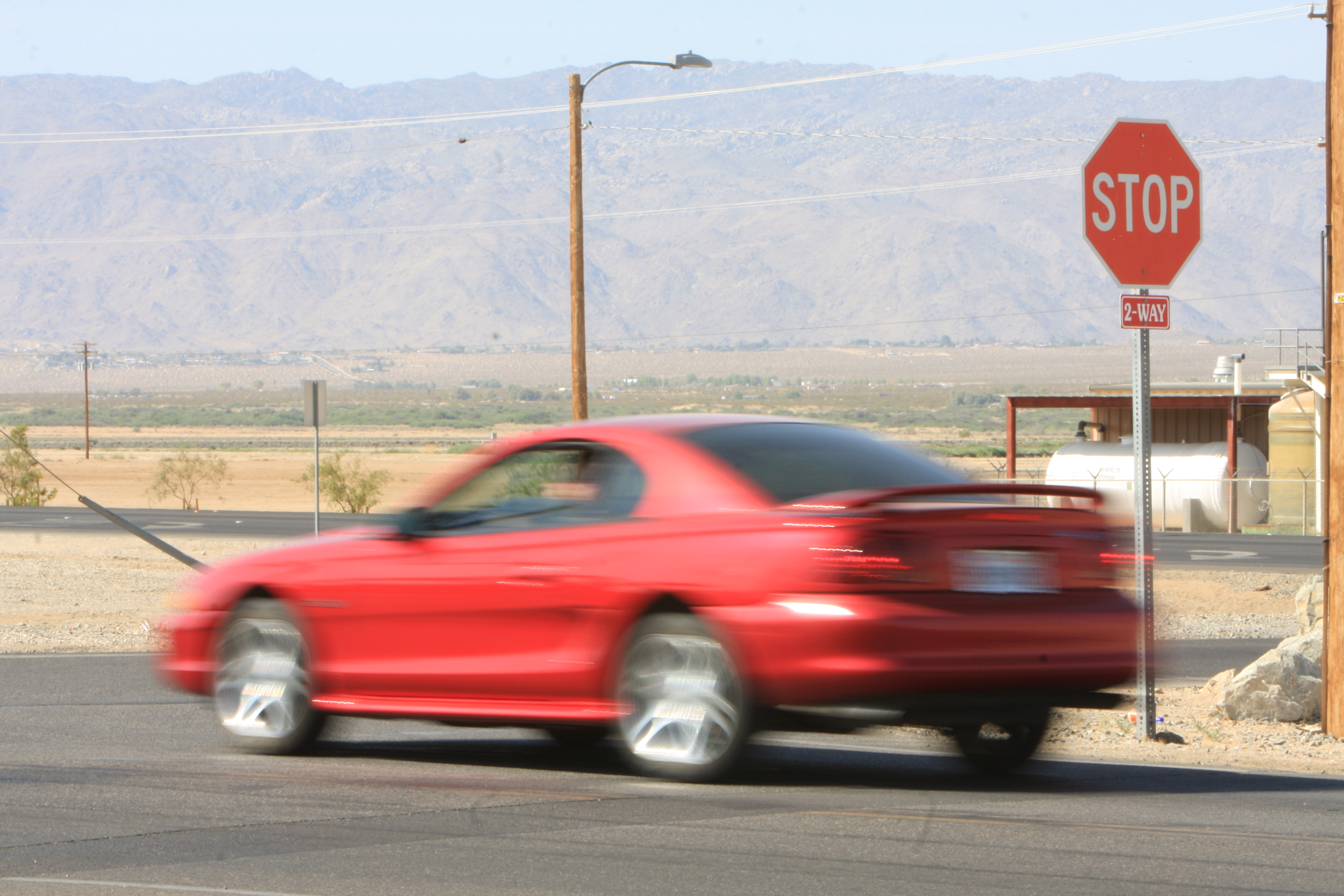
A car driving past a stop sign without stopping, a common form of moving violation

A moving violation or traffic violation is any violation of the law committed by the driver of a vehicle while it is in motion. The term "moving" distinguishes it from other motor vehicle violations, such as paperwork violations (which include violations involving vehicle insurance, registration, and inspection), parking violations, or equipment violations. The United States Department of State makes reference to moving violations in its enforcement guidance.

== Types ==
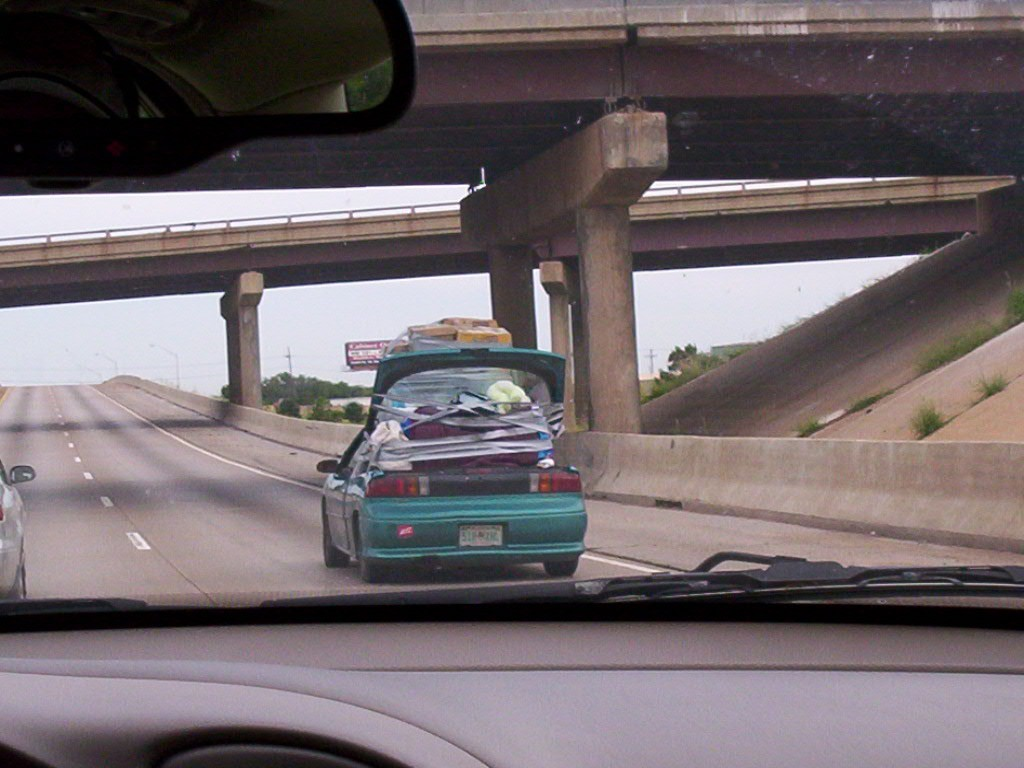
A car carrying an excessive amount of cargo, secured to the trunk using duct tape. Such a violation would be considered relatively minor.

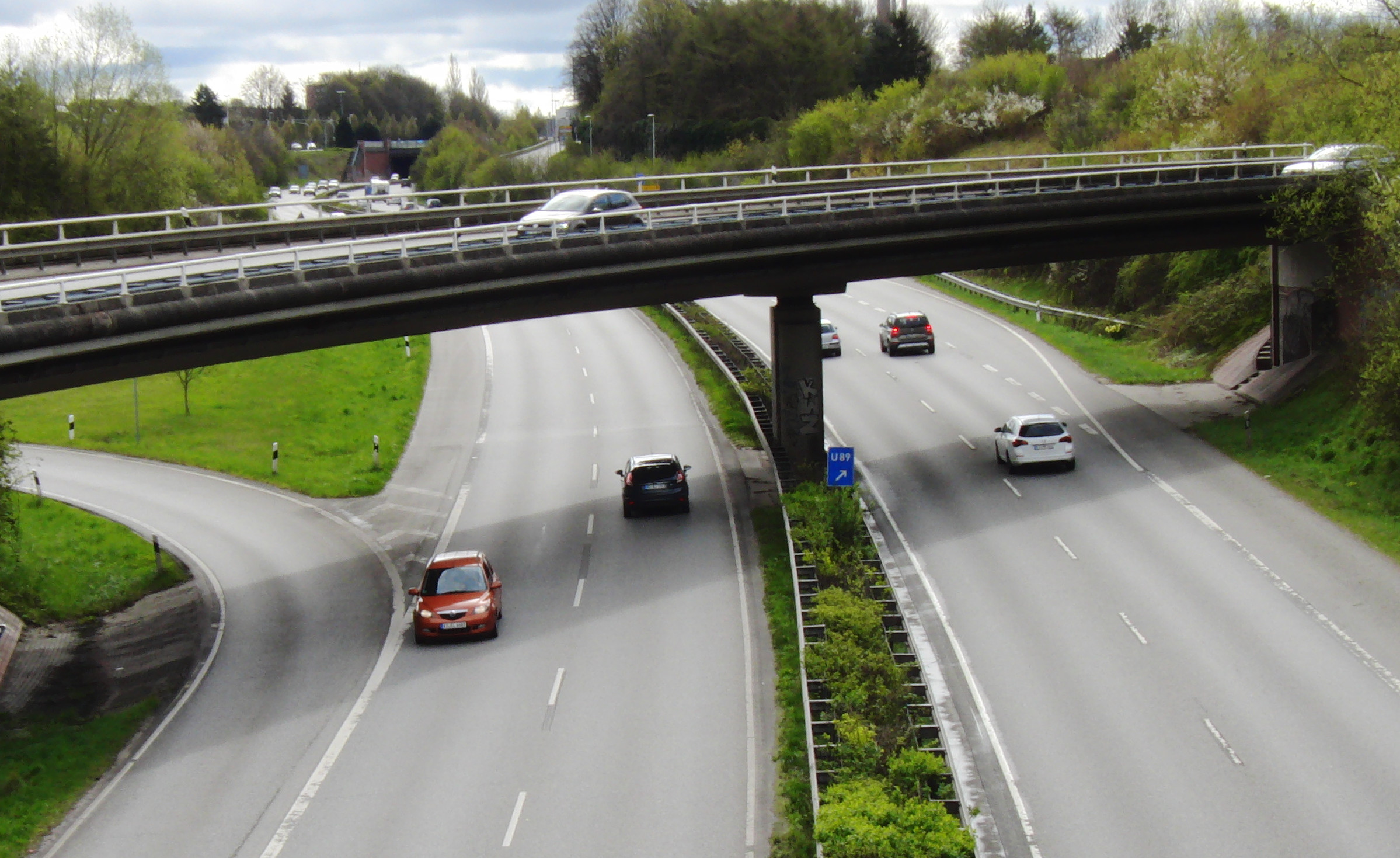
A car traveling on opposite lanes, facing opposing traffic. Such a violation would be considered major.

While some violations, like parking violations, are civil matters involving a vehicle's owner, moving violations are charged against the actual driver.

Moving violations are usually classified as infractions or misdemeanors, but serious violations such as hit and run, driving under the influence, and road rage can be considered felonies.

== Costs ==
Moving violation convictions typically result in fines and demerit points assessed to the license of the driver. As a driver accumulates points, they may be required to attend defensive driving lessons, retake their driving test, pay additional taxes, or even surrender their license. Additionally, moving violations often increase insurance premiums. Drivers with more points on their driving record often must pay more for car insurance than drivers with fewer.

Sometimes tickets are used in a speed trap as a form of fundraising. For example, a local government that is suffering a budget shortfall may ticket more aggressively within its jurisdiction to increase revenue.

In the United States, citation fines can vary widely between jurisdictions for the same behavior, usually between $25 and $1,000. In countries such as Finland however, they are specific proportions of the violator's income, and fines in excess of $100,000 can be assessed to wealthy individuals. In Canada, each province is individual in how they treat similar behavior, though each violation usually includes a set fine and demerit points against the driver's license. For example, a speeding ticket in Ontario of 50+ km over is 6 demerit points against the driver's license with the approximate fine calculated as (km over x 9.75) x 1.25, as well it carries a one-week automatic license suspension and car impoundment; in Manitoba, speeding in excess of 49 km is 10 demerit points and a fine of 672 dollars and a Serious Offence Licence Suspension.

== Examples of moving violations ==
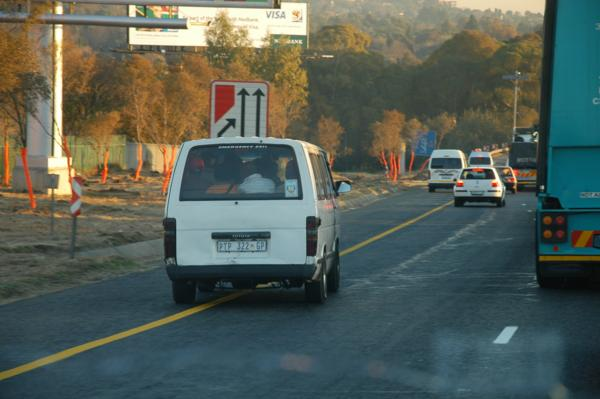
A van operating as an unlicensed bus crossing a solid yellow line.

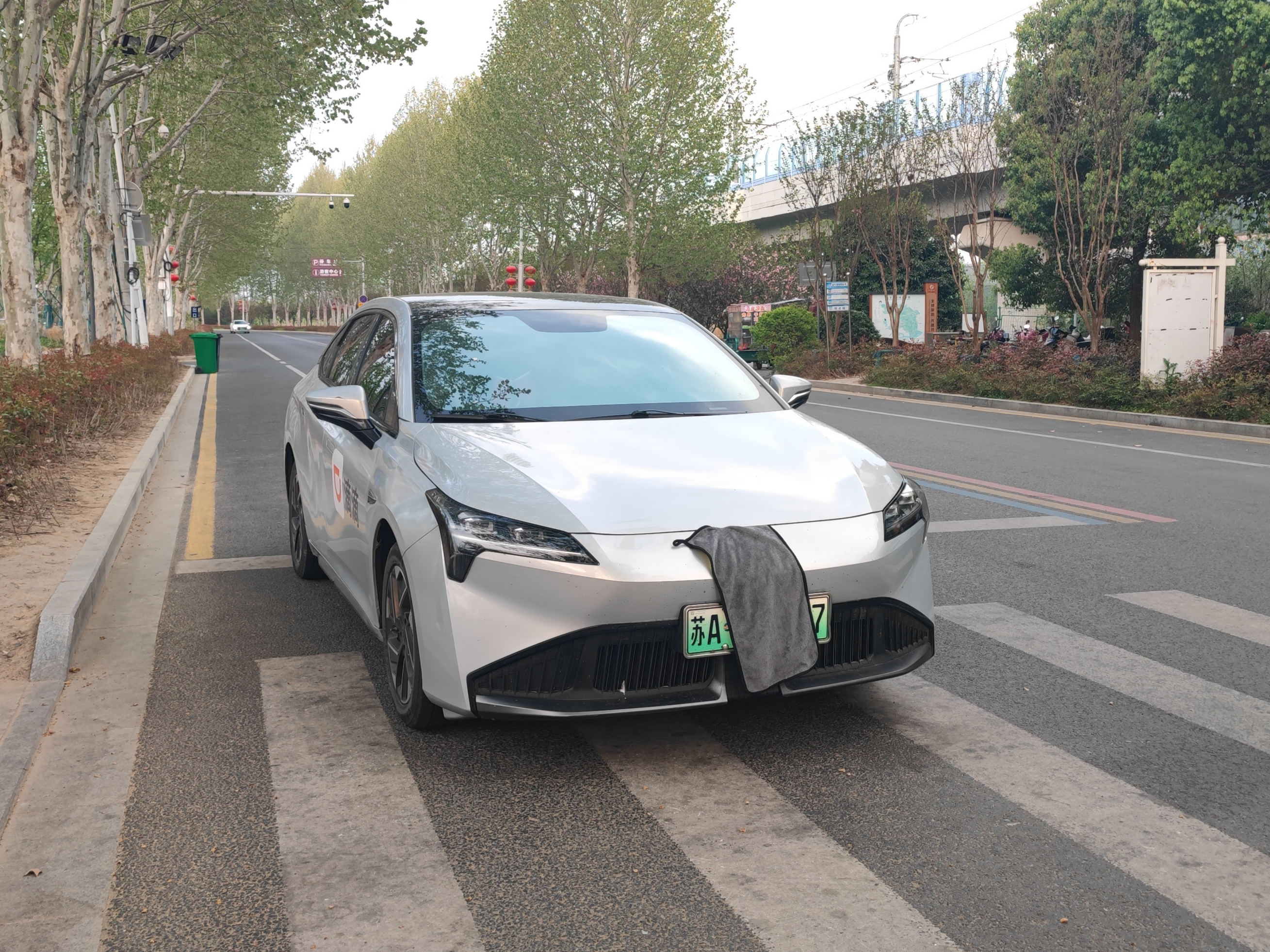
A car whose license plate got obscured parked on a crosswalk too far from the shoulder of the road. Though technically a parking violation, depending on the jurisdiction and context (such as the vehicle being witnessed parking there by police), this could potentially count as a moving violation.

- Speeding, which can be exceeding a limit or (in some jurisdictions) simply driving at an unsafe speed
- Driving significantly below the speed limit to the point of obstructing traffic
- Tailgating or failing to maintain an assured clear distance ahead
- Driving or rolling past a stop sign or red traffic light without stopping
- Failure to yield to another vehicle with the right-of-way
- Failure to signal for turns or lane changes
- Improper lane usage, such as failing to drive within a single lane
- Crossing over a center divider, median, or gore
- Driving on the shoulder where it is considered illegal under certain conditions
- Failure to use a seat belt
- Illegal use of window tints and obstructions
- Failure to stop for a pedestrian in a crosswalk
- Failure to stop for a school bus when children are boarding or exiting (in certain jurisdictions)
- Failure to secure a load to a truck, lorry, or other vehicle
- Driving in a car pool lane illegally
- Operating a telecommunications device while driving (in jurisdictions that prohibit this)
- Driving a vehicle outside the conditions of one's license
- Driving without a license or with a suspended license or with a license from another country
- Driving a vehicle in a bus lane or on railway tracks
- failure to stop after a traffic collision or make a report
- Driving on the wrong side of the road, unless there is an obstruction

More serious moving violations include:

- Driving under the influence
- Reckless driving or dangerous driving
- Street racing
- Vehicular homicide

=== Moving violations and driving records ===
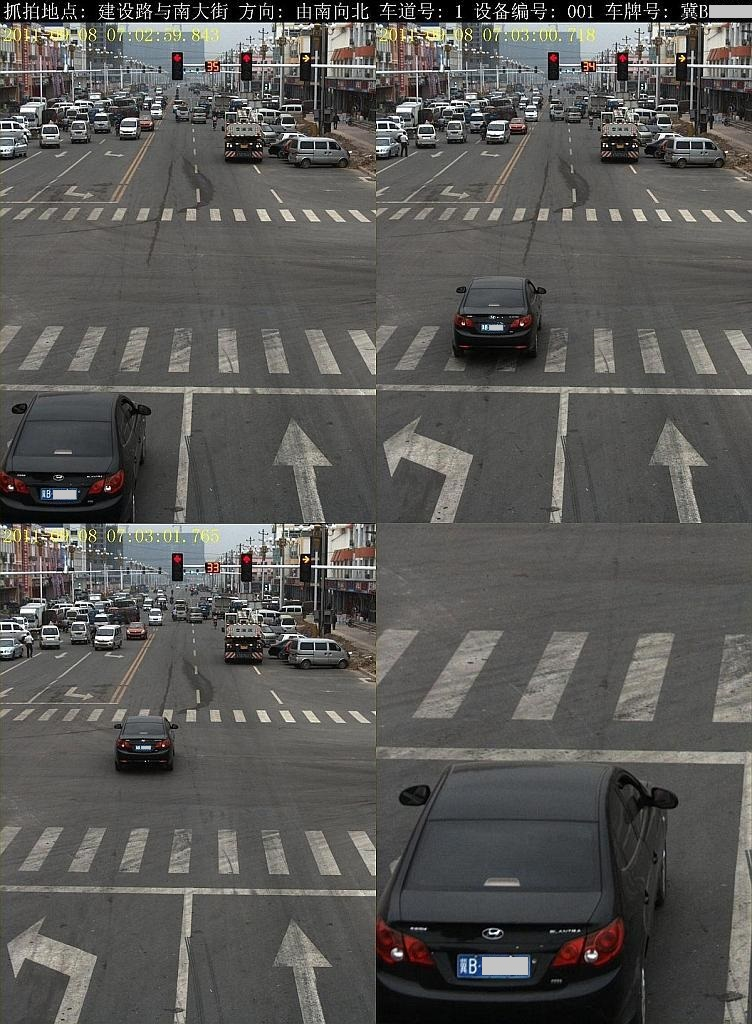
A set of pictures taken by a red light camera of a black car running a red light

Exactly how long moving violations stay on a driving record depends on jurisdictional laws; for example, in New York, minor moving violations can stay on a driving record abstract for a maximum of four years. Whereas minor moving violations tend to stay on a person's abstract for only a few years, some serious moving violations are classified as criminal offenses that result in a criminal record that may be maintained for life.

== See also ==
- Traffic enforcement
- Traffic ticket
- Traffic court
- Traffic school
