= Hit and run =

Failing to stop after causing or contributing to a traffic collision

An example of a 'hit and run' in Chicago, Illinois in 2018

In traffic laws, a hit and run or a hit-and-run is the criminal act of being involved in a traffic collision and not stopping afterwards. It is considered a supplemental crime in most jurisdictions.

== Additional obligation ==
In many jurisdictions, there may be additional obligations such as to exchange information about one's financial responsibility (including any applicable insurance); to summon emergency services if they are needed; or to render any reasonable assistance to those who are injured or in peril ("duty to rescue" laws). There may also be requirement to leave a note containing pertinent information if the property owner is not present.

== History ==
Hit-and-run laws were among the earliest traffic laws to be enacted after the invention of motor vehicles; they arose from the difficulties that early traffic collision victims faced in identifying perpetrators and bringing them to justice. Apart from the obvious ability of an automobile to flee the scene quickly (if still driveable), roads were unpaved and hence quite dusty, vehicles at the time did not have license plates, and drivers wore large goggles and dusters which effectively rendered them anonymous.

== Legal consequences ==
Legal consequences of a hit and run may include the suspension or cancellation of one's driver's license; lifetime revocation of a driver's license is possible in certain jurisdictions. It is frequently considered a criminal offense, which can be punished by fines and imprisonment. Insurance companies often raise the insurance costs or even void the policies of drivers involved in this offense.

Attempts to understand the mental state of the hit and run driver began soon after the offense became codified, in a paper titled "The Feebleminded Motorist" (1942) and has been explored again in an article titled "The Psychology of Hit and Run" (2008).

== Country-specific penalties ==
=== Australia ===
Under Australian law, a driver involved in a crash must stop at the scene and give their information to all other drivers involved and anyone injured, as well as the owner and driver of any property damaged, and a police officer if:

- Anyone is killed or injured;
- A vehicle involved in the crash is towed or otherwise carried away from the crash by another vehicle;
- Any other driver involved in the crash does not stop to exchange information;
- A police officer asks for any of the information.

The demerit point system is used for the commission of traffic offences in Australia; for each offence committed, a certain number of points are given, and the accumulation of points can lead to fines and license suspension or revocation. When a driver fails to stop at the scene and provide the required information to the necessary people, he or she is guilty of a hit and run, which carries a maximum penalty of 20 points.

=== Bangladesh ===
In Bangladesh, according to The Vehicles Act, 1927, the person in charge of a vehicle shall cause the vehicle to stop and to remain stationary so long as may be reasonably be necessary.

- When required to do so by any police-officer for the purpose of regulating traffic or of ascertaining driver name and address with a view to prosecuting such person under The Vehicles Act, 1927 or for any purpose connected with the enforcement of the provisions of this Act or the rules thereunder.
- When a person knows or has reason to believe that a crash has occurred to any person or to any animal or conveyance in charge of a person owing to the presence of the vehicle, and person shall also give his/her/their name and address and the name and address of the owner of such vehicle, to any police-officer in uniform present or to any person reasonably requesting such names and addresses.

According to Road Transport Act, 2018, all licenses will be carrying 12 points. Nine types of traffic violations—such as speeding or excessive honking—will result in a point being awarded to a license. If a license reaches 12 points, it will be revoked. In this Act, Section 105 of 11th chapter states no matter what, if anybody gets seriously injured or killed in a hit-and-run or any kind of motor vehicle-related crash, it would be considered as an offence under the relevant sections of the Penal Code, 1860. This ranges from Section 302 to 304B, with the maximum punishment being a death sentence. The offences that fall under section 105 of the Act are not eligible for bail.

=== Canada ===
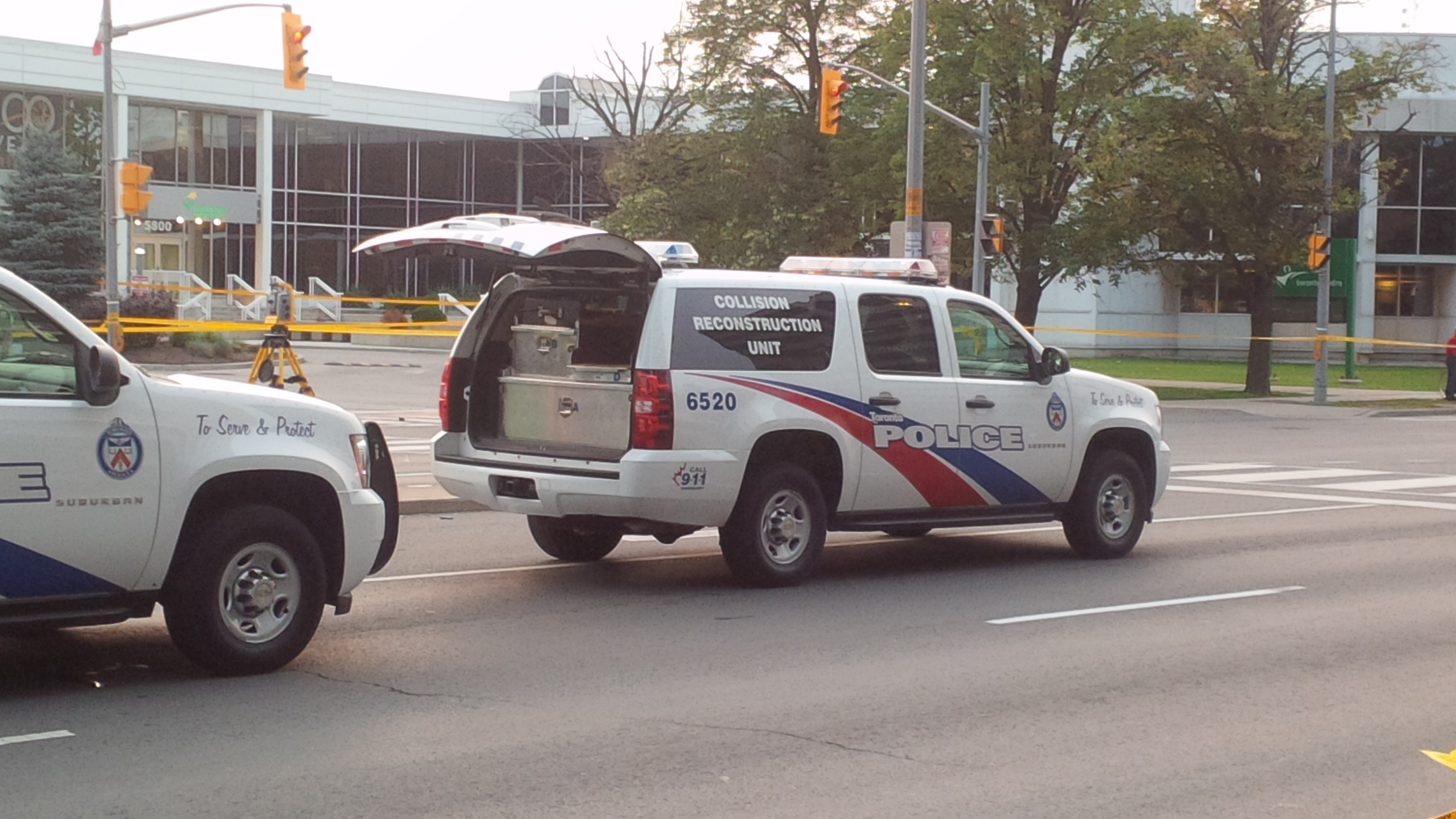
Collision Reconstruction Unit vehicles at a hit and run in Toronto as officers try to piece together the story

Hit and run is defined in Canada as failure to stop at the scene of a crash under the Criminal Code and is subject to a penalty of up to 5 years in prison. If bodily harm or death is caused in the crash and the prosecution can prove that the accused was aware of the bodily harm or death, the maximum penalties are up to 10 years in prison or up to life imprisonment, respectively.

For a person to be convicted of failure to stop at the scene of a crash, the prosecution must prove that the accused was aware of the crash, the accused voluntarily failed to stop and render assistance and the intent for failing to stop was to evade civil or criminal liability. While the prosecution bears the traditional criminal burden of proof beyond a reasonable doubt, the accused is presumed to have intended to evade civil or criminal liability if the prosecution can prove the other elements of the offence. This reverse onus has been held to be a justified limit under section 1 of the Canadian Charter of Rights and Freedoms.

Canadians are also required to provide their name, address and license number in writing according to the Sec. 252 (1) of the Criminal Code. Depending on the provincial law other pieces of information may be requested such as insurance number and license plate. Car Insurance is mandatory in Canada.

If the accused is also convicted of other offences in relation to the crash, then courts will often make the sentence for hit and run consecutive to the penalties for the other offences, the rationale being that hit and run is often committed with the intent of evading criminal or civil liability.

=== China ===
Article 101 of the Road Traffic Safety Law of the People's Republic of China provides that in a major crash, a hit and run results in revocation of the offender's driving license, and up to a lifetime ban from obtaining one again.

Article 133 of the Criminal code as of 1997 provides that hit and run after an incident resulting in death, grievous bodily harm or major property damage is punishable with 3 to 7 years' imprisonment, and fixed-term imprisonment of 3 to 7 years if there was an attempt at escaping the scene of crash or is involved in other especially flagrant circumstances, and fixed-term imprisonment of not less than 7 years if the act of attempted escape results in death.

==== Hong Kong ====
Where, owing to the presence of a vehicle on a road, a crash occurs whereby-

(a) personal injury is caused to a person other than the driver of that vehicle; or
(b) damage is caused to-

(i) a vehicle other than that vehicle or a trailer drawn thereby;
(ii) an animal (any horse, cattle, ass, mule, sheep, pig or goat) other than an animal in or on that vehicle or a trailer drawn thereby; or
(iii) any other thing not being in or on that vehicle or a trailer drawn thereby, the driver of that vehicle shall stop. Otherwise, the driver commits an offence and is liable to a fine of 10000 Hong Kong dollars and to imprisonment for 12 months.

=== Finland ===
Section 11 of the Criminal Code of Finland mandates the driver of a motor vehicle or a tram involved in a road accident to stop and render aid according to one's best abilities to the casualties of the accident. Failure to do so is punishable with a fine, or a prison term of up to one year. However, due to the Finnish interpretation of the freedom from self-incrimination, is not legally mandatory to identify oneself, or to give up any contact information.

=== Germany ===
Anyone who has caused a traffic crash, or contributed to it, has the duty to identify themselves to the victims or to other contributors. If the victim is not present (such as in the case of damage of a parked car) the one who caused the crash has to wait a certain time. If the victim does not appear, he has to report the crash at the next police station without delay. Violation of these rules ("illicit leaving of the scene of a crash") is punishable with prison up to three years or a fine (section 142 of the Strafgesetzbuch).

Different in that it applies not only to those directly involved in a crash, section 323c states that anyone who fails to provide necessary help in an emergency can be punished with prison up to one year or a fine. This applies only if providing help is a "reasonable burden" – when it can take place "especially without putting yourself in substantial danger or neglecting other important duties". Not being explicitly asked to help is not an acceptable reason not to do so. In a traffic crash, for example, the actions expected would be securing the site against follow-up crashes, calling emergency services, and providing first aid to your ability until professional help arrives.

=== India ===
The Bharatiya Nyaya Sanhita has a provision under Section 106 (2) that attracts punishment of up to 10 years for drivers and a fine of Rs 7 lakh or $8,400 who cause a serious road accident by negligent driving and run away without informing the police or any official from the administration.

=== Macau ===
Abandoning the victim of a crash can lead to a fine or imprisonment for up to 3 years.

=== New Zealand ===
A driver's duties in the event a motor vehicle crash is outlined in section 22 of the Land Transport Act 1998. Section 22(1) states that drivers involved in a crash must stop and ascertain whether a person has been injured, and must render all practicable assistance to any injured persons. Section 22(2) through 22(5) set out the requirements to supply driver, owner and vehicle details to police, other involved drivers and affected property owners.

If a driver leaves the scene of a crash in contravention of section 22(1), the driver is liable for up to 3 months' imprisonment or a NZ$4,500 fine, and must be disqualified from driving for a minimum of 6 months. If a person is injured and killed, the penalty increases to up to 5 years' imprisonment or a NZ$20,000 fine, and the mandatory disqualification increases to a minimum of 12 months.

=== South Korea ===
Hit-and-run is outlined in Article 5-3 of the Act on the Aggravated Punishment, etc. of Specific Crimes. There are two sections to this Act.

If the driver runs away after killing or causing the death of a victim, Section 1 proscribes the minimum sentence as five years in prison (with a possible 5 million-30 million won fine) with the maximum being life imprisonment.

If the driver removes the victim from the crash scene and runs away after abandoning the victim, Section 2 proscribes a minimum of three years imprisonment if the victim survives. If the victim dies, the penalty is either life imprisonment or the death penalty.

=== Taiwan ===
==== Administrative penalties ====
Article 62 of the Act Governing the Punishment of Violation of Road traffic Regulations proclaimed on 28 December 2005 and effective on 1 July 2006 provides the following administrative penalties:

Section 1: Without personal injury and death, hit-and-run drivers of motor vehicles are subject to administrative fines of 1000 to 3000 new Taiwan dollars and suspension of their driver licenses for 1 to 3 months.

Section: 4: With minor personal injury, hit-and-run drivers of motor vehicles are subject to revocation of their driver licenses, for 1 year pursuant to Section 3 of Article 67. With serious personal injury or death, hit-and-run drivers of motor vehicles are subject to revocation of their driver licenses, for lifetime pursuant to Section 1 of Article 67, but Article 67-1 allows a possible waiver after serving the revocation for 12 years if the revocation involved personal death, or 10 years if involving serious personal injury.

==== Criminal penalty ====
With personal injury or death, hit-and-run drivers of motor vehicles are also subject to imprisonment of 6 months to 5 years pursuant to Article 185-4 of the Criminal Code of the Republic of China. Although committing a hit and run is illegal, the crime is seldom prosecuted on Taiwan. Drunk driving has a much more severe penalty so drunk drivers involved in crashes rarely stop to be tested.

==== Case law ====
On 13 September 1991 in the Taiwan Area, the Judicial Yuan of the Republic of China in its Interpretation 284 considered that revoking a driver license for vehicular hit and run involving personal injury or death would not violate the Constitution of the Republic of China.

On 19 October 2001 in the Taiwan Area, the Judicial Yuan of the Republic of China in its Interpretation 531 further considered that lifetime revocation of a driver license for vehicular hit and run involving personal injury or death would not violate the Constitution of the Republic of China. However, this Interpretation also suggested relevant authorities in charge to reconsider the lifetime revocation and consider reinstatement for rehabilitated drivers.

=== United Kingdom ===
The Road Traffic Act 1988 requires a driver to stop if a crash has occurred due to the presence of their vehicle that results in injury to another person, livestock animal, dog, or damage to another's property. The driver must then give their name and address at the scene to anyone reasonably requiring it, and if there has been an injury to another person, they must produce their certificate of insurance to anyone reasonably requiring it. Anyone failing to stop or provide such details must report the incident in person to a police station or police constable as soon as practicable, and in all cases within 24 hours.

Failing to stop, and failing to report, carry a maximum sentence of 6 months in imprisonment, a £5000 fine and a driving ban.

=== United States ===
The penalties (and the definition) of hit-and-run vary from state to state in the United States. For example, in Virginia, the crime is a felony if the crash causes death, injury, or damage to attended property in excess of a certain dollar amount; otherwise, it is a misdemeanor. In California, the crime can be an infraction, a misdemeanor, or a felony depending on whether there is property damage or bodily injury.

In Texas, the crime is a third degree felony if the collision involves a fatality or serious bodily injury. Collisions causing less serious injuries are punishable by imprisonment in the Texas Department of Criminal Justice for not more than five years, or confinement in the county jail for not more than one year, a fine not to exceed $5,000, or both. Collisions causing $200 or more in total damages without injuries are punishable by a class B misdemeanor, and collisions causing less than $200 in total damages are a class C misdemeanor.

In New York, leaving the scene of an incident without reporting it is a traffic infraction, and if personal injury is involved, then it becomes a misdemeanor. There are also significantly higher fines if an animal is injured in the hit and run crash.
