= Ticket fixing =

Ticket fixing is a practice in which a public official destroys or dismisses a pending traffic ticket as a favor to a friend or family member. For example, police officers in a number of jurisdictions have been charged with destroying pending tickets at the request of other officers. Some police unions laud and encourage ticket fixing, including the New York City Police Benevolent Association, which argues that ticket fixing is not criminal, but rather "long standing practice at all levels of the [New York Police Department]."

Judges have also been accused of ticket fixing. Some police officers consider it a "professional courtesy" extended to friends and relatives of police officers. However, the practice is unpopular with the general public, and is illegal in most jurisdictions.

== United States ==
Allegations of ticket fixing have cropped up for decades in jurisdictions around the United States, including Georgia, Alabama, New York City, and San Diego.

In 1986, officers of the Georgia State Patrol faced charges of ticket fixing. In 1999, an investigation revealed widespread ticket-fixing in Alabama. In 2004, Santa Clara County judge William Danser faced charges of fixing tickets and reducing drunk driving sentences for "South Bay athletes, golfing buddies and friends of friends."

On October 27, 2011, at least 11 New York police officers were charged with offenses related to ticket fixing. Since then, New York prosecutors have maintained an unofficial list of police officers who are considered unreliable in court due to their involvement in ticket fixing. By 2021, there were 664 names on the list.

Three clerks in the San Francisco government faced ticket fixing accusations in 2012. Two police officers were charged with ticket fixing in Garden Grove, CA, in 2012.

== See also ==
- Police corruption
- Selective enforcement
