= Traffic ticket =

Type of notice issued by a law enforcement official

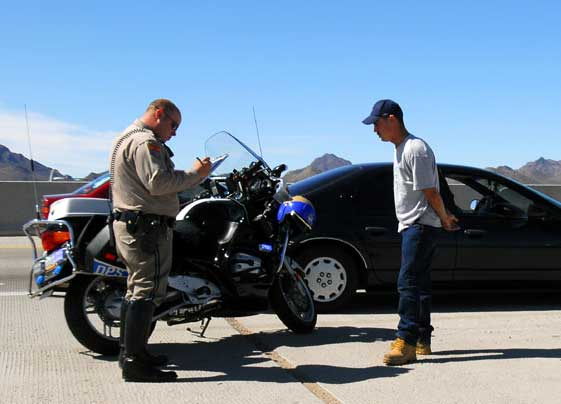
A motor officer writes a traffic ticket for a motorist accused of speeding.

A traffic ticket is a notice issued by a law enforcement official to a motorist or other road user, indicating that the user has violated traffic laws. Traffic tickets generally come in two forms, citing a moving violation, such as exceeding the speed limit, or a non-moving violation, such as a parking violation, with the ticket also being referred to as a parking citation, or parking ticket.

In some jurisdictions, a traffic ticket constitutes a notice that a penalty, such as a fine or accumulation of “points”, has been or will be assessed against the driver or owner of a vehicle; failure to pay generally leads to prosecution or to civil recovery proceedings for the fine. In others, the ticket constitutes only a citation and summons to appear at traffic court, with a determination of guilt to be made only in court.

== Australia ==
In Australia, traffic laws are made at the state level, usually in their own consolidated Acts of Parliament which have been based upon the Australian Road Rules.

=== New South Wales ===
Traffic tickets are known as Traffic infringement notices (TIN's) in New South Wales. Transport for NSW maintains a database of all registered holders of a driver's license in NSW, including the driver's traffic history and registered motor vehicles.

- Owner issued infringements

Transport for NSW maintain a number of fixed, and mobile, speed cameras and red light cameras across the State. The State Debt Recovery Office (SDRO) manages the processing and issuing of traffic tickets detected and issued by these devices. These tickets are deemed to be 'owner onus' tickets with the vehicles registered owner deemed liable unless they nominate another driver via statutory declaration.

- Driver issued infringements

These are generally issued 'on the spot' by a police officer although there are other authorised officers that can issue traffic infringements such as Transport for NSW heavy vehicle inspectors and Traffic Commanders. The infringement notice is written on three carbonised pieces of printed paper, known as Part A, B and C. Part A is the original and is sent to the State Debt Recovery Office (SDRO) by the issuing officer when they return to the station, Part B stays in the infringement book for accountability and Part C is given to the accused person at the scene or via post. Infringement notices issued by Councils or Commercial Clients by way of electronic handheld devices still have as associated application for details provided on a copy of the Part A, to be made available for perusal if required.

In New South Wales, all Traffic infringement notices (TIN's) and Parking Infringement Notices (PIN's) are part of the Self-Enforcing Infringement Notice Scheme (SEINS). This scheme aims to minimize Court time for people who wish to plead guilty. The accused person can either elect to pay/part pay the infringement by way of a number of online means or through Australia Post, this can be found on the ticket. If the Accused person pays the infringement, they are deemed to have pleaded guilty and any demerit points will be deducted from their driver's licence. Matters only go to Court if the accused person elects to have the matter heard at Court.

If the accused person wishes to plead not guilty, they fill the reverse side of Part C out and mail it to the State Debt Recovery Office (SDRO). Once this is done, a Court date is set for hearing before a Magistrate and the officer is notified. The officer creates a brief of evidence and provides this to the Court and the accused person, this contains a copy of Part A, which includes the facts of the matter i.e. observations and contemporaneous notes, including description of vehicle, and whether or not any photographs of an offending vehicle have been taken. Quite often, an officer will indicate that they have taken only (1) photograph of a vehicle then, when a matter is defended in court and the prosecution provide a brief of evidence with anything up to 4-5 extra photographs this can lead to some of the photographs being excluded as evidence because there is no indication to show on the Part A that they were taken at the time of the offence.

Upon being issued a traffic infringement, or parking infringement notice, (in person or to a vehicle) an accused person will generally receive a penalty reminder notice in the mail approximately 28 days later, if the fine remains unpaid.

Under the Fines Act of 1996 (NSW) Time for service of penalty reminder notices by post, is (7) days unless it is established that it was not served within (7) days. A due date for payment of Penalty Reminder notices under this Act is (21) days after it is served. Generally from the date of an offence approximately (28) days is given, after which time of the due date they will then have approximately an additional 21 days in which to take action, and finalise the matter. This includes (7) to allow for service, and (14) days for action to be taken.

If the fine is not actioned by the due date on the penalty reminder notice, an enforcement order will be issued and additional costs apply. If the enforcement order remains unpaid further enforcement action can follow, which may include suspension of the persons driver licence and/or vehicle registration, restrictions on conducting business with Transport for NSW, garnisheeing of wages, property seizure order or a community service order and additional fees.

== Canada ==
=== Outline of traffic offences ===
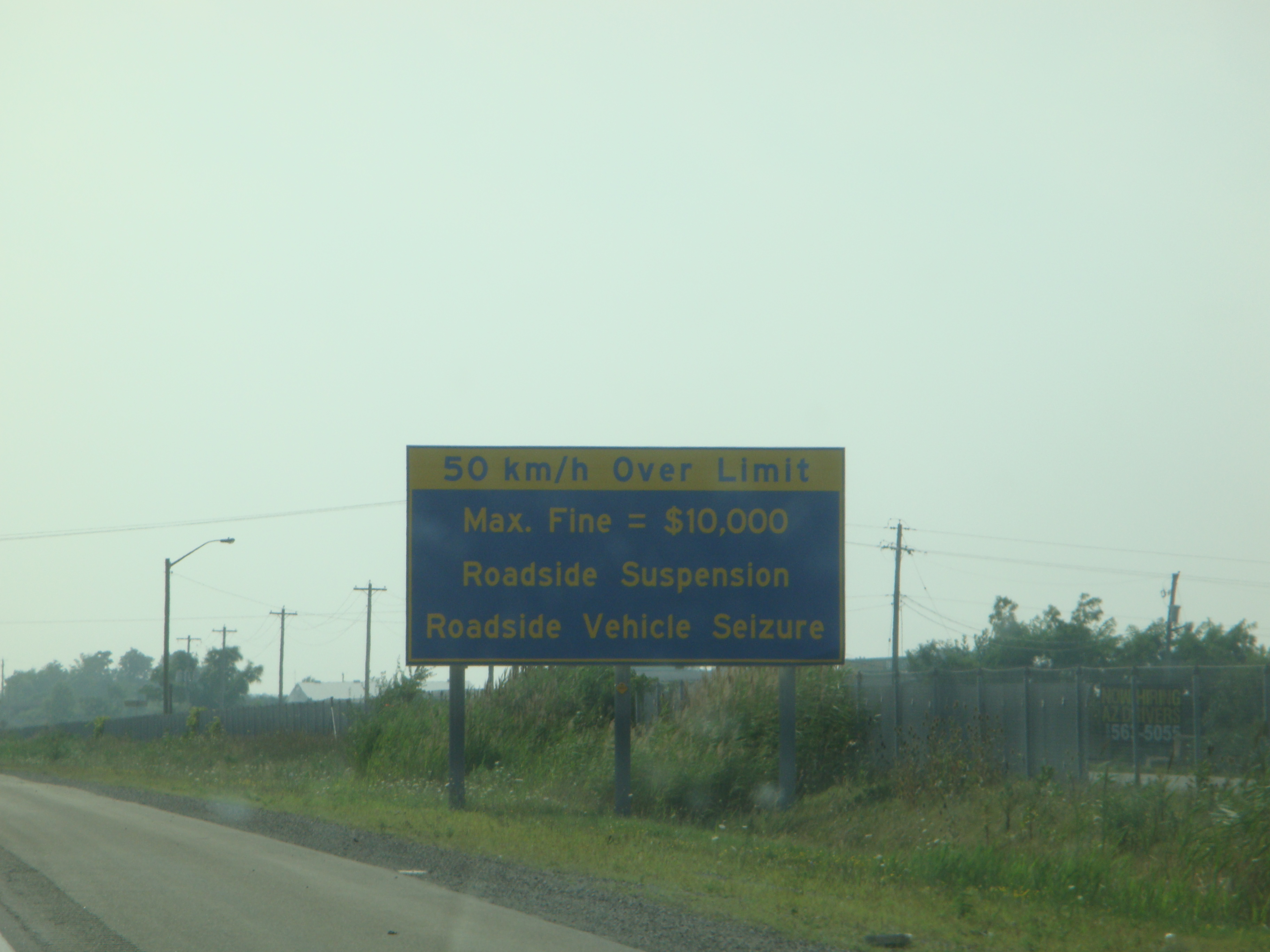
A sign on the Queen Elizabeth Way in Ontario, Canada, warning of a $10,000 fine, a roadside licence suspension, and a roadside vehicle seizure if motorists exceed the speed limit by 50 km/h or more

In Canada, most traffic laws are made at the provincial level. However, some serious violations are criminal offences, contrary to the federal Criminal Code. Both levels of government may deal with different aspects of the same misconduct. For example, drinking and driving may be a criminal offence of driving while impaired, or driving with a blood alcohol level greater than .08. At the same time, most provinces have laws specifying administrative penalties for driving with a blood alcohol level which does not exceed the criminal blood alcohol level of .08, in particular for newly licensed drivers.

Each province maintains a database of motorists, including their convicted traffic violations. Upon being ticketed, a motorist has a chance to plead guilty or not guilty with an explanation. The motorist or their representative must attend the court for the town or city in which the violation took place to do so.

If the motorist pleads not guilty, a trial date is set and both the motorist, or a lawyer/paralegal representing the motorist, and the ticketing officer, are required to attend. If the officer fails to attend, the court judge will often find in favour of the motorist and dismiss the charge, although sometimes the trial date is moved to give the officer another chance to attend. In some provinces, officers are now paid time and a half to attend traffic proceedings. The court will also make provisions for the officer or the prosecutor to achieve a deal with the motorist, often in the form of a plea bargain. If no agreement is reached, both motorist and officer, or their respective representatives, formally attempt to prove their case before the judge or Justice of Peace, who then decides the matter.

If the motorist pleads guilty, the outcome is equivalent to conviction after trial. Upon conviction, the motorist is generally fined a monetary amount and, for moving violations, is additionally given demerit points, under each province's point system. Jail time is sometimes sought in more serious cases such as racing or stunt driving.

=== The Demerit Point System in Ontario ===
In the province of Ontario, drivers who are convicted of certain driving related offences result in demerit points recorded onto their driving records. It is commonly misconceived that drivers actually "lose" points owing to convictions for certain traffic offences. In fact, a driver begins with zero demerit points and accumulates demerit points for convictions. Demerit points stay on a driver's record for two years from the original offence date. If a driver accumulates enough points, a suspension/loss of licence can occur.

For a fully licensed driver in Ontario, the accumulation of six demerit points results in a "warning" letter. At nine points, the driver is scheduled a mandatory interview to discuss their record and give specific reasonings as to why the licence should not be suspended. If a driver fails to attend this meeting, their licence may be automatically suspended. At 15 or more points, a driver's licence will be suspended for 30 days. Surrendering a licence to the Ministry of Transportation is mandatory at this stage; failure to surrender the licence may result in a suspension/loss for up to two years.

== Ireland ==
In the Republic of Ireland, a traffic ticket (which is mailed out to the driver) is in the form of a notice alleging that some crime – traffic offences are all criminal offences – has been committed, but stating that if a payment of a certain amount is made to the Garda Síochána within 28 days, or the amount increased by 50% is paid within 56 days, the driver will not be prosecuted for the alleged offence. Some tickets carry penalty points as well as the fine.

== Nordic countries ==
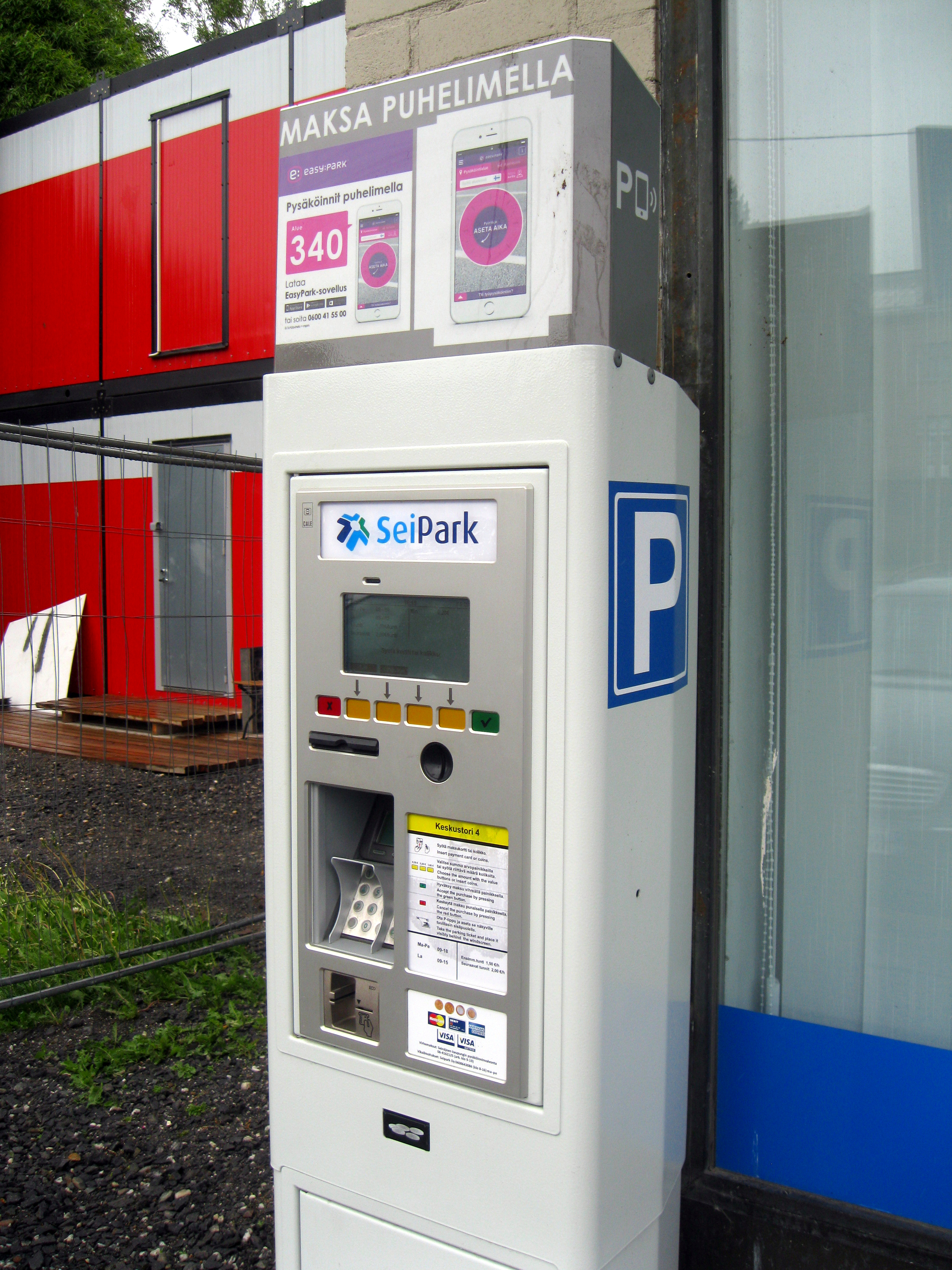
A parking ticket machine in Seinäjoki, Finland

Most Nordic countries determines some traffic fines based on income. For example, Finland's system for calculating fines starts with an estimate of the amount of spending money a Finn has for one day, and then divides that by two. The resulting number is considered a "reasonable" amount of spending money to deprive the offender of. Then, based on the severity of the crime, the system has rules for how many days the offender must go without that money. For example, driving about 15 mph over the speed limit results in a multiplier of 12 days. Most reckless drivers pay between $30 and $50 per day, for a total of about $400 or $500. In 2002, a Nokia executive was fined the equivalent of $103,000 for driving at 75 km/h (47 mph) in a 50 km/h (31 mph) zone on his motorcycle. Estonia is experimenting with a "time out" in lieu of fines: the motorist waits at the side of the road for 45 minutes or an hour.

== United States ==
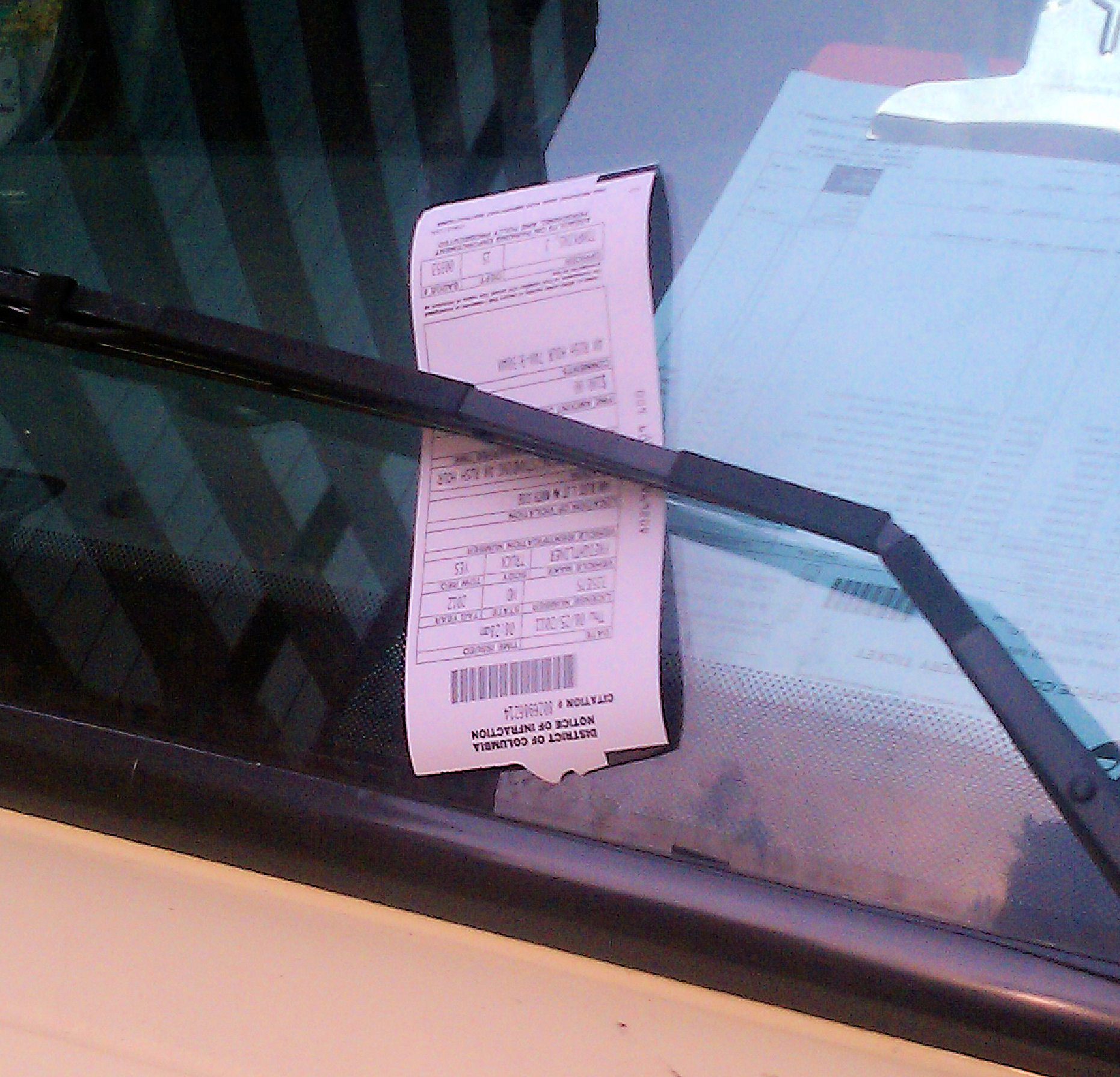
A parking ticket issued in Washington, D.C., in 2011

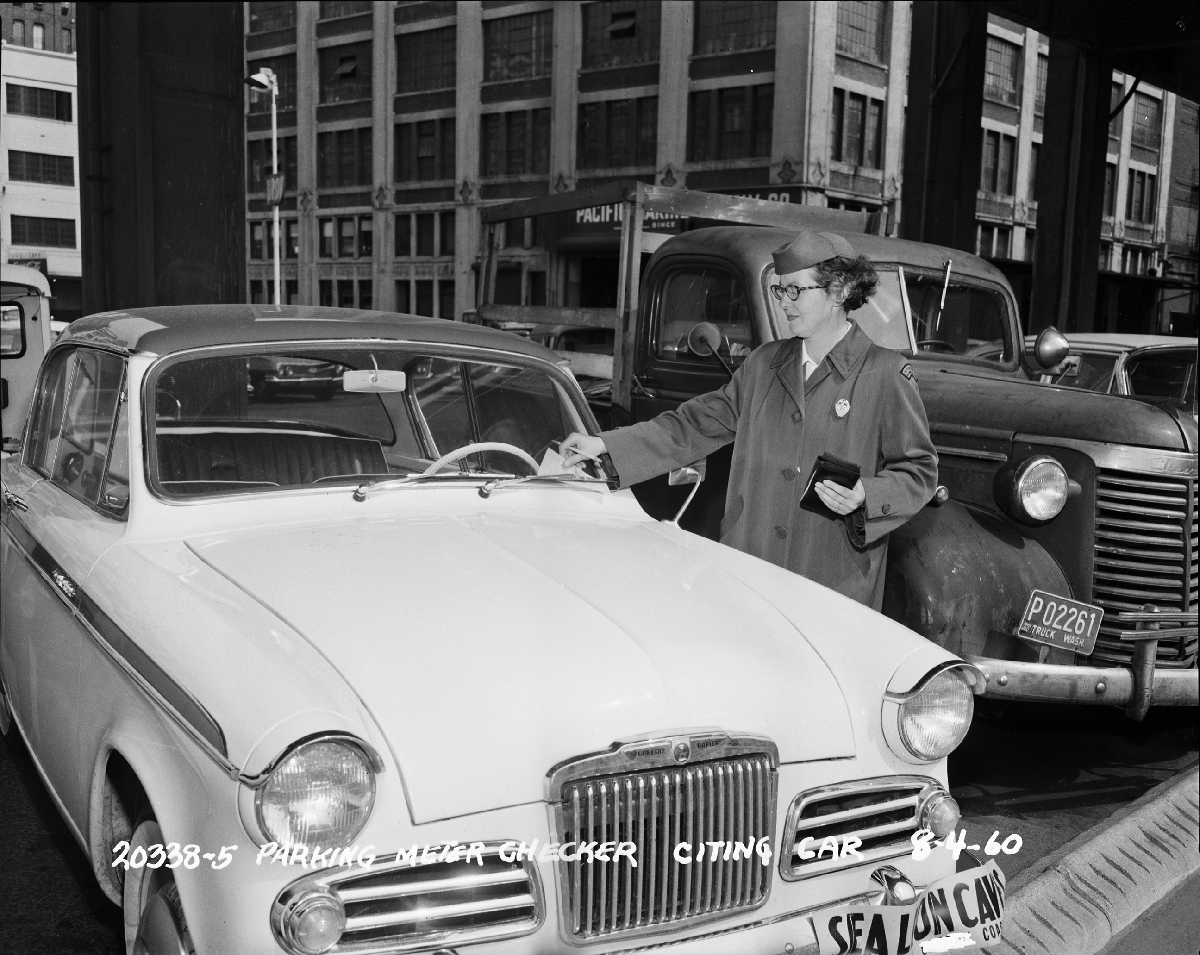
Checker giving a parking ticket, Seattle Washington, 1960

In the United States, most traffic laws are codified in a variety of state, county and municipal laws or ordinances, with most minor violations classified as infractions, civil charges or criminal charges. The classification of the charge depends on the violation itself as well as the jurisdiction, with infractions, civil charges and criminal charges relating to different standards of proof, trial rules and punishments.

=== Traffic violations ===
What constitutes a "minor violation" or infraction varies, examples include non-moving violations, defective or improper vehicle equipment, seat belt and child-restraint safety violations, and insufficient proof of license, insurance or registration. A trend in the late 1970s and early 1980s also saw an increased tendency for jurisdictions to re-classify certain speeding violations as civil infractions. In contrast, for more "serious" violations, traffic violators may be held criminally liable, accused of a misdemeanor or even a felony. Serious violations tend to involve multiple prior offenses, willful disregard of public safety, death or serious bodily injury, or damage to property. A frequently used penalty is a fine, and this is ordinarily a fixed amount of money, instead of being an amount of money determined based on the facts of each individual case.

=== Contesting a ticket ===
If the motorist wishes to contest a traffic infraction, a hearing can be set by the court upon proper request. The hearings are before a magistrate or judge depending on the state or city. Hearing dates may potentially be adjourned, and witnesses or police officers may be subpoenaed to appear in court.

At any point after the issuance of a ticket, a motorist may retain an attorney to represent them in a traffic infraction. Retaining or consulting an attorney may be beneficial to the motorist because an attorney would better understand how to contest an infraction in any given state or municipality. Attorneys may offer full representation in court, taking a case from inception to disposal and potentially appeals, although it may be possible for a defendant to retain a lawyer to discuss legal options, identify important defenses, and determine a defense strategy without hiring the lawyer to provide in-court representation.

The motorist may be given the opportunity to schedule a hearing for a time at which the subpoenaed ticketing officer is unable to attend. If the officer or representative fails to attend the trial for a civil infraction, the trial court may adjourn the hearing to a date upon which the officer is able to appear or, particularly if good cause is not shown for the officer's absence, the court judge may dismiss the charge.

Although each judge, state, county or municipality handle contested hearings a little differently, the court may make provisions for the prosecutor to achieve a deal with the motorist, often in the form of a plea bargain that may reduce the impact from that which would be incurred from pleading guilty without attending court. If no agreement is reached, and the prosecutor feels it is worth his time to charge the motorist, both motorist and officer, or their respective representatives, formally attempt to prove their case before the judge, who then decides the matter.

In some states and for criminal traffic violations, the judge may also order a jury trial, in which case a jury will hear arguments from both sides, and then consider the facts in the case and render a verdict. The motorist may, for example, put forward a reason their alleged violation was justified, such as to "get out of the way of an ambulance or avoid a collision with another motorist", and call into doubt the level to which the officer recalls the specific details of the situation among the many tickets they have issued.

In Washington state, there is a local option for courts to permit a decision on written statements, without the officer's live appearance in court. California offers a procedure in which both the officer and the ticketed driver may appear in writing, through a Trial by Written Declaration.

Some states permit challenging a traffic infraction through a written statement instead of appearing in court. For example, California's Vehicle Code Section 40902 permits individuals to obtain a trial by written declaration instead of making an in-court appearance.

=== Driving records ===
Each state's Department of Motor Vehicles or Bureau of Motor Vehicles maintains a database of motorists, including their convicted traffic violations. Upon being ticketed, a motorist is given the option to mail into the local court or the court for the jurisdiction in which the violation is alleged—a plea of guilty, not guilty or nolo contendere within a certain time frame (usually ten to fifteen days, although courts generally provide leniency in this regard). Additionally, the motorist can request a mitigation hearing, which acknowledges that the driver is guilty of a moving violation, but is requesting a hearing with a judge to reduce the fines associated with the ticket.

If the motorist pleads guilty, the outcome is equivalent to a conviction after the hearing. Upon conviction, the motorist is generally fined a monetary amount and, for moving violations, is additionally assessed a penalty under each state's point system. Wyoming being an exception as there is no motor vehicle point system. If a motorist is convicted of a violation in a state other than the state in which the motorist is registered, information about the ticket is relayed in accord with state policy and agreements between the two states, including the Non-Resident Violator Compact. If the ticket information is not abstracted to the state in which the motorist is licensed, then the record of the conviction remains local to the state where the violation took place.

=== Ticket fixing ===
The practice of ticket fixing by police officers is a recurring source of controversy in the United States. Police officers in many jurisdictions surreptitiously cancel tickets as a "professional courtesy" to the friends and family of other police officers. This practice is not legal in most jurisdictions, but enforcement is often lax, leading to periodic scandals.

== Ticket superlatives ==
There are many competing claims as to the first speeding ticket ever issued depending whether the claim goes by the first traffic violation or the first paper ticket ever issued. Great Britain may have the earliest claim with the first person to be convicted of speeding, Walter Arnold of East Peckham, Kent, who on 28 January 1896 was fined for speeding at 8 mph (13 km/h) in a 2 mph (3.2 km/h) zone. He was fined 1 shilling plus costs. A New York City cab driver named Jacob German was arrested for speeding on May 20, 1899 for driving 12 miles per hour on Lexington Avenue in Manhattan. In Dayton, Ohio, police issued a paper ticket to Harry Myers for going twelve miles per hour on West Third Street in 1904.

Another early speeding ticket was issued in 1910 to Lady Laurier, the wife of Wilfrid Laurier, Prime Minister of Canada, in Ottawa, Ontario, Canada, for exceeding the 10 miles per hour speed limit.

The fastest convicted speeder in the UK was Daniel Nicks, convicted of 175 mph (282 km/h) on a Honda Fireblade motorcycle in 2000. He received six weeks in jail and was banned from driving for two full years. The fastest UK speeder in a car was Timothy Brady, caught driving a 3.6-litre Porsche 911 Turbo at 172 mph (277 km/h) on the A420 in Oxfordshire in January 2007 and jailed for 10 weeks and banned from driving for 3 years.

The most expensive speeding ticket ever given is believed to be the one given to Jussi Salonoja in Helsinki, Finland, in 2003. Salonoja, the 27-year-old heir to a company in the meat-industry, was fined 170,000 euros for driving 80 km/h in a 40 km/h zone. The uncommonly large fine was due to Finnish speeding tickets (when excess speed is considerable) being relative to the offender's last known income. Salonoja's speeding ticket was not the first ticket given in Finland reaching six figures.

== Countries that use a point system ==
- Argentina
- Australia – see also List of demerit points in New South Wales
- Bosnia and Herzegovina
- Brazil
- Canada (only in some provinces)
  - Alberta
  - Ontario
  - Québec
  - New Brunswick
- China, People's Republic of – see also Road Traffic Safety Law of the People's Republic of China
  - Hong Kong
- China, Republic of
- Czech Republic
- France
- Germany
- Greece
- Hungary
- Iceland
- Ireland
- Israel
- Italy
- Latvia
- Mexico
- Morocco
- Netherlands
- New Zealand
- Norway
- Panama
- Poland
- Portugal
- Qatar
- Romania
- Serbia
- Singapore
- Spain
- United Kingdom
- United States - Only the following states:
  - Alabama
  - Alaska
  - Arizona
  - California
  - Colorado
  - Connecticut
  - Florida
  - Georgia
  - Illinois
  - Indiana
  - Kentucky
  - Maryland
  - Massachusetts
  - Michigan
  - Missouri
  - Nebraska
  - New Mexico
  - Nevada
  - New Jersey
  - New York
  - North Carolina
  - Ohio
  - Pennsylvania
  - South Carolina
  - Tennessee
  - Texas
  - Virginia
  - West Virginia
  - Wisconsin

== See also ==
- Assigned risk
- Automobile costs
- DoNotPay (mobile app for contesting tickets)
- Traffic police
- State police
- Highway patrol
- Traffic warden
- Traffic stop
- Jaywalking
- Moving violation
- Point system (driving)
