= Online traffic school =

Driver's education completed over the Internet

Online traffic school (or Internet traffic school) refers to a traffic school course that is completed over the Internet. These courses are similar in content to a traditional classroom traffic school course; however, online traffic school allows students to complete the course in their own time and at their own pace. Internet traffic school programs were born out of the concept of “home-study” traffic school and the increasing popularity of the Internet for varied testing environments.

The main purpose of taking a traffic school course is to maintain a clean driving record, and preventing a negative point being added to your driving record. As a result, these points on your DMV record adversely affect vehicle insurance premiums, job opportunities and possible driver's license loss or suspension. The first "online traffic school" was approved in California in 1996.

== Course curriculum and environment ==
The length and content of an online / internet traffic school curriculum is based on the requirements of the state or court that has approved the course. Typically courses are 4–8 hours in length due to court requirements, others are dictated by word counts. California DMV is an example of a word count system.

In order to make the online delivery of the course more closely resemble that of a classroom setting, courses are created with security controls such as page timers, quizzes, security questions, videos and final exams. These not only prevent the course taker from skipping through the material too quickly, but they also force students to pay attention to the material being presented.

== State and court approval ==
While internet traffic school are becoming increasingly available throughout the US, there is much disagreement about the requirements governing these online courses. Rules for online traffic schools and their course material vary greatly from state to state and even sometimes from county to county.

The states of Missouri and Idaho, for example, have few rules governing online traffic schools. Other states, such as Texas, and California, have very specific requirements that include course length, delivery, student identity verification and student participation validation. This makes the online traffic school experience very different depending on the traffic violator's location. Florida also have specific rules governing online traffic schools and offers also mandatory insurance discounts and other benefits.

There are also still many states/courts that do not approve of any Internet traffic schools. However, as acceptance of this technology becomes more mainstream, it is expected that soon, the entire United States will become eligible.
