= Prayer for Judgement Continued =

A Prayer for Judgment Continued (PJC) is a judicial action unique to the U.S. state of North Carolina that allows a judge to acknowledge a defendant’s guilt without entering a formal judgment. This unique mechanism can prevent the imposition of certain penalties, such as fines or points on a driver’s license, offering defendants an opportunity to avoid some consequences of a conviction.

A PJC serves as a judicial reprieve where, despite a guilty plea or verdict, the court withholds final judgment. This deferment can result in the absence of typical penalties associated with the offense. For instance, in traffic violations, a PJC may mean no fines or points added to the offender’s driving record. However, court costs are generally still applicable.

== Eligibility ==
Not all offenses or individuals qualify for a PJC. Considerations include:

- Nature of the Offense: PJCs are commonly granted for minor traffic violations, such as speeding or running a red light. Serious offenses, including driving while intoxicated (DWI) or speeding more than 25 mph over the limit, are typically ineligible.
- Frequency of Use: An individual may be granted a PJC once every three years for insurance purposes and up to two PJCs every five years to avoid points on a driver’s license. These limitations often apply per household, not per individual.
- Commercial Drivers: Holders of commercial driver’s licenses are generally not eligible for a PJC, even for minor offenses.

== Implications ==
While a PJC can mitigate certain penalties, it does not erase the offense entirely. The record of the offense remains, and in some contexts, such as insurance assessments, it may still be considered. Additionally, if conditions are attached to the PJC—like community service or probation—it may be regarded as a final judgment.
