= Road Traffic Safety Law of the People's Republic of China =

Law of China

The Road Traffic Safety Law of the People's Republic of China (Chinese: 中华人民共和国道路交通安全法) is a law which was passed by the Standing Committee of the National People's Congress of the People's Republic of China on October 28, 2003, promulgated by Decree No. 8 of the President of the PRC Hu Jintao, and took effect on May 1, 2004, on all parts of mainland China (but not in Hong Kong and Macau which have their own judicial systems.) It is the People's Republic of China's first-ever law on road traffic safety, and was intended to address an alarmingly high traffic fatality rate, which is four or five times greater than other nations.

== Background ==
The new law has a number of focus points:

- Under the new law, when accidents occur between pedestrians or non-motorised vehicles and motor vehicles, except for the case where the pedestrian or the non-motorised vehicle deliberately causes the incident, the motorist must always bear responsibility. Responsibility for the motorist is reduced if the pedestrian or non-motorised side violated traffic laws.
- The new law enforces a vehicle insurance system. Insurance on motor vehicles is now compulsory instead of voluntary.
- It abolished a previous regulation which banned holders of driver's licences of the PRC driving rights on expressways until one year after they had held the licence.
- Expressway speed limits were increased from 110 km/h to 120 km/h.
- Even harsher penalties were put in place for drunk driving and driving by people who did not hold a valid driver's licence, or drove a vehicle without licence plates.
- Cases where drivers were speeding 50% in excess of the applicable speed limit will result in the revocation of the driver's licence.
- The penalty for hit-and-run accidents is permanent revocation of one's driver's licence.
- The pre-existing point system for penalties was integrated into the new law.
- Penalties are now higher, from the former RMB 200 up to RMB 2000. Also, provinces, municipalities and autonomous regions can only enact specific penalties within the given range. Previously, the nationwide maximum penalty was RMB 200, but areas like Beijing and Kunming had enacted laws mandating penalties in the thousands of RMB.

Beijing's own "implementation procedures" of the new traffic law was passed on October 22, 2004, after being the target of heavy controversy over the responsibilities of vehicle drivers and pedestrians, and a regulation limiting the lanes that can be used by novice drivers. These take effect on January 1, 2005.

According to Xinhua News Agency, "police officers are also reluctant to pull over drivers of military vehicles even if the drivers are breaking the law". According to the People's Daily, Chinese army and police seized thousands of fake military license plates and IDs.
