= Tales of Terror (disambiguation) =

Tales of Terror is a 1962 horror film

Tales of Terror may also refer to:

== Literature ==
=== Books ===
- Tales of Terror, a 1799 collection of folk ballads by Matthew Gregory Lewis
- Tales of Terror, an 1899 short story collection by J. E. Preston Muddock under the pseudonym Dick Donovan
- Tales of Terror, a 1925 short story anthology edited by Joseph Lewis French
- Tales of Terror, a 1943 short story anthology edited by Boris Karloff
- Tales of Terror, a 1980 short story anthology edited by Alfred Hitchcock with Eleanor Sullivan
- E. Nesbit's Tales of Terror, a 1983 short story collection by E. Nesbit, edited by Hugh Lamb
- Freddy Krueger’s Tales of Terror, a young adult novel series published in 1994–1995 by Tor Books as a spin-off of the A Nightmare on Elm Street series
- Tales of Terror, a 1997 short story collection by Christopher Pike

=== Comics ===
- Tales of Terror, an annual publication of EC Comics that ran from 1951–1953 for three issues
- Tales of Terror #1, a 1952 publication of Toby Press
- Tales of Terror, a 1985 publication of Eclipse Comics
- Ray Bradbury's Tales of Terror #1, a 1994 publication of Topps Comics based on the works of Ray Bradbury
- TKO Presents Tales of Terror, a 2021 publication of TKO Studios

== Music ==
- Tales of Terror (band), an American hardcore punk band
- Tales of Terror (Tales of Terror album), 1984

== Games ==
- Tales of Terror (role-playing game), a 1991 tabletop game

== See also ==
- Snow White: A Tale of Terror, a 1997 American dark fantasy gothic horror film
- A Tale of Terror, a 1803 three act play by Henry Siddons
- The Tale of Terror: A Study of the Gothic Romance, a 1921 work by Edith Birkhead
- Tales of Mystery and Imagination (disambiguation)
- Tales of Terror and Mystery, a 1922 short story collection by Arthur Conan Doyle those first half is titled Tales of Terror for the section devoted to six horror stories written by Doyle
- Terror Tales, the name of two American publications
- Trilogy of Terror (disambiguation)
