= Takeover (disambiguation) =

A takeover is the purchase of one company by another.

Takeover or Take Over may also refer to:

== Arts, entertainment, and media ==
=== Literature ===
- Take Over (James Bond), an unpublished 1970 James Bond novel purportedly written by Ian Fleming
- The Takeover (novel), a 1976 novel by Muriel Spark

=== Music ===
- The Takeover, a band which later became Innerpartysystem
- Take Over, a 2009 album by Aaron Shust
- Take Over (album), a 2013 album by KCee
- The Takeover (album), an album by Zion I
- The Takeover, an album by Lil' Flip
- "Takeover" (Jay-Z song), a 2001 song by rapper Jay-Z produced by Kanye West
- "Takeover", a 2011 song by Mizz Nina featuring Flo Rida
- "Takeover" (Lee Mvtthews song), a 2019 song by Lee Mvtthews featuring NÜ
- "Take Over", a 2014 song by Nick Jonas from his self-titled album
- "Take Over", a song from the game Persona 5 Royal, 2019
- "Take Over", a 2020 promotional single for the 2020 League of Legends World Championship
- "The Take Over", a 2007 song by Four Year Strong from Rise or Die Trying
- Takeover Entertainment, a former British music company
- Takeover Records, a punk rock record label

=== Film ===
- The Takeover (film), a 1995 American film
- Takeover (1988 film), a 1988 Australian film
- Takeover (2026 film), an upcoming American film

=== Other uses in arts, entertainment, and media ===
- NXT TakeOver, several events by WWE
- Takeover Radio, a British radio station
- The TakeOver, a 2019 video game

== Other uses ==
- Nick Schulman, known as Nick "The Takeover" Schulman, a poker player
- Takeover, the occupation of a building or other site as a form of protest
- IRC takeover, an acquisition of an Internet Relay Chat by an entity other than the channel's owner
- A promotional tactic in social media where a popular figure has control over an outside social media account or channel for a certain period to promote their work
- Sideshow, also known as a takeover or street takeover, is an informal demonstration of automotive stunts often held in vacant lots, and public intersections.
- Mall takeover an event in which people gather to record automobiles driving recklessly

== See also ==
- Regulatory capture, a government's policy takeover by non-government entity with a goal to suppress or change regulation beneficial to society's interests
- Failover, a term used in information technology for a High Availability
- Hijacking
- Hostile Takeover (disambiguation)
- Taking Over (disambiguation)
