= R v Verity-Amm =

South African legal case

In R v Verity-Amm, V was charged with driving a motor car recklessly or negligently in contravention of the Motor Vehicles Ordinance. Before the trial, V requested details of the alleged negligence but was refused such particulars. Before V pleaded, he applied to the court for further particulars and this application was also refused. V was convicted of the charge.

The magistrate stated in his reasons for judgment that he had refused to order particulars to be given because the charge had followed the wording of the section creating the offense, and he was therefore not entitled to order particulars.

He stated further that the appellant was not prejudiced, because the grounds of negligence upon which the Crown relied had emerged clearly from the evidence, and the appellant had had ample opportunity of preparing his defense during the period of the remand.

The court on appeal held that on a charge of driving a motor vehicle recklessly or negligently, the accused is entitled to be informed of the particulars of the alleged negligence if he asks for them.

Furthermore, it was held that where a court has, on improper grounds, refused to order particulars to be given to an accused in a case where such particulars ought to have been given, the prejudice to the accused is not necessarily cured by postponing the hearing at the conclusion of the Crown case so as to enable the accused to prepare his defense, because the accused will probably have been prejudiced in his cross-examination of the Crown witnesses if he was not fully acquainted with the case he had to meet.

The appeal succeeded and the conviction and sentence was set aside.

This case was decided under the old Criminal Procedure Act of 1917 which also provided that in charges of contravening a statutory enactment, it shall be sufficient if the description of the offense is in the words of the enactment and that it does not prevent the court from ordering particulars of the offense to be given by the Crown to the accused in a proper case.
