= Icon Park =

Entertainment complex in Florida

- Previously known as I-Drive 360 (2015–2018)

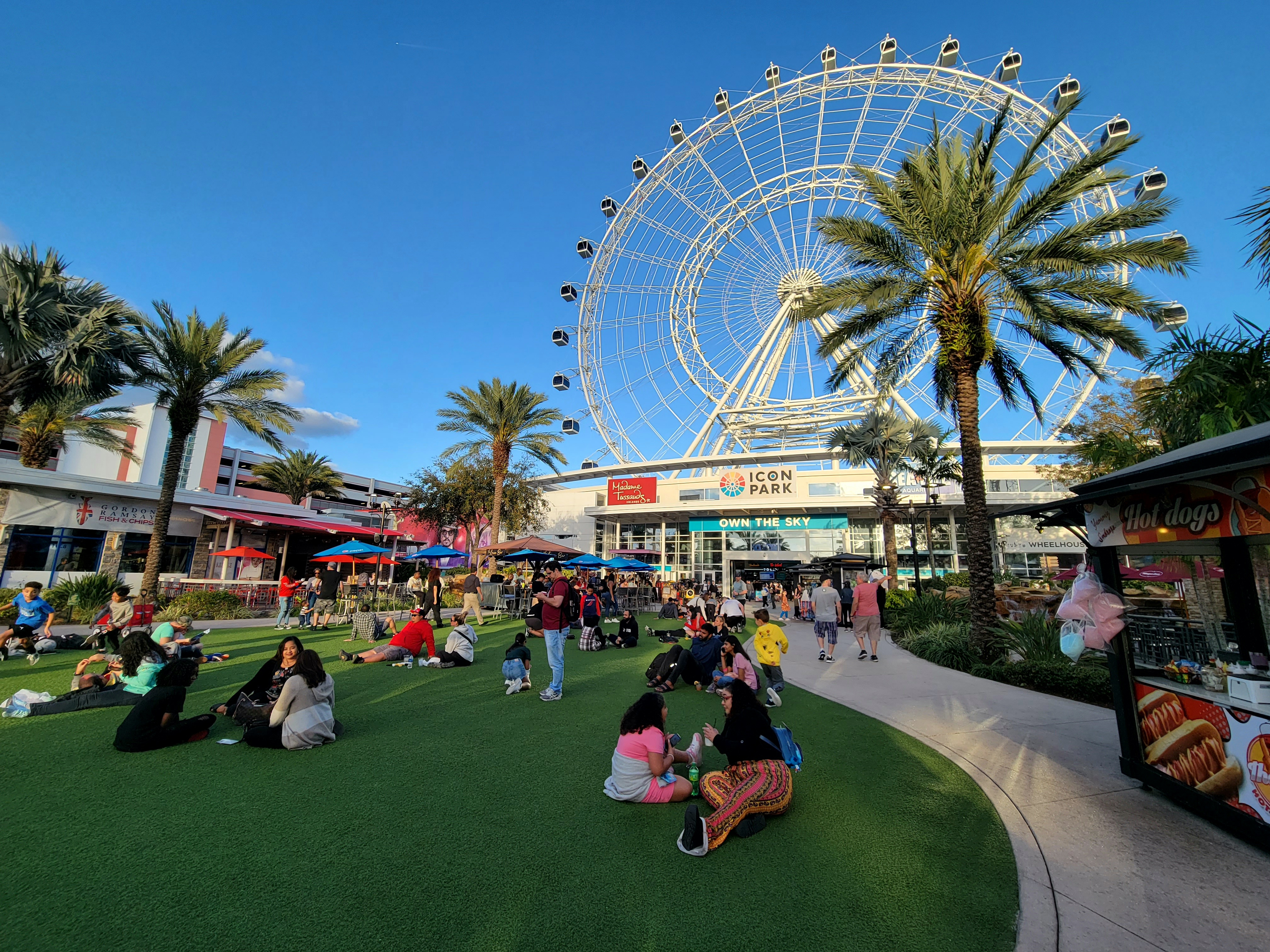
- The park green and the Wheel at Icon Park
- Interactive map of Icon Park
- Location: Orlando, Florida, United States
- Coordinates: 28.4432°N 81.4693°W
- Status: Operating
- Opened: May 4, 2015
- Owner: IDL Center (FL) LLC

Attractions
- Total: 9
- Website: www.iconparkorlando.com

Icon Park, originally named I-Drive 360 until 2018, is an entertainment complex in Orlando, Florida, that has been operating since 2015. The complex is on 20 acres (8 ha) and has nine featured attractions, including a 400-foot (120 m) observation wheel, a slingshot ride, a Madame Tussaud's Wax Museum, and a Sea Life aquarium. The park also has various restaurants, shops, bars, and kiosk vendors.

Icon Park is not owned and operated as a single enterprise like an ordinary enclosed amusement park; instead, the park is on a 40-acre (16 ha) site together with nearby hotels and restaurants, and the attractions at the site are owned separately and operated by various different companies who lease space and operate as tenants. No tickets are needed for members of the public to enter the park itself or to visit the restaurants and shops on the site; rather, tickets for the individual attractions are sold separately or in bundled packages.

== Attractions ==
=== Rides and activities ===
In addition to rides, the park features a museum, aquarium, arcade, a "7D" theater and a museum of illusions.

- Orlando Eye (the original name, although also previously operated under other names including the Wheel at Icon Park from 2019 to 2024), a Ferris wheel standing 400 feet (120 m) tall (owned by Merlin Entertainments since March 2024)
- Carousel on the Promenade
- Madame Tussaud's Wax Museum Orlando (owned by Merlin Entertainments)
- Orlando Slingshot – the tallest slingshot ride in the world, standing at 300 feet (91 m) tall, it vertically catapults two riders to a height up to 390 feet (120 m) in an open tubular steel cage using elastic ropes (owned by the Slingshot Group)
- Sea Life Aquarium Orlando (not to be confused with SeaWorld Orlando) (owned by Merlin Entertainments)
- Museum of Illusions Orlando
- In The Game / 7D Motion Theater
- Pearl Express Train, a locomotive ride around the Icon Park Promenade
- Max Action Arena, an entertainment center with virtual reality technology and adventure rooms that was announced in fall 2022.

The Orlando Starflyer, a 450-foot (140 m) swing ride, is located near Icon Park on the same road and is operated by the same Slingshot Group of companies that operates the Orlando Slingshot attraction. However, the Starflyer is not listed as an Icon Park feature attraction and has a separate website and street address.

=== Shopping ===
The park features more than 40 specialty retail kiosks around the Icon Park, as well as an original shop featuring park merchandise.

- Build-A-Bear Workshop
- The Sugar Factory
- The Wheelhouse Gift Shop
- Calenoi Sunglasses
- Icon Park Gifts
- Breathe: A Modern Wellness Bar
- CXI Currency Exchange

=== Restaurants ===
The park features various restaurants including

- Carrabba's Italian Grill
- Häagen-Dazs
- Outback Steakhouse
- Shake Shack
- Tin Roof: A Live Music Joint
- Blake Shelton's Ole Red
- Gordon Ramsay Fish & Chips
- Starbucks
- Sugar Factory
- Uncle Julio's Mexican
- iCafe de Paris
- Icon Park Sky Bar, Lawn Bar, Wheelhouse Bar
- Brother Jimmy's BBQ
- Juan Valdez Coffee Store

=== Former attractions ===
- The Orlando Free Fall (2021–2022): a 430-foot (130 m) drop tower – closed and dismantled after a fatal accident in 2022.
- Bullseye Blast (2022): a shooting game for riders of the wheel attraction to shoot at targets on nearby buildings, streetlamps, and parking lots, which proved controversial due to its resemblance to mass shooting incidents.
- Arcade City Orlando: an arcade closed in March 2021 after being replaced by the new In the Game arcade in the Icon Park Wheelhouse.

== Operations ==
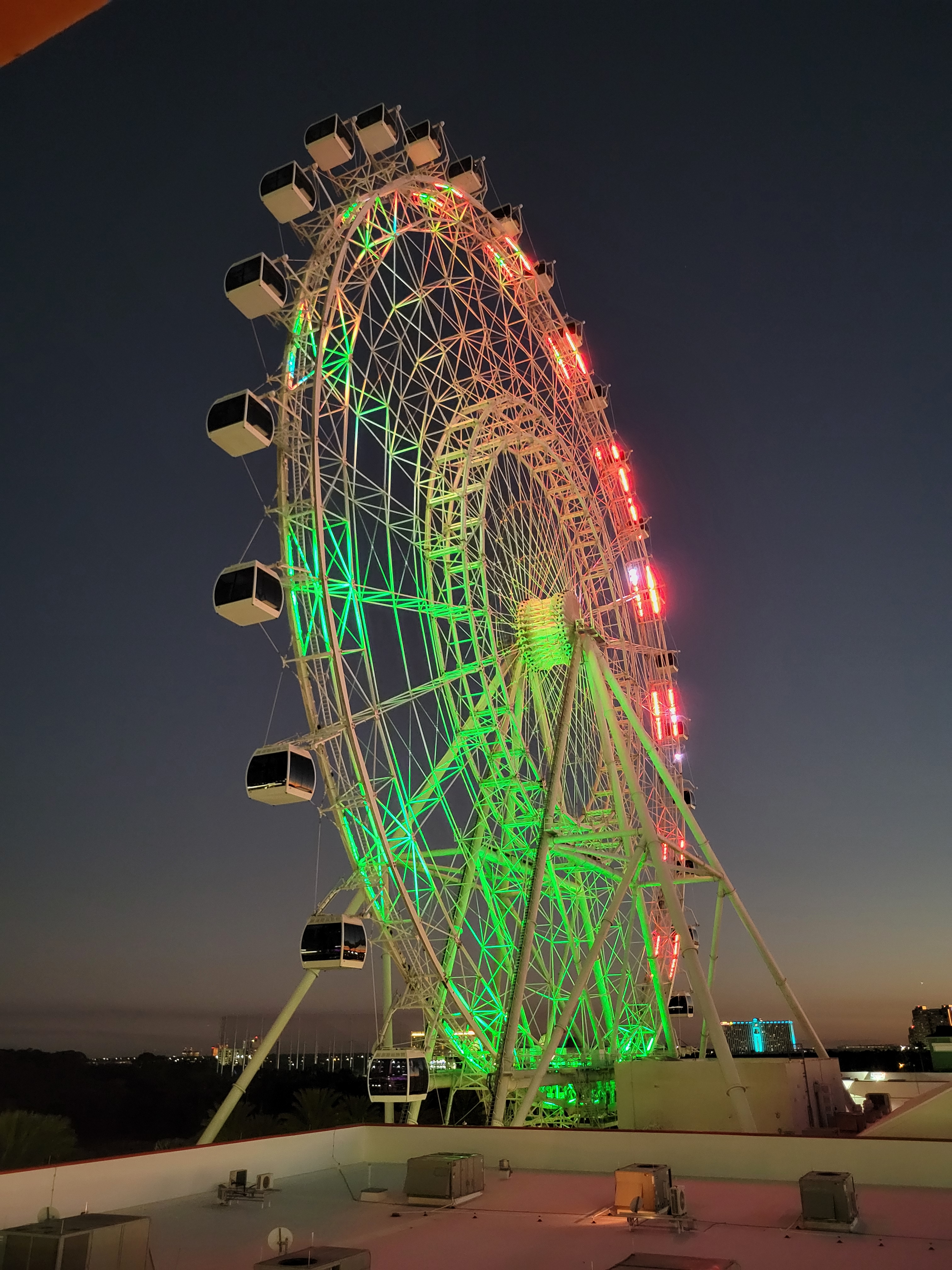
The Wheel at Icon Park (now called the Orlando Eye) at night

Icon Park began operating in 2015.

=== Incidents ===
On July 3, 2015, at around 4:00 p.m., a few months after operations began, the Orlando Eye Ferris Wheel experienced a technical fault with the system that monitors the wheel position, causing the system to automatically shut down and stranding about 66 riders for approximately three hours.

On March 24, 2022, 14-year-old Tyre Sampson of St. Louis, Missouri, fell to his death from the Orlando Free Fall ride. Owned and operated by The Slingshot Group, the attraction opened as the tallest free-standing drop tower, and operated for less than 3 months prior to the accident. The ride was immediately closed. Through an investigation and report provided by Quest Engineering and Failure Analysis, Inc., it was discovered that the restraint proximity sensors of the seat Sampson was in had been manually adjusted after they had been initially secured in place by the ride manufacturer. The manual adjustments had been made to accommodate larger riders. Sampson exceeded the weight limit for the ride that was prescribed by its manufacturer. The ride would not operate if the sensors detected that any of the restraints were not sufficiently closed, and the manual adjustment allowed the restraint to be open almost twice as wide as normal without triggering a shutdown. The expanded restraint for Sampson's seat left a large enough opening for him to slide out of the seat. On October 6, 2022, Icon Park confirmed the permanent closure of the ride, and the structure was dismantled in March 2023. In the wake of the accident, Florida governor Ron DeSantis signed the Tyre Sampson Act into law to improve rider safety. In December 2024, the victim's family were awarded $310 million in damages by an Orange County jury.

On December 31, 2022, the Wheel malfunctioned again and suffered from a power failure around 6:20 p.m. Orange County fire crews had to rescue more than 60 people from the ride. Despite reports of sparks, flames and some smoke, no injuries were reported. The ride remained closed until February 10, 2023.

On April 25, 2026, over 1,000 teens attended Icon Park for a "teen takeover" which resulted in almost a dozen arrests and two injured police officers that had to be hospitalized. After the event, Icon Park released a statement sharing a chaperone policy for all guests under the age of 18, stating that all guests under the age of 17 must be accompanied by someone 21 years of age or older.
