= Taking Over =

Taking Over may refer to:

- Taking Over (Overkill album), 1987
- Taking Over (Sizzla album) or the title song, 2001
- Taking Over (EP), by the King Blues, or the title song, 2007
- Taking Over, a 2008 one-man show by Danny Hoch
- Taking Over, an album by Astrid Bryan, 2009
- "Taking Over" (song), by Miles Kane, 2013
- "Taking Over", a Jme song from his 2015 album Integrity>
- "Taking Over" (Ever Decreasing Circles), a 1984 television episode

== See also ==
- Takeover (disambiguation)
- Taking Over Me (disambiguation)
