= Orlando Eye =

Ferris wheel in Orlando, Florida

Coordinates: 28.443198°N 81.468296°W

The Orlando Eye by Merlin Entertainments
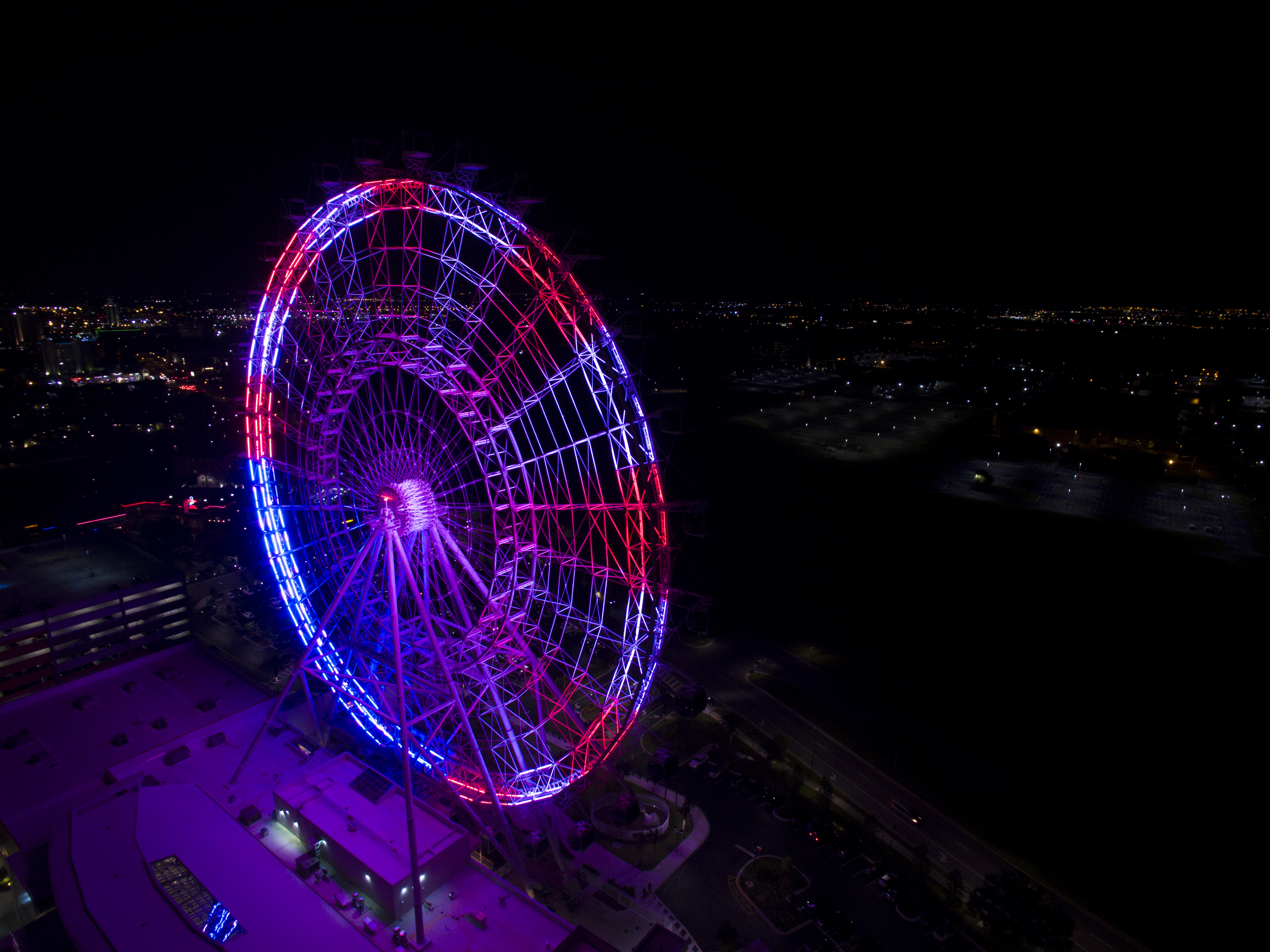
- The Orlando Eye on September 11, 2015
- Interactive map of the The Orlando Eye by Merlin Entertainments area

General information
- Type: Ferris wheel
- Location: 8401 International Drive; Orlando, Florida, U.S. 32819
- Construction started: 2012
- Completed: 2015
- Opened: May 4, 2015
- Owner: Merlin Entertainments

Height
- Height: 400 ft (120 m)

Dimensions
- Diameter: 390 ft (119 m)

Website
- www.theorlandoeye.com

The Orlando Eye by Merlin Entertainments is a 400-foot-tall (122 m) Ferris wheel at Icon Park in Orlando, Florida, United States. It opened on April 29, 2015.

The attraction was originally called the Orlando Eye, and was owned and operated by Merlin Entertainments, which also owns the London Eye Ferris wheel, the observation decks known as the Blackpool Tower Eye and the Sydney Tower Eye, and the Madame Tussaud's Wax Museum attractions. It was renamed the Coca-Cola Orlando Eye in 2016 and was then sold and renamed the Icon Orlando in 2018 and the Wheel at Icon Park Orlando in 2019. The 2018 renaming was accompanied by a re-branding of the surrounding property from I-Drive 360 to ICON Park. In 2024, the wheel was repurchased by Merlin Entertainments and renamed the Orlando Eye by Merlin Entertainments. The 2024 repurchase of the Ferris wheel was the first acquisition for Merlin Entertainments under the leadership of CEO Scott O'Neil, who joined the company in 2022.

== Design and construction ==
The Orlando Eye by Merlin Entertainments is described as an observation wheel because it "is a stabilized-driven (capsule) that gives you a really smooth experience on the way around, so it doesn't feel like when you're at 400 feet, that you're swinging around in mid-air". According to its official website, the Orlando Eye is the first wheel ever to use such a system in combination with a suspended "ski lift capsule design".

The wheel was reported to be in the early stages of planning in March 2011, with completion due in mid-2014, and was approved by county commissioners in September 2012.

In January 2013, it was reported that the expected opening date had been pushed back to "by Thanksgiving November 2014". Erection of the main support structure began in December 2013. In April 2014 it was reported that completion had been further delayed until early 2015.

Installation of the 30 air-conditioned passenger capsules, each of which can carry up to 15 people, began in mid-January 2015, and the last capsule was installed on February 5. In mid-February 2015, it was announced that the soft opening was scheduled for May 1, followed by a grand opening ceremony on May 4. The Orlando Eye carried its first official passenger—a 13-year-old leukemia patient—on April 29, 2015.

== Malfunctions ==
On July 3, 2015, at around 4:00 p.m., a few months after operations began, the eye experienced a technical fault with the system that monitors the wheel position, causing the system to automatically shut down, stranding about 66 riders for approximately three hours.

On December 31, 2022, the wheel malfunctioned and suffered from a power failure around 6:20 p.m. Orange County fire crews had to rescue more than 60 people from the ride. Despite reports of a small fire, no injuries were reported. The ride remained closed until February 10, 2023.

== Rebranding ==
On July 28, 2016, the Orlando Eye followed its London counterpart in becoming sponsored by Coca-Cola and was renamed the Coca-Cola Orlando Eye. The deal included the renaming of the Eye and four new "Surprise and Delight" capsules, which were branded capsules with a cooler of soda and selfie sticks.

On March 11, 2018, it was sold and rebrand as Icon Orlando. On April 4, 2019, it was rebranded once again to the Wheel at Icon Park.

In March 2024, the attraction was repurchased by Merlin Entertainments, and was renamed the Orlando Eye by Merlin Entertainments.
