= Hostile Takeover =

Hostile Takeover may refer to:

- Hostile takeover, the purchase of one business by another against the wishes of management

== Literature ==
- Hostile Takeover Trilogy, a science fiction trilogy by S. Andrew Swann
- Hostile Takeover: How Islam Impedes Progress and Threatens Society, a 2018 book by Thilo Sarrazin
- Hostile Takeover: Resisting Centralized Government's Stranglehold on America, a 2012 book by Matt Kibbe

== Television ==
- "Hostile Takeover" (Supergirl), an episode from the first season of Supergirl
- "Hostile Takeover" (CSI: Miami), an episode from the eighth season of CSI: Miami
- "Hostile Takeover" (Runaways), an episode of Runaways

== Music ==
- Hostile Takeover (album) by RBL Posse

== See also ==
- Hostyle Takeover, a 2016 album by Hostyle Gospel
- "Hostel Takeover", an episode from the seventh season of Hotel Impossible
- Hostile Makeover, a 2009 television film
- Takeover (disambiguation)
