= David Ferguson (impresario) =

American international outsider-culture impresario

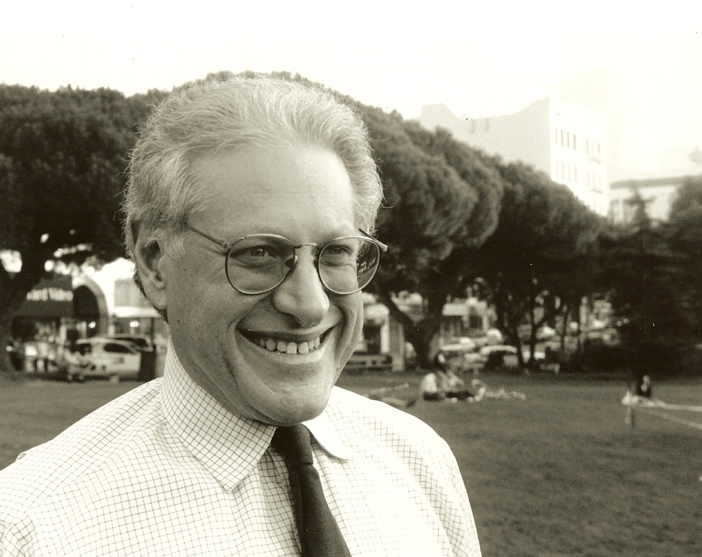
- Occupation: Promoter
- Website: CD Presents

David Ferguson was an American international outsider-culture impresario, activist, music producer and concert promoter. Over his career, most of which has been spent on the West Coast, he worked with musical acts such as the Avengers, John Lydon (a.k.a. Johnny Rotten), Billy Bragg, Iggy Pop, Bad Brains, Black Flag, and Butthole Surfers and visual artists Vaughn Bode, Jean-Michel Basquiat, and Barry McGee. Ferguson worked with multi-discipline artists such as avant-garde musician and spoken-word artist Lydia Lunch and the psychedelic drag queen performance group the Cockettes.

The San Francisco Chronicle referred to Ferguson as the "godfather of the unorthodox", adding that Ferguson "...not only thinks outside the box — he crushes it, dances on top of it, reinvents it and calls it whatever he likes. He has spent his life making trouble." The East Bay Express wrote, "David Ferguson's life story reads like an encyclopedia of the underground."

Ferguson founded and headed the Institute for Unpopular Culture, a San Francisco-based arts organization. Through IFUC, Ferguson has maintained his involvement in anti-war protests, an activism which dates back to his student days at the University of Miami in the 1960s.

== Early career ==
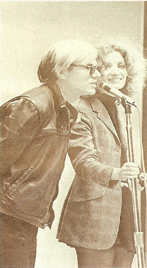
Andy Warhol & Viva, University of Miami, 1968.

Ferguson was co-leader of the Union of Students to End the War in Vietnam and his activism lead to discussions of disciplinary action, the outcome of which is not clear. Ferguson had also arranged for Pop Art icon Andy Warhol to speak at the campus in 1968, an event that led to a professional association between the two.

Ferguson moved to San Francisco in 1969 where he met the performance troupe the Cockettes, for whom he later produced and promoted live shows. Even in tolerant San Francisco, the Cockettes' performance antics presented thorny PR issues. A member of the group wrote about a tactic Ferguson used to sneak the troupe and its outrageous stage behavior by wary club owners:

For nearly 20 years, Mr. Bimbo [ Agostino Giuntoli, owner of Bimbo's] had presided over his lavish and busy supper club five nights a week, and he was nervous about renting the place out...In fact, he was so nervous about that prospect that he asked David Ferguson to sign an affidavit of sorts—on the back on an envelope—swearing that he would allow no naked women to perform onstage. It was only after seeing the show that Mr. Bimbo got the joke and realized how funny his prohibition was. 'David,' he said, as he approached the table, laughing. 'I can see that I have to be careful with you. You promised me no naked women, but you said nothing about naked men.'

Ferguson formed a lecture and appearance scheduling enterprise in 1973. Through the agency, he maintained an association with the Black Panther Party by representing Black Panther Party then-chairperson Elaine Brown. The agency also scheduled lectures for Jo Ann Little, Paul Krassner, Jerry Mander,and Beat poet Michael McClure. "Ferguson's personal punk legacy includes helping promote concerts in the early 1970s for Iggy Pop and the New York Dolls."

== CD Presents ==
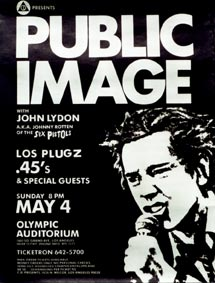
CD Presents poster for Public Image Ltd. concert, Los Angeles, 1980

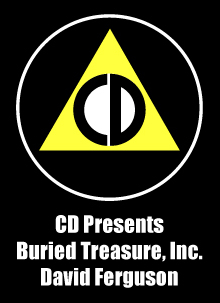
Logo of CD Presents

In 1979, Ferguson co-founded CD Presents as a concert promotion company. Ferguson's concert promotion career took an important turn when he was asked to produce West Coast shows for Public Image Ltd. during PiL's first two American tours (1980 and 1982). The 1980 show in Southern California proved not only a memorable event in PiL's career:

As it did at the Sex Pistols' farewell shoot-out in San Francisco two and a half years ago, history hung in the air the night Public Image Ltd. came to Los Angeles' Olympic Auditorium. (Rolling Stone, June 25, 1980, p. 92)

It also marked the first concert appearance of Los Lobos, known at the time as a Tejano mariachi wedding band.

In keeping with the group's image, PiL balked at major label promotion to back its tour, insisting instead on working with smaller, independent promoters. This led to the band's association with CD Presents, an informal partnership that put PiL and Ferguson on a collision course with music industry powers, most notably Bill Graham, head of the San Francisco-based Bill Graham Presents.

Graham held a virtual monopoly on concert promotion in Northern California and he stepped in on more than one occasion to postpone the San Francisco PiL show, ultimately maneuvering to persuade city officials to terminate the concert altogether. This battle played to Lydon's own reputation as an anti-establishment hell raiser: "We've got to play this gig," [Lydon] exclaimed. "It's everything we came here to do on this tour. We gave them six gigs for these two, and we'll see which ones come off the most successful. That's what they're really afraid of." Fearing riots if the PiL show was cancelled, city officials authorized CD Presents to proceed with the concert.

Either through the label or through its distribution system, CD Presents recorded, released or distributed the music of nearly 3,300 artists. In 1983, the label released a compilation of the Avengers' material popularly known as The Pink Album. Additionally, CD Presents released records from D.O.A, Butthole Surfers, and Tales of Terror. CD Presents released the San Francisco group the Offs' First Record (1984) with a Jean-Michel Basquiat-designed cover.

During the 1980s, CD Presents released three volumes of punk recording compilations titled Rat Music for Rat People (1988), a collection of songs previously released by Go Records! in 1982, featuring a number of the era's most notable punk bands: the Avengers, Dead Kennedys, Black Flag w/Henry Rollins, Circle Jerks, the Subhumans, and D.O.A. Vol. 2 (1984) showcased a number of Texas punk bands including, Butthole Surfers, Big Boys, the Dicks, MDC along with the Southern California hardcore band, Minutemen. Rat Music, Vol. 3 (1987) featured the Adolescents, Naked Raygun and Mojo Nixon. Vol. 3 also was one of the earliest records of producer/engineer Sylvia Massy (Johnny Cash, Red Hot Chili Peppers, and Tool's Undertow), who mixed and engineered a number of the tracks.

CD Presents released albums from artists in other genres besides punk, including the avant-garde musician, poet and actress Lydia Lunch and electronic and the experimental post punk act Minimal Man.

== Institute for Unpopular Culture ==
In 1989, Ferguson founded the Institute for Unpopular Culture (IFUC) as a non-profit organization to support artists outside the mainstream art world. "It is our aim to subvert all commercial avenues of art exploitation," Ferguson said. "It's not that we dislike people who own art galleries, we just think there could be a viable alternative." IFUC's stated mission is to discover and mentor outsider artists and creative people by assisting with public relations, business, counseling, opportunities, access to equipment, and funding for their projects.

Ferguson founded the Punk Rock Orchestra, a 50-plus member collaboration which recasts punk songs in an orchestral format. The orchestra has been featured on NPR and CBS Radio's The Osgood File. The PRO was voted San Francisco's Best Local Band in 2005 by readers of the SF Weekly.

The Institute has supported and been associated with a number of artists, including Obie-award-winning performance artist Holly Hughes and graffiti artist Barry McGee (a.k.a. "Twist"). Clinton Fein, founder of Annoy.com. Interns from the IFUC offered legal research in support of Fein's successful legal case against the U.S. government (ApolloMedia v. Reno) which challenged the constitutionality of the 1996 Communications Decency Act. IFUC has sponsored William Noguera, an artist who, since 1983 has been on death row at California's San Quentin State Prison and now creates photorealistic pointillist paintings with a rapidograph technical pen.
