= Blazing Wheels and Barking Trucks =

Compilation album by various artists
- Released: 1984
- Genre: Skate punk
- Label: High Speed Productions/Thrasher Magazine

Blazing Wheels and Barking Trucks is Thrasher magazine's second skate punk release (subtitled "Thrasher's Skaterock Vol. II"). Released in 1984, it was the magazine's first skate rock release on both cassette and LP.

== Track listing ==
1. McRad – "Prevent This Tragedy"
2. T.S.O.L. – "Other Side"
3. Big Boys – "Lesson"
4. Anvil Chorus – "Blue Flames"
5. The Faction – "Friends and Enemies"
6. Kingpins – "Ready to Flip"
7. Los Olvidados – "Something New"
8. Borscht – "Bye-Bye"
9. Free Beer – "Pigs in Space"
10. JFA – "Beach Blanket Bongout"
11. JFA – "Johnny D"
12. T.S.O.L. – "In Time"
13. Free Beer – "Start the Ark"
14. Tales of Terror – "Gods from Outer Space"
15. Ancestors: Gods of Sound – "Treasures of Mankind"
16. Big Boys – "Assault"
17. McRad – "Tomorrow's Headlines"
18. Borscht – "Enemy"
19. Drunk Injuns – "She Gots a Gun"
