= Reckless driving =

Major moving traffic violation

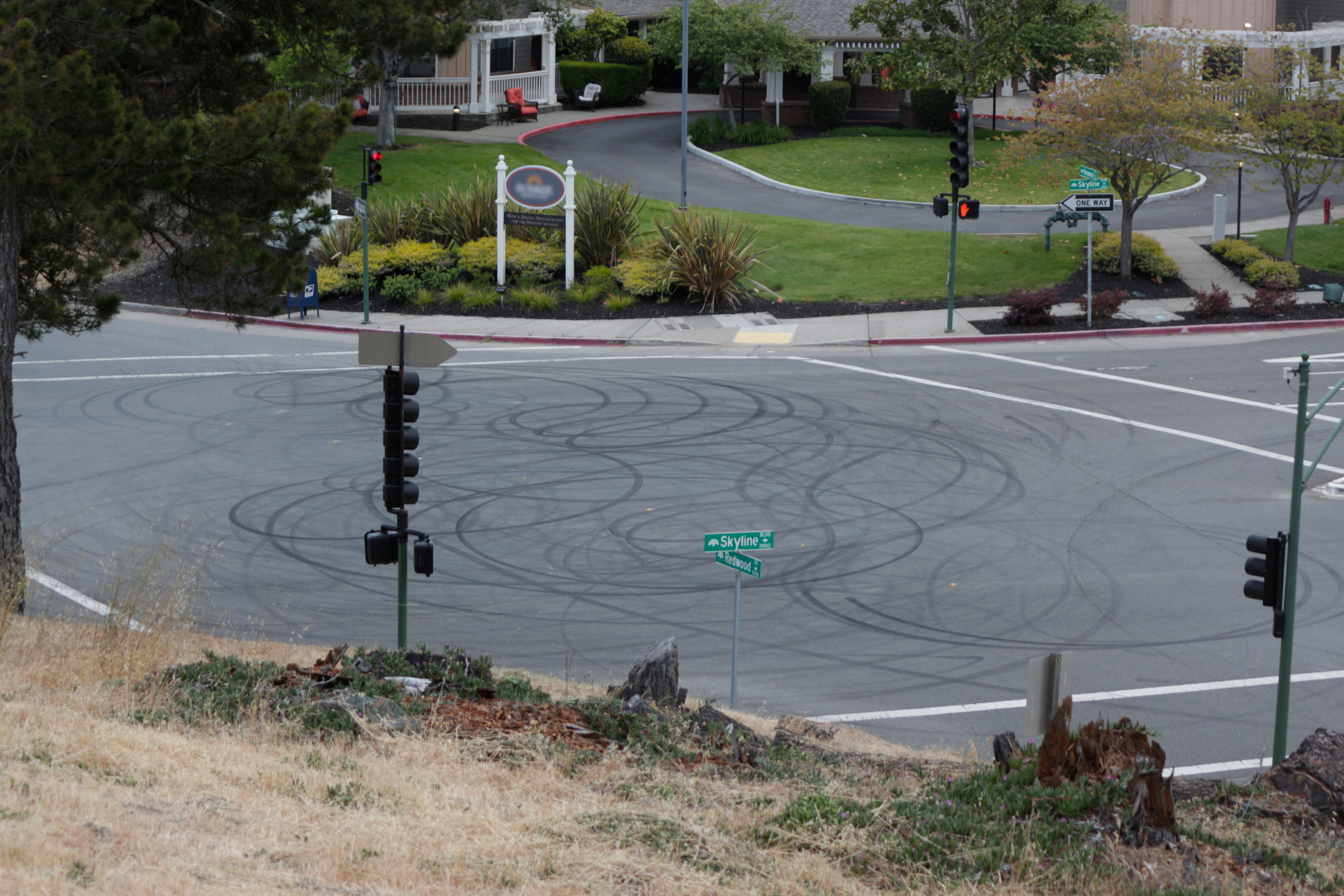
Skid marks from someone performing donuts at an intersection

Performing donuts, crossing solid lines, driving on the opposite side and crossing red lights

In United States law, reckless driving is a major moving violation related to aggressive driving that generally consists of driving a vehicle with willful or wanton disregard for the safety of persons or property. It is usually a more serious offense than careless driving, improper driving, or driving without due care and attention, and is often punishable by fines, imprisonment, or the suspension or revocation of one's driver's license. In Commonwealth countries, the offense of dangerous driving applies.

Reckless driving has been studied by psychologists who found that reckless drivers score high in risk-taking personality traits; however, no one cause can be assigned to the mental state.

Depending on the jurisdiction, reckless driving may be defined by a particular subjective mental state that is evident from the circumstances, or by particular driver actions regardless of mental state, or both.

== State laws ==
=== Alabama ===
Code of Alabama 1975, Title 32 (Motor Vehicles and Traffic), Section 32-5A-190 (Reckless driving):

(a) Any person who drives any vehicle carelessly and heedlessly in willful or wanton disregard for the rights or safety of persons or property, or without due caution and circumspection and at a speed or in a manner so as to endanger or be likely to endanger any person or property, shall be guilty of reckless driving.
(b) Every person convicted of reckless driving shall be punished upon a first conviction by imprisonment for a period of not less than five days nor more than 90 days, or by fine of not less than $25.00 nor more than $500.00, or by both such fine and imprisonment, and on a second or subsequent conviction shall be punished by imprisonment for not less than 10 days nor more than six months, or by a fine of not less than $50.00 nor more than $500.00, or by both such fine and imprisonment, and the court may prohibit the person so convicted from driving a motor vehicle on the public highways of this state for a period not exceeding six months, and the license of the person shall be suspended for such period by the Director of Public Safety pursuant to Section 32-5A-195.
(c) Neither reckless driving nor any other moving violation under this chapter is a lesser included offense under a charge of driving while under the influence of alcohol or drugs. (Acts 1980, No. 80-434, p. 604, §9-101.)

=== Alaska ===
Alaska Statutes, Title 28 (Motor Vehicles), Chapter 35 (Offenses and Accidents), Section 40. (Reckless Driving)

(a) A person who drives a motor vehicle in the state in a manner that creates a substantial and unjustifiable risk of harm to a person or to property is guilty of reckless driving. A substantial and unjustifiable risk is a risk of such a nature and degree that the conscious disregard of it or a failure to perceive it constitutes a gross deviation from the standard of conduct that a reasonable person would observe in the situation.
(b) A person convicted of reckless driving is guilty of a misdemeanor and is punishable by a fine of not more than $1,000 or by imprisonment for not more than one year or by both.
(c) Lawfully conducted automobile, snowmobile, motorcycle, or other motor vehicle racing or exhibition events are not subject to the provisions of this section. (AS 28.35.040)

=== Arizona ===
28-693. Reckless driving; classification; license; surrender

A. A person who drives a vehicle in reckless disregard for the safety of persons or property is guilty of reckless driving.
B. A person convicted of reckless driving is guilty of a class 2 misdemeanor.
C. In addition, the judge may require the surrender to a police officer of any driver license of the convicted person, shall report the conviction to the department and may order the driving privileges of the person to be suspended for a period of not more than ninety days. On receipt of the abstract of conviction and order, the department shall suspend the driving privilege of the person for the period of time ordered by the judge.
D. If a person who is convicted of a violation of this section has been previously convicted of a violation of this section, section 13-1102 or section 13-1103, subsection A, paragraph 1, in the driving of a vehicle, or section 28-708, 28-1381, 28-1382 or 28-1383 within a period of twenty-four months:

1. The person is guilty of a class 1 misdemeanor.
2. The person is not eligible for probation, pardon, suspension of sentence or release on any basis until the person has served not less than twenty days in jail.
3. The judge may require the surrender to a police officer of any driver license of the person and shall immediately forward the abstract of conviction to the department.
4. On receipt of the abstract of conviction, the department shall revoke the driving privilege of the person.

E. The dates of the commission of the offense are the determining factor in applying subsection D of this section. A second or subsequent violation for which a conviction occurs as provided in this section does not include a conviction for an offense arising out of the same series of acts.
F. On pronouncement of a jail sentence under this section, and after the court receives confirmation that the person is employed or is a student, the court may provide in the sentence that if the defendant is employed or is a student the defendant can continue employment or schooling for not more than twelve hours per day nor more than five days per week. The defendant shall spend the remaining days or parts of days in jail until the sentence is served and shall be allowed out of jail only long enough to complete the defendant's actual hours of employment or schooling.

=== Arkansas ===
Arkansas Code, Title 27 (Transportation), Subtitle 4 (Motor Vehicular Traffic), Chapter 50 (Penalties and Enforcement), Subchapter 3 (Offenses and Penalties Generally)

(a) Any person who drives any vehicle in such a manner as to indicate a wanton disregard for the safety of persons or property is guilty of reckless driving.
(b) (1)

(A) If physical injury to a person results, every person convicted of reckless driving shall be punished upon a first conviction by imprisonment for a period of not less than thirty (30) days nor more than ninety (90) days or by a fine of not less than one hundred dollars ($100) nor more than one thousand dollars ($1,000), or by both such fine and imprisonment.
(B) Otherwise, every person convicted of reckless driving shall be punished upon a first conviction by imprisonment for a period of not less than five (5) days nor more than ninety (90) days or a fine of not less than twenty-five dollars ($25.00) nor more than five hundred dollars ($500), or by both such fine and imprisonment.

(2)

(A) For a second or subsequent offense occurring within three (3) years of the first offense, every person convicted of reckless driving shall be punished by imprisonment for not less than thirty (30) days nor more than six (6) months or by a fine of not less than five hundred dollars ($500) nor more than one thousand dollars ($1,000), or by both such fine and imprisonment.
(B) However, if the second or subsequent offense involves physical injury to a person, the person convicted shall be punished by imprisonment for not less than sixty (60) days nor more than one (1) year or by a fine of not less than five hundred dollars ($500) nor more than one thousand dollars ($1,000), or by both such fine and imprisonment. (AC 27-50-30; Acts 1937, No. 300, § 50; Pope's Dig., § 6708; Acts 1955, No. 186, § 1; A.S.A. 1947, § 75-1003; Acts 1987, No. 258, § 1)

=== California ===
California Vehicle Code§ 23103.5: Wet Reckless or Reckless Driving Involving Alcohol (Priorable as a California DUI)

(a) Any person who drives any vehicle upon a highway in willful or wanton disregard for the safety of persons or property is guilty of reckless driving.
(b) Any person who drives any vehicle in any off-street parking facility, as defined in subdivision (c) of Section 12500, in willful or wanton disregard for the safety of persons or property is guilty of reckless driving.
(c) Persons convicted of the offense of reckless driving shall be punished by imprisonment in a county jail for not less than five days nor more than 90 days or by a fine of not less than one hundred forty-five dollars ($145) nor more than one thousand dollars ($1,000), or by both that fine and imprisonment, except as provided in Section 23104.

Amended Sec. 19, Ch. 739, Stats. 2001. Effective January 1, 2002.

Reckless Driving: Bodily Injury Vehicle Code 23104

(a) Except as provided in subdivision (b), whenever reckless driving of a vehicle proximately causes bodily injury to any person other than the driver, the person driving the vehicle shall, upon conviction thereof, be punished by imprisonment in the county jail for not less than 30 days nor more than six months or by a fine of not less than two hundred twenty dollars ($220) nor more than one thousand dollars ($1,000), or by both the fine and imprisonment.
(b) Any person convicted of reckless driving which proximately causes great bodily injury, as defined in Section 12022.7 of the Penal Code, to any person other than the driver, who previously has been convicted of a violation of Section 23103, 23104, 23109, 23152, or 23153, shall be punished by imprisonment in the state prison, by imprisonment in the county jail for not less than 30 days nor more than six months or by a fine of not less than two hundred twenty dollars ($220) nor more than one thousand dollars ($1,000) or by both the fine and imprisonment.

Amended Ch. 216, Stats. 1984. Effective January 1, 1985.

=== Colorado ===
Colorado Statute CRS 42-4-1401: Reckless Driving

(1) A person who drives a motor vehicle, bicycle, electrical assisted bicycle, or low-power scooter in such a manner as to indicate either a wanton or a willful disregard for the safety of persons or property is guilty of reckless driving. A person convicted of reckless driving of a bicycle or /electrical assisted bicycle shall not be subject to the provisions of section 42-2-127.
(2) Any person who violates any provision of this section commits a class 2 misdemeanor traffic offense. Upon a second or subsequent conviction, such person shall be punished by a fine of not less than fifty dollars nor more than one thousand dollars, or by imprisonment in the county jail for not less than ten days nor more than six months, or by both such fine and imprisonment.
(3) A Colorado CRS § 42-4-1401 Reckless Driving Charge is considered a Class 2 Traffic Misdemeanor Offense. A conviction may result in a fine of $150.00 to $300.00, a possible jail sentence of 10 to 90 days, an assessment of 8 points to your driver’s license, and an increase in automobile insurance coverage or rates.

=== Connecticut ===
Connecticut Statute GSC Section 14-222: Reckless Driving

(a) No person shall operate any motor vehicle upon any public highway of the state, or any road of any specially chartered municipal association or of any district organized under the provisions of chapter 105, a purpose of which is the construction and maintenance of roads and sidewalks, or in any parking area for ten cars or more or upon any private road on which a speed limit has been established in accordance with the provisions of section 14-218a or upon any school property recklessly, having regard to the width, traffic and use of such highway, road, school property or parking area, the intersection of streets and the weather conditions. The operation of a motor vehicle upon any such highway, road or parking area for ten cars or more at such a rate of speed as to endanger the life of any person other than the operator of such motor vehicle, or the operation, downgrade, upon any highway, of any motor vehicle with a commercial registration with the clutch or gears disengaged, or the operation knowingly of a motor vehicle with defective mechanism, shall constitute a violation of the provisions of this section. The operation of a motor vehicle upon any such highway, road or parking area for ten cars or more at a rate of speed greater than eighty-five miles per hour shall constitute a violation of the provisions of this section.
(b) Any person who violates any provision of this section shall be fined not less than one hundred dollars nor more than three hundred dollars or imprisoned not more than thirty days or be both fined and imprisoned for the first offense and for each subsequent offense shall be fined not more than six hundred dollars or imprisoned not more than one year or be both fined and imprisoned.

=== Delaware ===
Delaware Statute DE Code Title 21 Section 4175: Reckless Driving

(a) No person shall drive any vehicle in wilful or wanton disregard for the safety of persons or property, and this offense shall be known as reckless driving.

(b) Whoever violates subsection (a) of this section shall for the first offense be fined not less than $100 nor more than $300, or be imprisoned not less than 10 nor more than 30 days, or both. For each subsequent like offense occurring within 3 years of a former offense, the person shall be fined not less than $300 nor more than $1,000, or be imprisoned not less than 30 nor more than 60 days, or both. No person who violates subsection (a) of this section shall receive a suspended sentence. However, for the first offense, the period of imprisonment may be suspended. Whoever is convicted of violating subsection (a) of this section and who has had the charge reduced from the violation of § 4177(a) of this title shall, in addition to the above, be ordered to complete a course of instruction or program of rehabilitation established under § 4177D of this title and to pay all fees in connection therewith. In such cases, the court disposing of the case shall note in the court's record that the offense was alcohol-related or drug-related and such notation shall be carried on the violator's motor vehicle record.

=== District of Columbia ===
District of Columbia DC Code Section 50-2201.04: Reckless Driving

(a) No vehicle shall be operated at a greater rate of speed than permitted by the regulations adopted under the authority of this part.
(b) A person shall be guilty of reckless driving if the person drives a vehicle upon a highway carelessly and heedlessly in willful or wanton disregard for the rights or safety of others, or without due caution and circumspection and at a speed or in a manner so as to endanger or be likely to endanger a person or property.
(b-1) A person shall be guilty of aggravated reckless driving if the person violates subsection (b) of this section and the person does one or more of the following:

(1) Operates the vehicle at a rate or speed at or greater than 30 miles per hour over the stated speed limit;
(2) Causes bodily harm or permanent disability or disfigurement to another; or
(3) Causes property damage in excess of $1,000.

(c)

(1) A person violating subsection (b) of this section shall, upon conviction for the first offense, be fined no more than the amount set forth in § 22‑3571.01, or incarcerated for no more than 90 days, or both.
(2) A person violating subsection (b) of this section when the person has been convicted of a prior offense under subsection (b) of this section within a 2-year period and is being sentenced on the current offense shall be fined no more than the amount set forth in § 22‑3571.01, or incarcerated for no more than 180 days.
(3) A person violating subsection (b) of this section when the person has 2 or more prior convictions for offenses under subsection (b) of this section within a 2-year period and is being sentenced on the current offense shall be fined no more than the amount set forth in § 22‑3571.01, or incarcerated for no more than one year.

(c-1)

(1) A person violating subsection (b-1) of this section shall, upon conviction for the first offense, be fined no more than the amount set forth in § 22‑3571.01, or incarcerated for no more than 180 days, or both.
(2) A person violating subsection (b-1) of this section when the person has one or more prior convictions for offenses under subsection (b-1) within a 2-year period and is being sentenced on the current offense shall be fined no more than the amount set forth in § 22‑3571.01, or incarcerated for no more than one year.

(d) Any individual violating any provision of this section, except where the offense constitutes aggravated reckless driving, shall be subject to a civil fine under the District of Columbia Traffic Adjudication Act (§ 50‑2301.01 et seq.).
(e) A presumption shall exist that a reckless, careless, hazardous, or aggressive driving conviction that occurred in a foreign jurisdiction constitutes reckless driving as provided in subsection (b) of this section, unless the District can show evidence that the person met the requirements for aggravated reckless driving in subsection (b-1) of this section.
(f) The fines set forth in this section shall not be limited by § 22‑3571.01.

=== Florida ===
Florida Statute Section 316.192: Reckless Driving

(1)(a) Any person who drives any vehicle in willful or wanton disregard for the safety of persons or property is guilty of reckless driving.
(b) Fleeing a law enforcement officer in a motor vehicle is reckless driving per se.
(2) Except as provided in subsection (3), any person convicted of reckless driving shall be punished:
(a) Upon a first conviction, by imprisonment for a period of not more than 90 days or by fine of not less than $25 nor more than $500, or by both such fine and imprisonment.
(b) On a second or subsequent conviction, by imprisonment for not more than 6 months or by a fine of not less than $50 nor more than $1,000, or by both such fine and imprisonment.
(3) Any person:
(a) Who is in violation of subsection (1);
(b) Who operates a vehicle; and
(c) Who, by reason of such operation, causes:
1. Damage to the property or person of another commits a misdemeanor of the first degree, punishable as provided in s. 775.082 or s. 775.083.
2. Serious bodily injury to another commits a felony of the third degree, punishable as provided in s. 775.082, s. 775.083, or s. 775.084. The term "serious bodily injury" means an injury to another person, which consists of a physical condition that creates a substantial risk of death, serious personal disfigurement, or protracted loss or impairment of the function of any bodily member or organ.
(4) Notwithstanding any other provision of this section, $5 shall be added to a fine imposed pursuant to this section. The clerk shall remit the $5 to the Department of Revenue for deposit in the Emergency Medical Services Trust Fund.
(5) In addition to any other penalty provided under this section, if the court has reasonable cause to believe that the use of alcohol, chemical substances set forth in s. 877.111, or substances controlled under chapter 893 contributed to a violation of this section, the court shall direct the person so convicted to complete a DUI program substance abuse

=== Georgia ===
O.C.G.A. § 40-6-390. Reckless Driving

(a) Any person who drives any vehicle in reckless disregard for the safety of persons or property commits the offense of reckless driving.

(b) Every person convicted of reckless driving shall be guilty of a misdemeanor and, upon conviction thereof, shall be punished by a fine not to exceed $1,000.00 or imprisonment not to exceed 12 months, or by both such fine and imprisonment, provided that no provision of this Code section shall be construed so as to deprive the court imposing the sentence of the power given by law to stay or suspend the execution of such sentence or to place the defendant on probation.

=== Hawaii ===
Hawaii Statute HRS Section 291-2: Reckless Driving

Whoever operates any vehicle or rides any animal recklessly in disregard of the safety of persons or property is guilty of reckless driving of vehicle or reckless riding of an animal, as appropriate, and shall be fined not more than $1,000 or imprisoned not more than thirty days, or both

=== Idaho ===
Idaho Statute Section 49-1401: Reckless Driving

(1) Any person who drives or is in actual physical control of any vehicle upon a highway, or upon public or private property open to public use, carelessly and heedlessly or without due caution and circumspection, and at a speed or in a manner as to endanger or be likely to endanger any person or property, or who passes when there is a line in his lane indicating a sight distance restriction, shall be guilty of reckless driving and upon conviction shall be punished as provided in subsection (2) of this section.
(2) Every person who pleads guilty to or is found guilty of reckless driving for the first time is guilty of a misdemeanor and may be sentenced to jail for not more than six (6) months or may be fined not more than one thousand dollars ($1,000), or may be punished by both fine and imprisonment. Every person who pleads guilty to or is found guilty of reckless driving, who has previously been found guilty of or has pled guilty to reckless driving, or any substantially conforming foreign criminal violation within five (5) years, notwithstanding the form of the judgment(s) or withheld judgment(s), is guilty of a misdemeanor and may be sentenced to jail for not more than one (1) year or may be fined not more than two thousand dollars ($2,000), or may be punished by both fine and imprisonment. The department shall suspend the driver's license or privileges of any such person as provided in section 49-326, Idaho Code.
(3) Inattentive driving shall be considered a lesser offense than reckless driving and shall be applicable in those circumstances where the conduct of the operator has been inattentive, careless or imprudent, in light of the circumstances then existing, rather than heedless or wanton, or in those cases where the danger to persons or property by the motor vehicle operator's conduct is slight. Every person convicted of inattentive driving under this section shall be guilty of a misdemeanor and may be sentenced to jail for not more than ninety (90) days or may be fined not more than three hundred dollars ($300), or may be punished by both fine and imprisonment.

=== Illinois ===
Illinois Statute 625 ILCS 5/11-503: Reckless Driving

(a) A person commits reckless driving if he or she:

(1) drives any vehicle with a willful or wanton disregard for the safety of persons or property; or
(2) knowingly drives a vehicle and uses an incline in a roadway, such as a railroad crossing, bridge approach, or hill, to cause the vehicle to become airborne.

(b) Every person convicted of reckless driving shall be guilty of a Class A misdemeanor, except as provided under subsections (b-1), (c), and (d) of this Section.
(b-1) Except as provided in subsection (d), any person convicted of violating subsection (a), if the violation causes bodily harm to a child or a school crossing guard while the school crossing guard is performing his or her official duties, is guilty of a Class 4 felony.
(c) Every person convicted of committing a violation of subsection (a) shall be guilty of aggravated reckless driving if the violation results in great bodily harm or permanent disability or disfigurement to another. Except as provided in subsection (d) of this Section, aggravated reckless driving is a Class 4 felony.
(d) Any person convicted of violating subsection (a), if the violation causes great bodily harm or permanent disability or disfigurement to a child or a school crossing guard while the school crossing guard is performing his or her official duties, is guilty of aggravated reckless driving. Aggravated reckless driving under this subsection (d) is a Class 3 felony.

=== Indiana ===
Indiana Statute 9-21-8-52: Reckless Driving

(a) A person who operates a vehicle and who recklessly:

(1) drives at such an unreasonably high rate of speed or at such an unreasonably low rate of speed under the circumstances as to:

(A) endanger the safety or the property of others; or
(B) block the proper flow of traffic;

(2) passes another vehicle from the rear while on a slope or on a curve where vision is obstructed for a distance of less than five hundred (500) feet ahead;
(3) drives in and out of a line of traffic, except as otherwise permitted; or
(4) speeds up or refuses to give one-half (1/2) of the roadway to a driver overtaking and desiring to pass;

commits a Class B misdemeanor.

(b) A person who operates a vehicle and who recklessly passes a school bus stopped on a roadway when the arm signal device specified in IC 9-21-12-13 is in the device's extended position commits a Class B misdemeanor. However, the offense is a Class A misdemeanor if it causes bodily injury to a person.
(c) If an offense under subsection (a) or (b) results in damage to the property of another person or bodily injury to another person, the court shall recommend the suspension of the current driving license of the person for a fixed period of:

(1) not less than thirty (30) days; and
(2) not more than one (1) year.

=== Iowa ===
Iowa Statute Section 321.277: Reckless Driving

Any person who drives any vehicle in such manner as to indicate either a willful or a wanton disregard for the safety of persons or property is guilty of reckless driving. Every person convicted of reckless driving shall be guilty of a simple misdemeanor.

=== Kansas ===
Kansas Statute Section 8-1566: Reckless Driving

(a) Any person who drives any vehicle in willful or wanton disregard for the safety of persons or property is guilty of reckless driving.
(b) Except as provided in K.S.A. 8-2,142, violation of this section is a misdemeanor. Upon a first conviction of a violation of this section, a person shall be sentenced to not less than five days nor more than 90 days imprisonment or fined not less than $25 nor more than $500, or both such fine and imprisonment. On a second or subsequent conviction of a violation of this section, a person shall be sentenced to not less than 10 days nor more than six months imprisonment, or fined not less than $50 nor more than $500 or both such fine and imprisonment.

=== Kentucky ===
Kentucky Statute KRS 189.290

=== Louisiana ===
Louisiana Statute RS 32:58: Careless Operation

A. Any person operating a motor vehicle on the public roads of this state shall drive in a careful and prudent manner, so as not to endanger the life, limb, or property of any person. Failure to drive in such a manner shall constitute careless operation.

B. If the careless operation of the motor vehicle directly or proximately causes the death of a human being, when the operator fails to maintain control of the vehicle because of falling asleep, in addition to any penalties provided in this Title, the person shall also be ordered to serve court-approved community service for not more than two hundred fifty hours and the department may suspend the operator's license for a period of two years

=== Maine ===
Maine Statute MRS Title 29-A Section 2413: Driving to Endanger

1. Definition. A person commits a Class E crime if, with criminal negligence as defined in Title 17-A, that person drives a motor vehicle in any place in a manner that endangers the property of another or a person, including the operator or passenger in the motor vehicle being driven.
1-A. Aggravated punishment category. Notwithstanding subsection 1, a person commits a Class C crime if, with criminal negligence as defined in Title 17-A, section 35, that person drives a motor vehicle in any place in a manner that endangers the property of another or a person, including the operator or passenger in the motor vehicle being driven, and causes serious bodily injury, as defined in Title 17-A, section 2, subsection 23, to another person.
2. Allegation of facts. In pleading under this section, it is not necessary to allege specifically the facts that constitute criminal negligence.
3. Penalties. In addition to any other penalty, the court shall suspend the driver's license of a person convicted under subsection 1 for not less than 30 days nor more than 180 days, which minimum may not be suspended. In addition to any other penalty, the court shall suspend the driver's license of a person convicted under subsection 1-A for not less than 180 days nor more than 2 years, which minimum may not be suspended. If the court fails to suspend the license, the Secretary of State shall impose the minimum period of suspension. The court shall impose a sentencing alternative that involves a fine of not less than $575, which may not be suspended.

=== Maryland ===
Maryland Statute MD Transp. Code Section 21-901.1: Reckless Driving

(a) A person is guilty of reckless driving if he drives a motor vehicle:

(1) In wanton or willful disregard for the safety of persons or property; or
(2) In a manner that indicates a wanton or willful disregard for the safety of persons or property.

(b) A person is guilty of negligent driving if he drives a motor vehicle in a careless or imprudent manner that endangers any property or the life or person of any individual.

=== Massachusetts ===
Massachusetts Statute Chapter 89 and 90 Section 24

=== Michigan ===
Michigan Statute 257.626 Reckless driving on highway, frozen public lake, or parking place

(1) A person who violates this section is guilty of reckless driving punishable as provided in this section.
(2) Except as otherwise provided in this section, a person who operates a vehicle upon a highway or a frozen public lake, stream, or pond or other place open to the general public, including, but not limited to, an area designated for the parking of motor vehicles, in willful or wanton disregard for the safety of persons or property is guilty of a misdemeanor punishable by imprisonment for not more than 93 days or a fine of not more than $500.00, or both.
(3) Beginning October 31, 2010, a person who operates a vehicle in violation of subsection (2) and by the operation of that vehicle causes serious impairment of a body function to another person is guilty of a felony punishable by imprisonment for not more than 5 years or a fine of not less than $1,000.00 or more than $5,000.00, or both. The judgment of sentence may impose the sanction permitted under section 625n. If the vehicle is not ordered forfeited under section 625n, the court shall order vehicle immobilization under section 904d in the judgment of sentence.
(4) Beginning October 31, 2010, a person who operates a vehicle in violation of subsection (2) and by the operation of that vehicle causes the death of another person is guilty of a felony punishable by imprisonment for not more than 15 years or a fine of not less than $2,500.00 or more than $10,000.00, or both. The judgment of sentence may impose the sanction permitted under section 625n. If the vehicle is not ordered forfeited under section 625n, the court shall order vehicle immobilization under section 904d in the judgment of sentence.
(5) In a prosecution under subsection (4), the jury shall not be instructed regarding the crime of moving violation causing death.

=== Minnesota ===
Minnesota Statute 169.13: Reckless or Careless Driving

Subdivision 1.Reckless driving.

(a) Any person who drives any vehicle in such a manner as to indicate either a willful or a wanton disregard for the safety of persons or property is guilty of reckless driving and such reckless driving is a misdemeanor.
(b) A person shall not race any vehicle upon any street or highway of this state. Any person who willfully compares or contests relative speeds by operating one or more vehicles is guilty of racing, which constitutes reckless driving, whether or not the speed contested or compared is in excess of the maximum speed prescribed by law.

Subdivision 2.Careless driving.

Any person who operates or halts any vehicle upon any street or highway carelessly or heedlessly in disregard of the rights of others, or in a manner that endangers or is likely to endanger any property or any person, including the driver or passengers of the vehicle, is guilty of a misdemeanor.

Subdivision 3.Application.

(a) The provisions of this section apply, but are not limited in application, to any person who drives any vehicle in the manner prohibited by this section:

(1) upon the ice of any lake, stream, or river, including but not limited to the ice of any boundary water; or
(2) in a parking lot ordinarily used by or available to the public though not as a matter of right, and a driveway connecting the parking lot with a street or highway.

(b) This section does not apply to:

(1) an authorized emergency vehicle, when responding to an emergency call or when in pursuit of an actual or suspected violator;
(2) the emergency operation of any vehicle when avoiding imminent danger; or
(3) any raceway, racing facility, or other public event sanctioned by the appropriate governmental authority.

=== Mississippi ===
Mississippi Statute 63-3-1201

Any person who drives any vehicle in such a manner as to indicate either a wilful or a wanton disregard for the safety of persons or property is guilty of reckless driving. Reckless driving shall be considered a greater offense than careless driving.
Every person convicted of reckless driving shall be punished upon a first conviction by a fine of not less than Five Dollars ($ 5.00) nor more than One Hundred Dollars ($ 100.00), and on a second or subsequent conviction he may be punished by imprisonment for not more than ten (10) days or by a fine of not exceeding Five Hundred Dollars ($ 500.00), or by both.

=== Missouri ===
Missouri Statute MRS 304.012

=== Montana ===
Montana Statute 61-8-301

(a) operates a vehicle in willful or wanton disregard for the safety of persons or property; or
(b) operates a vehicle in willful or wanton disregard for the safety of persons or property while passing, in either direction, a school bus that has stopped and is displaying the visual flashing red signal, as provided in 61-8-351 and 61-9-402. This subsection:

(1)(b) does not apply to situations described in 61-8-351(6).
(2) A municipality may enact and enforce 61-8-715 and subsection (1) of this section as an ordinance.
(3) A person who is convicted of the offense of reckless driving or of reckless endangerment of a highway worker is subject to the penalties provided in 61-8-715.
(4)

(a) A person commits the offense of reckless endangerment of a highway worker if the person purposely, knowingly, or negligently drives a motor vehicle in a highway construction zone in a manner that endangers persons or property or if the person purposely removes, ignores, or intentionally strikes an official traffic control device in a construction zone for reasons other than:

(i) avoidance of an obstacle;
(ii) an emergency; or
(iii) to protect the health and safety of an occupant of the vehicle or of another person.

(b) As used in this section:

(i) "construction zone" has the same meaning as is provided in 61-8-314; and
(ii) "highway worker" means an employee of the department of transportation, a local authority, a utility company, or a private contractor.

=== Nebraska ===
Nebraska Statute 60-6, 213

=== Nevada ===
Nevada Statute NRS 484B.653 Reckless driving

1. It is unlawful for a person to:

(a) Drive a vehicle in willful or wanton disregard of the safety of persons or property.
(b) Drive a vehicle in an unauthorized speed contest on a public highway.
(c) Organize an unauthorized speed contest on a public highway.

2. If, while violating the provisions of subsections 1 to 5, inclusive, of NRS 484B.270, NRS 484B.280, paragraph (a) or (c) of subsection 1 of NRS 484B.283, NRS 484B.350, subsection 1 or 2 of NRS 484B.363 or subsection 1 of NRS 484B.600, the driver of a motor vehicle is the proximate cause of a collision with a pedestrian or a person riding a bicycle, the violation constitutes reckless driving.
3. A person who violates paragraph (a) of subsection 1 is guilty of a misdemeanor and:

(a) For the first offense, shall be punished:

(1) By a fine of not less than $250 but not more than $1,000; or
(2) By both fine and imprisonment in the county jail for not more than 6 months.

(b) For the second offense, shall be punished:

(1) By a fine of not less than $1,000 but not more than $1,500; or
(2) By both fine and imprisonment in the county jail for not more than 6 months.

(c) For the third and each subsequent offense, shall be punished:

(1) By a fine of not less than $1,500 but not more than $2,000; or
(2) By both fine and imprisonment in the county jail for not more than 6 months.

4. A person who violates paragraph (b) or (c) of subsection 1 or commits a violation which constitutes reckless driving pursuant to subsection 2 is guilty of a misdemeanor and:

(a) For the first offense:

(1) Shall be punished by a fine of not less than $250 but not more than $1,000;
(2) Shall perform not less than 50 hours, but not more than 99 hours, of community service; and
(3) May be punished by imprisonment in the county jail for not more than 6 months.

(b) For the second offense:

(1) Shall be punished by a fine of not less than $1,000 but not more than $1,500;
(2) Shall perform not less than 100 hours, but not more than 199 hours, of community service; and
(3) May be punished by imprisonment in the county jail for not more than 6 months.

(c) For the third and each subsequent offense:

(1) Shall be punished by a fine of not less than $1,500 but not more than $2,000;
(2) Shall perform 200 hours of community service; and
(3) May be punished by imprisonment in the county jail for not more than 6 months.

5. In addition to any fine, community service and imprisonment imposed upon a person pursuant to subsection 4, the court:

(a) Shall issue an order suspending the driver's license of the person for a period of not less than 6 months but not more than 2 years and requiring the person to surrender all driver's licenses then held by the person;
(b) Within 5 days after issuing an order pursuant to paragraph (a), shall forward to the Department any licenses, together with a copy of the order;
(c) For the first offense, may issue an order impounding, for a period of 15 days, any vehicle that is registered to the person who violates paragraph (b) or (c) of subsection 1 if the vehicle is used in the commission of the offense; and
(d) For the second and each subsequent offense, shall issue an order impounding, for a period of 30 days, any vehicle that is registered to the person who violates paragraph (b) or (c) of subsection 1 if the vehicle is used in the commission of the offense.

6. Unless a greater penalty is provided pursuant to subsection 4 of NRS 484B.550, a person who does any act or neglects any duty imposed by law while driving or in actual physical control of any vehicle in willful or wanton disregard of the safety of persons or property, if the act or neglect of duty proximately causes the death of or substantial bodily harm to another person, is guilty of a category B felony and shall be punished by imprisonment in the state prison for a minimum term of not less than 1 year and a maximum term of not more than 6 years and by a fine of not less than $2,000 but not more than $5,000.
7. A person who violates any provision of this section may be subject to the additional penalty set forth in NRS 484B.130 unless the person is subject to the penalty provided pursuant to subsection 4 of NRS 484B.550.
8. As used in this section, "organize" means to plan, schedule or promote, or assist in the planning, scheduling or promotion of, an unauthorized speed contest on a public highway, regardless of whether a fee is charged for attending the unauthorized speed contest.

=== New Hampshire ===
New Hampshire Statute 265:79: Driving Recklessly

Whoever upon any way drives a vehicle recklessly, or causes a vehicle to be driven recklessly, as defined in RSA 626:2 , II(c), or so that the lives or safety of the public shall be endangered, or upon a bet, wager, or race, or who drives a vehicle for the purpose of making a record, and thereby violates any of the provisions of this title or any rules adopted by the director, shall be, notwithstanding the provisions of title LXII, guilty of a violation and fined not less than $500 for the first offense and $750 for the second offense nor more than $1,000 and his or her license shall be revoked for a period of 60 days for the first offense and from 60 days to one year for the second offense.

=== New Jersey ===
New Jersey Statute 39:4-96

39:4-96. A person who drives a vehicle heedlessly, in willful or wanton disregard of the rights or safety of others, in a manner so as to endanger, or be likely to endanger, a person or property, shall be guilty of reckless driving and be punished by imprisonment in the county or municipal jail for a period of not more than 60 days, or by a fine of not less than $50.00 or more than $200.00, or both.

On a second or subsequent conviction he shall be punished by imprisonment for not more than three months, or by a fine of not less than $100 or more than $500, or both.

=== New Mexico ===
New Mexico Statute NMS 66-8-113

A. Any person who drives any vehicle carelessly and heedlessly in willful or wanton disregard of the rights or safety of others and without due caution and circumspection and at a speed or in a manner so as to endanger or be likely to endanger any person or property is guilty of reckless driving.
B. Every person convicted of reckless driving shall be punished, notwithstanding the provisions of Section 31-18-13 NMSA 1978, upon a first conviction by imprisonment for not less than five days nor more than ninety days, or by a fine of not less than twenty-five dollars ($25.00) nor more than one hundred dollars ($100), or both and on a second or subsequent conviction by imprisonment for not less than ten days nor more than six months, or by a fine of not less than fifty dollars ($50.00) nor more than one thousand dollars ($1,000), or both.
C. Upon conviction of violation of this section, the director may suspend the license or permit to drive and any nonresident operating privilege for not to exceed ninety days.

=== New York ===
Reckless driving in New York is a criminal misdemeanor. Other than in the New York City Criminal Court, an adult defendant has a right to a jury trial for all misdemeanors, including reckless driving.

==== Fines and jail time ====
A New York reckless driving charge is an unclassified misdemeanor, punishable as follows:

OFFENSE	MAXIMUM FINE	MAXIMUM JAIL TIME	POINTS
1st	$300	30 days	5
2nd	$525	90 days	5
3rd	$1,125	180 days	5

==== Statute ====
§ 1212. Reckless driving. Reckless driving shall mean driving or using any motor vehicle, motorcycle or any other vehicle propelled by any power other than muscular power or any appliance or accessory thereof in a manner which unreasonably interferes with the free and proper use of the public highway, or unreasonably endangers users of the public highway. Reckless driving is prohibited. Every person violating this provision shall be guilty of a misdemeanor.

=== North Carolina ===
North Carolina Statute NCGS section 20-140: Reckless Driving

(a) Any person who drives any vehicle upon a highway or any public vehicular area carelessly and heedlessly in willful or wanton disregard of the rights or safety of others shall be guilty of reckless driving.
(b) Any person who drives any vehicle upon a highway or any public vehicular area without due caution and circumspection and at a speed or in a manner so as to endanger or be likely to endanger any person or property shall be guilty of reckless driving.
(c) Repealed by Session Laws 1983, c. 435, s. 23.
(d) Reckless driving as defined in subsections (a) and (b) is a Class 2 misdemeanor.
(e) Repealed by Session Laws 1983, c. 435, s. 23.
(f) A person is guilty of the Class 2 misdemeanor of reckless driving if the person drives a commercial motor vehicle carrying a load that is subject to the permit requirements of G.S. 20-119 upon a highway or any public vehicular area either:

(1) Carelessly and heedlessly in willful or wanton disregard of the rights or safety of others; or
(2) Without due caution and circumspection and at a speed or in a manner so as to endanger or be likely to endanger any person or property

=== North Dakota ===
North Dakota Statute ND Code Chapter 39-08-03

Any person is guilty of reckless driving if the person drives a vehicle:

1. Recklessly in disregard of the rights or safety of others; or
2. Without due caution and circumspection and at a speed or in a manner so as to endanger or be likely to endanger any person or the property of another. Except as otherwise herein provided, any person violating the provisions of this section is guilty of a class B misdemeanor. Any person who, by reason of reckless driving as herein defined, causes and inflicts injury upon the person of another, is guilty of aggravated reckless driving, and is guilty of a class A misdemeanor.

=== Ohio ===
Ohio Statute ORC section 4511.20: Operation in willful or wanton disregard of the safety of persons or property

(A) No person shall operate a vehicle, trackless trolley, or streetcar on any street or highway in willful or wanton disregard of the safety of persons or property.
(B) Except as otherwise provided in this division, whoever violates this section is guilty of a minor misdemeanor. If, within one year of the offense, the offender previously has been convicted of or pleaded guilty to one predicate motor vehicle or traffic offense, whoever violates this section is guilty of a misdemeanor of the fourth degree. If, within one year of the offense, the offender previously has been convicted of two or more predicate motor vehicle or traffic offenses, whoever violates this section is guilty of a misdemeanor of the third degree.

=== Oklahoma ===
Oklahoma Statute 47-11-901: Reckless Driving

A. It shall be deemed reckless driving for any person to drive a motor vehicle in a careless or wanton manner without regard for the safety of persons or property or in violation of the conditions outlined in Section 11-801 of this title.
B. Every person convicted of reckless driving shall be punished upon a first conviction by imprisonment for a period of not less than five (5) days nor more than ninety (90) days, or by a fine of not less than One Hundred Dollars ($100.00) nor more than Five Hundred Dollars ($500.00), or by both such fine and imprisonment; on a second or subsequent conviction, punishment shall be imprisonment for not less than ten (10) days nor more than six (6) months, or by a fine of not less than One Hundred Fifty Dollars ($150.00) nor more than One Thousand Dollars ($1,000.00), or by both such fine and imprisonment.

=== Oregon ===
Oregon Revised Statutes

ORS 811.140 Reckless driving • penalty (1) A person commits the offense of reckless driving if the person recklessly drives a vehicle upon a highway or other premises described in this section in a manner that endangers the safety of persons or property. (2) The use of the term recklessly in this section is as defined in ORS 161.085 (Definitions with respect to culpability). (3) The offense described in this section, reckless driving, is a Class A misdemeanor and is applicable upon any premises open to the public. [1983 c.338 §571]

Amended July 1, 2007

=== Pennsylvania ===
Pennsylvania Statute Title 75 Chapter 37 Section 36: Reckless Driving

(a) General rule.--Any person who drives any vehicle in willful or wanton disregard for the safety of persons or property is guilty of reckless driving.
(b) Penalty.--Any person who violates this section commits a summary offense and shall, upon conviction, be sentenced to pay a fine of $200.

=== Rhode Island ===
Rhode Island Statute Section 31-27-4: Reckless Driving

(a) Any person who operates a motor vehicle recklessly so that the lives or safety of the public might be endangered, or participates in drag racing, or operates a vehicle in an attempt to elude or flee from a traffic officer or police vehicle, shall be guilty of a misdemeanor for the first conviction and a felony for the second and each subsequent conviction.
(b) For the purpose of this title, "drag racing" means the act of two (2) or more individuals competing or racing in a situation in which one of the motor vehicles is beside or to the rear of a motor vehicle operated by a competing driver and one driver attempts to prevent the competing driver from passing or overtaking him or her, or one or more individuals competing in a race against time unless the race is authorized by the owner of the property upon which the race takes place.

=== South Carolina ===
South Carolina Statute Section 56-5-2920

Any person who drives any vehicle in such a manner as to indicate either a wilful or wanton disregard for the safety of persons or property is guilty of reckless driving. The Department of Motor Vehicles, upon receiving satisfactory evidence of the conviction, of the entry of a plea of guilty or the forfeiture of bail of any person charged with a second and subsequent offense for the violation of this section shall forthwith suspend the driver's license of any such person for a period of three months. Only those offenses which occurred within a period of five years including and immediately preceding the date of the last offense shall constitute prior offenses within the meaning of this section. Any person violating the provisions of this section shall, upon conviction, entry of a plea of guilty or forfeiture of bail, be punished by a fine of not less than twenty-five dollars nor more than two hundred dollars or by imprisonment for not more than thirty days.

=== South Dakota ===
South Dakota Statute 32-24-1: Reckless Driving

Misdemeanor. Any person who drives any vehicle upon a highway, alley, public park, recreational area, or upon the property of a public or private school, college, or university carelessly and heedlessly in disregard of the rights or safety of others, or without due caution and circumspection and at a speed or in a manner so as to endanger or be likely to endanger any person or property, is guilty of reckless driving. Reckless driving is a Class 1 misdemeanor.

=== Tennessee ===
Tennessee Code §55-10-205: Reckless driving

(a) Any person who drives a vehicle with willful or wanton disregard for the safety of persons or property commits reckless driving.
(b) A person commits an offense of reckless driving who drives a motorcycle with the front tire raised off the ground in willful and wanton disregard for the safety of persons or property on any public street, highway, alley, parking lot, or driveway, or on the premises of any shopping center, trailer park, apartment house complex, or any other premises which are generally frequented by the public at large. Provided, the offense of reckless driving for driving a motorcycle with the front tire raised off the ground shall not be applicable to persons riding in a parade, at a speed not to exceed thirty (30) miles per hour, if the person is eighteen (18) years of age or older.
(c) A violation of this section is a Class B misdemeanor.

=== Texas ===
Texas Statute Sec. 545.401: Reckless Driving

(a) A person commits an offense if the person drives a vehicle in wilful or wanton disregard for the safety of persons or property.
(b) An offense under this section is a misdemeanor punishable by:

(1) a fine not to exceed $200;
(2) confinement in county jail for not more than 30 days; or
(3) both the fine and the confinement.

(c) Notwithstanding Section 542.001, this section applies to:

(1) a private access way or parking area provided for a client or patron by a business, other than a private residential property or the property of a garage or parking lot for which a charge is made for the storing or parking of motor vehicles; and
(2) a highway or other public place.

(d) Notwithstanding Section 542.004, this section applies to a person, a team, or motor vehicles and other equipment engaged in work on a highway surface.

=== Utah ===
Utah Statute UT Code 41-6a-528

(1) A person is guilty of reckless driving who operates a vehicle:

(a) in willful or wanton disregard for the safety of persons or property; or
(b) while committing three or more moving traffic violations under Title 41, Chapter 6a, Traffic Code, in a series of acts occurring within a single continuous period of driving covering three miles or less in total distance.

(2) A person who violates Subsection (1) is guilty of a class B misdemeanor.

=== Vermont ===
Vermont Statute 23 VSA Section 1091: Negligent operation; grossly negligent operation

(a) Negligent operation.

(1) A person who operates a motor vehicle on a public highway in a negligent manner shall be guilty of negligent operation.
(2) The standard for a conviction for negligent operation in violation of this subsection shall be ordinary negligence, examining whether the person breached a duty to exercise ordinary care.
(3) A person who violates this subsection shall be imprisoned not more than one year or fined not more than $1,000.00, or both. If the person has been previously convicted of a violation of this subsection, the person shall be imprisoned not more than two years or fined not more than $3,000.00, or both.

(b) Grossly negligent operation.

(1) A person who operates a motor vehicle on a public highway in a grossly negligent manner shall be guilty of grossly negligent operation.
(2) The standard for a conviction for grossly negligent operation in violation of this subsection shall be gross negligence, examining whether the person engaged in conduct which involved a gross deviation from the care that a reasonable person would have exercised in that situation.
(3) A person who violates this subsection shall be imprisoned not more than two years or fined not more than $5,000.00, or both. If the person has previously been convicted of a violation of this section, the person shall be imprisoned not more than four years or fined not more than $10,000.00, or both. If serious bodily injury as defined in 13 V.S.A. § 1021 or death of any person other than the operator results, the person shall be imprisoned for not more than 15 years or fined not more than $15,000.00, or both. If serious bodily injury or death results to more than one person other than the operator, the operator may be convicted of a separate violation of this subdivision for each decedent or person injured.

(c) The provisions of this section do not limit or restrict the prosecution for manslaughter.
(d) A person convicted of violating subsection (b) of this section shall be assessed a surcharge of $50.00, which shall be added to any fine or surcharge imposed by the court. The court shall collect and transfer the surcharge assessed under this subsection to be credited to the DUI Enforcement Fund. The collection procedures described in 13 V.S.A. § 5240 shall be utilized in the collection of this surcharge.

=== Virginia ===
The Code of Virginia has many articles pertaining to reckless driving, including specifying that certain traffic violations are automatically reckless driving. For example, Virginia code Virginia Code § 46.2-862 explicitly defines the act of speeding 20 mph or more above the posted speed limit, or at any speed greater than 85 mph, as reckless driving.

While Reckless Driving is considered a violation of the code of motor vehicles, it is punished as a Class 1 misdemeanor, which is a crime punishable by a fine up to $2,500 and/or up to one year in jail in Virginia. Reckless driving also results in DMV penalties, such as points and license suspension. The conviction is indexed in the Virginia General District Court Online Case Information System and is added to the Virginia Department of Motor Vehicles (DMV) record for 11 years, and six demerit points are applied.

A person charged with reckless driving, if they show that their actions, while they do show insufficient care or failure to properly operate a vehicle, but are not truly serious enough to reach the level of reckless driving, may instead be convicted by the court of the lesser included offense of improper driving which is considered a traffic infraction. This potential reduction in level of offense is only available at trial, as a law enforcement officer can only write a traffic ticket or summons for reckless driving, they do not have the ability to write a ticket for improper driving.

An analysis of 2025 Virginia court records covering 36,051 reckless driving cases found that 39.4% were amended to a lesser offense (most commonly improper driving under §46.2-869), 30.8% resulted in conviction on the original charge, and 20.2% were dismissed or dropped. Reduction rates varied substantially across jurisdictions, ranging from 5.6% to 65.3% among the 106 Virginia jurisdictions with at least 50 cases.

Commonly applied statutes for reckless driving

§ 46.2-852. Reckless driving; general rule. – Irrespective of the maximum speeds permitted by law, any person who drives a vehicle on any highway recklessly or at a speed or in a manner so as to endanger the life, limb, or property of any person shall be guilty of reckless driving.
§ 46.2-862. Exceeding speed limit. – A person is guilty of reckless driving who drives a motor vehicle on the highways in the Commonwealth (i) at a speed of 20 miles per hour or more in excess of the applicable maximum speed limit or (ii) in excess of 85 miles per hour regardless of the applicable maximum speed limit.
§ 46.2-868. Reckless driving; penalties. —

A. Every person convicted of reckless driving under the provisions of this article shall be guilty of a Class 1 misdemeanor.
B. Every person convicted of reckless driving under the provisions of this article who, when he committed the offense, (i) was driving without a valid operator's license due to a suspension or revocation for a moving violation and, (ii) as the sole and proximate result of his reckless driving, caused the death of another, is guilty of a Class 6 felony.

List of applicable statutes from the Code of Virginia

§ 46.2-852. Reckless driving; general rule.
§ 46.2-853. Driving vehicle which is not under control; faulty brakes.
§ 46.2-854. Passing on or at the crest of a grade or on a curve.
§ 46.2-855. Driving with driver's view obstructed or control impaired.
§ 46.2-856. Passing two vehicles abreast.
§ 46.2-857. Driving two abreast in a single lane.
§ 46.2-858. Passing at a railroad grade crossing.
§ 46.2-859. Passing a stopped school bus; prima facie evidence.
§ 46.2-860. Failing to give proper signals
§ 46.2-861. Driving too fast for highway and traffic conditions.
§ 46.2-862. Exceeding speed limit.
§ 46.2-863. Failure to yield right-of-way.
§ 46.2-864. Reckless driving on parking lots, etc.
§ 46.2-865. Racing; penalty.
§ 46.2-865.1. Injuring another or causing the death of another while engaging in a race; penalties.
§ 46.2-866. Racing; aiders or abettors.
§ 46.2-867. Racing; seizure of motor vehicle.
§ 46.2-868. Reckless driving; penalties.
§ 46.2-869. Improper driving; penalty.
§ 46.2-878.1. Maximum speed limits in highway work zones; penalty.
§ 46.2-829. Approach of law-enforcement or fire-fighting vehicles, rescue vehicles, or ambulances; violation as failure to yield right-of-way
§ 46.2-392. Suspension of license or issuance of a restricted license on conviction of reckless or aggressive driving; probationary conditions required; generally.
§ 46.2-393. Suspension of license on conviction of certain reckless offenses; restricted licenses.
§ 46.2-396. Suspension of license for reckless driving resulting in death of any person.

=== Washington ===
RCW 46.61.500 Reckless driving - Penalty

(1) Any person who drives any vehicle in willful or wanton disregard for the safety of persons or property is guilty of reckless driving. Violation of the provisions of this section is a gross misdemeanor punishable by imprisonment for up to three hundred sixty-four days and by a fine of not more than five thousand dollars.

(2) The license or permit to drive or any nonresident privilege of any person convicted of reckless driving shall be suspended by the department for not less than thirty days.

RCW 46.61.530 Racing of vehicles on highways - Reckless driving - Exception.

No person or persons may race any motor vehicle or motor vehicles upon any public highway of this state. Any person or persons who wilfully compare or contest relative speeds by operation of one or more motor vehicles shall be guilty of racing, which shall constitute reckless driving under RCW 46.61.500, whether or not such speed is in excess of the maximum speed prescribed by law: PROVIDED HOWEVER, That any comparison or contest of the accuracy with which motor vehicles may be operated in terms of relative speeds not in excess of the posted maximum speed does not constitute racing.

=== West Virginia ===
§17C-5-3. Reckless driving; penalties.

(a) Any person who drives any vehicle upon any street or highway, or upon any residential street, or in any parking area, or upon the ways of any institution of higher education, whether public or private, or upon the ways of any state institution, or upon the property of any county boards of education, or upon any property within the state park and public recreation system established by the Director of the Division of Natural Resources pursuant to section three, article four, chapter twenty of this code in willful or wanton disregard for the safety of persons or property is guilty of reckless driving.
(b) The provisions of subsection (a) of this section shall not apply to those areas which have been temporarily closed for racing sport events or which may be set aside by the Director of the Division of Natural Resources within the state park and recreation system for exclusive use by motorcycles or other recreational vehicles.
(c) Every person convicted of reckless driving is guilty of a misdemeanor, and upon a first conviction thereof, shall be confined in jail for a period of not less than five days nor more than ninety days, or fined not less than twenty-five dollars nor more than five hundred dollars, or both, and upon conviction of a second or subsequent conviction thereof, shall be confined in jail not less than ten days nor more than six months, or fined not less than fifty dollars nor more than one thousand dollars, or both.
(d) Notwithstanding the provisions of subsection (c) of this section, any person convicted of a violation of subsection (a) of this section who in doing so proximately causes another to suffer serious bodily injury shall, upon conviction, be confined in jail not less than ten days nor more than six months or fined not less than fifty dollars nor more than one thousand dollars, or both.
(e) For purposes of subsection (d) of this section, "serious bodily injury" means bodily injury which creates a substantial risk of death, which causes serious or prolonged disfigurement, prolonged impairment of health or prolonged loss or impairment of the function of any bodily organ.

=== Wisconsin ===
Wisconsin Statute WI Code Section 346.62: Reckless Driving

(1) In this section:

(a) "Bodily harm" has the meaning designated in s. 939.22 (4).
(b) "Great bodily harm" has the meaning designated in s. 939.22 (14).
(c) "Negligent" has the meaning designated in s. 939.25 (2).
(d) "Vehicle" has the meaning designated in s. 939.22 (44), except that for purposes of sub. (2m) "vehicle" has the meaning given in s. 340.01 (74).

(2) No person may endanger the safety of any person or property by the negligent operation of a vehicle.
(2m) No person may recklessly endanger the safety of any person by driving a vehicle on or across a railroad crossing in violation of s. 346.44 (1) or through, around or under any crossing gate or barrier at a railroad crossing in violation of s. 346.44 (2).
(3) No person may cause bodily harm to another by the negligent operation of a vehicle.
(4) No person may cause great bodily harm to another by the negligent operation of a vehicle.

=== Wyoming ===
Wyoming Statute WY Statutes Title 31 Chapter 5 Section 229: Reckless Driving

Any person who drives any vehicle in willful or wanton disregard for the safety of persons or property is guilty of reckless driving.

== Penalties by state ==
State	Pre-requisite	Mandatory Penalty	Maximum Penalty	Source
Texas	None specified	None specified	Up to a $200 fine; Up to 30 days in jail	http://www.statutes.legis.state.tx.us/Docs/TN/htm/TN.545.htm
Virginia	Greater than 85 mph OR more than 20 mph over posted speed limit	Class 1 misdemeanor	Up to a $2,500 fine; Up to 12 months in jail; Up to 6 months loss of driving privilege	

== See also ==
- Distracted driving
- Driving under the influence
- Drowsy driving
- Drug-impaired driving
- Drunk driving
- Mall takeover
- Preventable causes of death
- Recklessness (psychology)
- Road rage
- Street racing
- Traffic stop
- Traffic ticket
- Traffic violations reciprocity
