= Institute for Unpopular Culture =

Institute for Unpopular Culture (also known by the acronym, IFUC) is an alternative and outsider culture organization based in San Francisco, California.

== History ==
It was founded in 1989 by David Ferguson. IFUC's stated objective is to provide a range of services necessary for non-mainstream artists to fulfill their goals of artistic expression: public relations, counseling, business opportunities, and access to equipment. Ferguson said that IFUC provides artists with grants and other funding for their projects.

Ferguson called his approach to arts patronage "new philanthropy".

Much of the business that takes place at IFUC is volunteer-driven, or works given in trade.

Ferguson has said that IFUC arranged exhibitions of William Noguera's pen and ink photorealism—a sponsorship that raised eyebrows due to Noguera's status as a death row inmate at California's San Quentin State Prison. Ferguson claimed that IFUC had also been associated with performance artist Holly Hughes, one of the infamous NEA Four, a quartet of artists who saw their NEA funding cut off because of concerns of indecency. Other talents Ferguson claimed to have benefited from IFUC backing including graffiti artist Barry McGee (a.k.a. "Twist") and installation artist Joe Mangrum. Ferguson stated that The Institute helped launch the Punk Rock Orchestra, a San Francisco Bay Area music group which performs orchestral arrangements of punk rock classics.
