= Tales of Mystery and Imagination (disambiguation) =

Tales of Mystery and Imagination may refer to:

- Tales of Mystery & Imagination, a collection of works by American author Edgar Allan Poe
- Tales of Mystery and Imagination (TV series), a British TV series aired from 1966 to 1970
- Spirits of the Dead, a 1968 French/Italian film based on stories by Edgar Allan Poe, also known as Tales of Mystery and Imagination
- Tales of Mystery and Imagination, an unpublished 1970 anthology of works by Edgar Wallace, H. G. Wells, Ian Fleming, Arthur Conan Doyle and W. Somerset Maugham purportedly written by the authors after their death
- Tales of Mystery and Imagination (Alan Parsons Project album), the 1976 debut album by the progressive rock group "The Alan Parsons Project"
- Tales of Mystery and Imagination (Nocturnal Rites album), a 1997 album by Swedish power metal band Nocturnal Rites
