= Tales of Terror (Tales of Terror album) =

Studio album by Tales of Terror
- Released: September 1, 1984
- Recorded: April 1984
- Studio: Hyde Street Studios San Francisco, California. Engineered at Rhythmic River Studios, San Francisco, California. Mastered at Fantasy Studios, Berkeley, California.
- Genre: Hardcore punk, hard rock, garage rock, grunge
- Length: 29:13
- Language: English
- Label: CD Presents
- Producer: Paul Rat

Tales of Terror was the first and only full-length self-titled album released by Californian hardcore punk band Tales of Terror on September 1, 1984, on the label CD Presents.

== Background and recording ==
Seattle pioneer grunge band Green River admired them and recognised Tales of Terror as worthy predecessors by covering one of their songs as a tribute. Local college radio stations would often play their songs, for instance "Over Elvis Worship".

== Reception ==
Al Flipside reviewed Tales of Terror for Flipside in 1984. He wrote: "Mid-tempo driving grunge rock that gets pretty chaotic. I really liked their version of "Hound Dog" from the start, but it took me a while to be convinced. There's people that swear by these guys. I'm beginning to see..."

Tim Yohannan also reviewed Tales of Terror for Maximumrocknroll in 1984. He wrote: "Totally drunken, power-chord punk rock, folks. It's straight out of The Dead Boys/Stooges school of intense, fuck-it-all, snarl and self-destruct. These Sacramento's are good at it too. Recommended."

== Influence ==
The album is listed in Kurt Cobain's Journals at number 32 in a list of 50 and the song "Chambers of Horror" is in a list of songs.

Green River covered the Tales' song "Ozzy" renaming it as "Ozzie" on their 1987 EP Dry As a Bone. Alex Vincent, Green River's drummer, attended high school (Encina) with Magner, while he was in Sacramento, California band the Square Cools, for two years before moving to Seattle.

In 2008, Seattle band Mudhoney released The Lucky Ones. The ninth track on this album is titled "Tales of Terror" as another tribute. Mark Arm, the lead singer of Mudhoney, was also the lead singer for Green River.

The Melvins covered the song "Romance" for their 2013 covers album Everybody Loves Sausages. Guitarist/frontman Buzz Osbourne has talked about the track and the band in various interviews and stated that it's one of if not the best record to come out of California.

Crystal Fairy, a band featuring members of The Melvins, At The Drive In and Le Butcherettes, covered the song "Possession", renamed "Posesión", on their self-titled 2017 album.

== Track listing ==
All lyrics written by Pat Stratford, all music composed by Lyon Wong, Trip Bender, Geoff Magner, and Mike Hunter, except where noted.

Side one

No.	Title	Length
1.	"Hound Dog" (Jerry Leiber, Mike Stoller)	2:09
2.	"That Girl"	1:41
3.	"Possession"	2:25
4.	"Deathryder"	2:44
5.	"Evil"	2:30
6.	"13"	2:14

Cassette bonus track No. 1

No.	Title	Length
7.	"Skate or Bate"	4:25

Side two

No.	Title	Length
1.	"Romance"	2:47
2.	"Over Elvis Worship"	2:21
3.	"Tales of Terror"	2:14
4.	"Jim"	1:32
5.	"Chambers of Horror"	3:33
6.	"Ozzy"	3:05

Cassette bonus track No. 2

No.	Title	Length
7.	"Search and Destroy" (The Stooges)	3:10
Total length:		29:13

- For the cassette version one LP track ("Jim") is missing. (songbook was available separately.)

== Personnel ==
Adapted from Discogs.

=== Tales of Terror ===
- Geoff Magner – bass guitar, backing vocals (credited as "Dusty Coffin")
- Mike Hunter – drums [And Jokes] (credited as "Thopper Jaw")
- Steve Hunt – guitars, backing vocals (credited as "Capt. Trip Mender")
- Lyon Wong – guitars, backing vocals (credited as "Luther Storms")
- Pat Stratford – lead vocals [And Other Organs] (credited as "Rat's Ass")

=== Production ===
- Paul Rat – production
- Gary Mankin, Scott Chandler – engineering
- Gary Hobish – mastering engineer
- Erich Mueller – photography [cover]
- Victor Wong – photography [back cover]
