= Tales of Terror (band) =

American hardcore punk band

- Origin: Sacramento, California, U.S.
- Genres: Hardcore punk
- Years active: 1983–1986
- Label: CD Presents
- Past members: Pat Stratford; Lyon Wong; Steve Hunt; Geoff Magner; Mike Hunter

Tales of Terror was a Sacramento, California hardcore punk band which was active from 1983 until 1986. Some, including Kurt Cobain and Mark Arm, cite Tales of Terror as a key inspiration for the then-burgeoning grunge scene.

== History ==
After the dissolution of their previous band, the Square Cools, singer Pat "Rat’s Ass" Stratford (Note: His nickname was inspired by a rat drawing that hung on the wall of his father’s bar.) and bassist Geoff "Dusty Coffin" Magner formed Tales of Terror with guitarist Lyon Wong and drummer Mike Hunter. A second guitarist, Steve "Capt. Trip Mender" Hunt, later joined the band.

"Chambers of Horror"
Sample of "Chambers of Horror".

By 1984 they were playing all over town and supporting big name punk acts like The Vandals, Dead Kennedys, and Fang.

Their one album, the self-titled effort Tales of Terror, was released in 1984 on the San Francisco indie label, CD Presents. Distribution was limited; it is estimated that fewer than 5000 copies were pressed.

However, the band's career came to an end on the night of January 5, 1986. Wong, the son of Chinese-American actor Victor Wong, died on a Midtown sidewalk of head trauma he suffered after being knocked to the curb during a late-night altercation. He was pronounced dead at 2:14 am, January 6, at Sutter General Hospital. Wong was 22 years old. The assailant, a minor, received a 6-month sentence for manslaughter. The band opted not to continue without Lyon Wong. The various members drifted into other groups, most notably the Pirates of Venus, the Cactus Liquors and the Whorelords. The last time Pat Stratford, Steve "Capt. Trip Mender" Hunt, and Geoff Magner ever played on stage together was at the Trocadero in SF as an encore to a Hot Rod Shopping Cart show opening for Agent Orange with J Meraz on drums.

== Legacy ==
Described by Midtown Monthly as "One of the most influential bands Sacramento ever produced" and often cited as the foundation of the grunge movement, their blend of hardcore, psychedelia, and rock had a lasting impact on music fans around the country, including Green River and Nirvana frontman Kurt Cobain. In Exclaim! magazine Mudhoney’s Mark Arm (whose earlier band Green River covered Tales' "Ozzy" on their 1987 Dry As a Bone EP) listed some of their gigs as the most inspirational he had seen. Dave Chavez of Verbal Abuse said, "With the right management and maybe a little bit of rehab here and there, Tales of Terror probably would have been the Nirvana and broke. If it wasn’t for the murder of Lyon Wong."

== Members ==
- Pat Stratford - vocals (1982 - 1986)
- Lyon Wong - guitar (1982 - 1986; died 1986)
- Steve Hunt - guitar (1982 - 1986)
- Geoff Magner - bass (1982 - 1986)
- Mike Hunter - drums (1982 - 1986)

== Discography ==
=== Studio albums ===
Year	Album details
1984	Tales of Terror: Released: September 1, 1984; Label: CD Presents (015); Formats: Cassette (CS), LP

=== Compilation appearances ===
Year	Song	Title	Label
1984	"Gods from Outer Space" (instrumental)	Thrasher Skate Rock Vol. 2 - Blazing Wheels and Barking Trucks	High Speed Productions
1984	"Skate or Bate"	Rat Music For Rat People Vol. 2	CD Presents
1985	"Texas Against the World" "Danant" "LSD for Africa"	Them Boners Be Poppin'	Boner Records

== See also ==
- List of hardcore punk bands
