= Trilogy of Terror (disambiguation) =

Trilogy of Terror may refer to:

Films

- Trilogy of Terror (Trilogia do Terror), 1968 Brazilian horror film by José Mojica Marins
- Trilogy of Terror, 1975 American horror film
- Trilogy of Terror II, 1996 American horror film (sequel)

Other

- Trilogy of Terror (Blind Illusion album), the second demo album by thrash metal band Blind Illusion

== See also ==
- "Trilogy of Error", a 2001 episode of The Simpsons
- "Terrifying Tri-State Trilogy of Terror", a 2013 episode of Phineas and Ferb
