= Taking Over Me (disambiguation) =

"Taking Over Me" is a 2012 single by Lawson.

Taking Over Me may also refer to:

- "Taking Over Me", a 2003 song by Evanescence from Fallen
- "Taking Over Me", a 2009 song by Rootdown
- "Taking Over Me", a 2014 song by Yemi Alade from King of Queens
