= Clinton Fein =

American artist, writer, and activist (born 1964)

Clinton Fein (born 1964 in South Africa) is an artist, writer and activist, noted for his company Apollomedia and its controversial website Annoy.com, as well as its Supreme Court victory against Janet Reno, United States Attorney General, regarding the constitutionality of the Communications Decency Act in 1997.

This victory, a landmark for First Amendment rights, won Fein's right to disseminate his art. Fein won another federal First Amendment lawsuit to remove a government-imposed gag order. As recognition, Fein received a nomination for a PEN/Newman's Own First Amendment Award in 2001. Fein now presides the board of First Amendment Project, a nonprofit organization that protects and promotes freedom of information, expression, and petition.

== Early life and career ==
Born and raised in Johannesburg, South Africa, Fein graduated from the University of the Witwatersrand, Johannesburg, in 1986, with a Bachelor of Arts in Industrial Psychology. After living in New York for a couple of years, Fein moved to Los Angeles, where he began reporting directly to the President of Orion Pictures, as part of the creative team for numerous films, among them Academy Award-winning Dances with Wolves and The Silence of the Lambs.

From the outset, Fein's work has led him into some high-profile confrontations. In 1994, his CD-ROM Conduct Unbecoming: Gays and Lesbians in the US Military, based on the book by renowned investigative reporter Randy Shilts that examined the issue of gays in the military, used digital technology as an art form. When the US Navy unsuccessfully attempted to block its release, it became the first CD-ROM to triumph under First Amendment protections. Conduct Unbecoming won the Critic's Choice Award, was praised by Wired Magazine as "a tantalizing peek at the potential of CD-ROM publishing," and dubbed "evolutionary" by Rolling Stone Magazine.

== Art and law ==
Fein was the first South African-born American to challenge government restrictions on technological communications when he filed a federal lawsuit 30 January 1997. Fein, represented by Michael Traynor of Cooley Godward LLP and by William Bennett Turner of Rogers, Joseph, O'Donell and Phillips, filed a lawsuit against Janet Reno, former United States Attorney General, challenging the constitutionality of the Communications Decency Act (CDA).

The CDA made the communication of anything "indecent with the intent to annoy", a felony punishable by a fine and up to two-year imprisonment. President Bill Clinton signed the CDA into law in February 1996. Fein filed the lawsuit, Apollomedia v. Reno, the same time he launched his Annoy.com web site. A three-judge panel in United States District Court for the Northern District of California made a divided decision on the lawsuit. Fein filed a Supreme Court appeal, which he won in 1999.

In June 1999, the U.S. government sent Fein an order to reveal a user of Annoy.com's e-card service.

Earlier, in April 1999, the University of Houston tried unsuccessfully to obtain the website's records. The government later ordered Fein to stop discussing details of this investigation, its existence or its application. In United States v. ApolloMedia, Fein argued that this gag order violated the First Amendment and the statutory requirement that it have a definite duration.

The case moved from a Texas magistrate court to the United States District Court for the Southern District of Texas and then to the United States Court of Appeals for the Fifth Circuit. The Fifth Circuit granted the appeal. The District Court then unsealed the website's records and all related proceedings and lifted the gag order.

== Art, politics and censorship ==
As an artist, Fein is represented by Toomey Tourell in San Francisco and Axis Gallery in New York, and his shows have been dogged by controversy. In 2001, Fein was scheduled to open a solo exhibition, Annoy.com, (based on his critically acclaimed web site of the same name), in San Francisco in October. After the September 11, 2001 attacks, Artforum Magazine pulled an advertisement for Fein's show from their October issue. The advertisement displayed an image of a purse-lipped former New York mayor, Rudy Giuliani, sitting naked in a urine-filled glass, referencing the technique used by artist Damien Hirst, in which animate objects are soaked in formaldehyde and encased in a glass containers. Fein's advertisement, designed to link Mayor Giuliani with mayoral candidate Michael Bloomberg, incorporated imagery from the exhibition Sensation that resulted in mayor Giuliani withholding funding from the Brooklyn Museum. Clutching a crucifix with a nod to artist Andres Serrano and with another Giuliani targeted work, Chris Ofili's Virgin Mary forming the backdrop, copy on the top of the image reads: "Mike for Mayor" and at the bottom, "Start Spreading the News."

Artforum Executive Editor Knight Landesman stated that the magazine was understaffed and that the editors did not feel comfortable publishing a disparaging image of Rudy Giuliani.

In October 2004, Palo Alto-based printing company Zazzle destroyed two of Fein's giant images. just before the opening of a solo exhibition at Toomey Tourell Gallery. The first of the images, reviewed at Chelsea's Axis Gallery by The New York Times' Ken Johnson, was described as "an American flag with the stars and stripes made from the text of the official Abu Ghraib report ... accompanied by fifty representations of the iconic image of a hooded man teetering on a box with wires trailing from his arms comprising the stars." The other depicted President Bush on a crucifix and was entitled "Who Would Jesus Torture?" The printing company told San Francisco Chronicle art critic Kenneth Baker that it had "destroyed the images"; company spokesperson Matt Wilsey claimed the image might "offend Christians," and threatened to sue Fein for defamation if Fein publicly criticized the company's actions.

"Who Would Jesus Torture?" was published in Art of Engagement, Visual Politics in California and Beyond, by Peter Selz, released in November 2005, and exhibited at the Katzen Arts Center at American University in 2006. (Peter Selz is Professor Emeritus of the History of Art at the University of California, Berkeley, the founding director of the Berkeley Art Museum, and a former curator of New York's Museum of Modern Art.) In November 2006, "Who Would Jesus Torture" accompanied an article about Fein in American Protest Literature by author and Harvard University lecturer Zoe Trodd, published by Harvard University Press. It was this interview that Fein cited as a catalyst for his exhibition Torture, which opened at Toomey Tourell gallery in San Francisco in January 2007, featuring gigantic, high-resolution photographs that reenacted infamous scenes from Abu Ghraib prison in Iraq .

Fein's Torture series was exhibited in Beijing in September 2007 and in London in October 2007. A review in the December 2007 issue of Art in America magazine, summed up the impact of Fein's Torture series, stating: "Torture of detainees or their rendition to countries with even more abusive torture regimens has become semi-legal under the Bush administration. Fein reminds us, however, that these practices can never be anything less than intolerable."

Fein is the current editor of First Amendment Project's web log and writes a blog, Pointing Fingers for the San Francisco Chronicle.
