= Take Over (James Bond) =

Unpublished 1970 James Bond novel

Take Over is an unpublished 1970 James Bond novel purportedly written by Ian Fleming six years after his death. Spy author Donald McCormick believes this "remarkable story" is perhaps Ian Fleming's strangest legacy. In 1970 a retired bank officer and his daughter who have never been identified claimed to have transcribed works from the "great yonder" by deceased authors. None of the works has ever been published.

== Plot ==
Few details are known other than the plot involves "a poisonous gas which will enable its users to dominate the world." Peter Fleming conceded that this was "the sort of preposterous, cosmic story-line which might have occurred to Ian." Traditional James Bond elements such as M, Miss Moneypenny and Universal Exports also appear, though the story contains more sex than other Bond novels.

== History ==
Ian Fleming, author of the James Bond novels, died on 12 August 1964 of a heart attack. His brother Peter Fleming, himself also an author and occasional novelist, was a director of Glidrose Publications, the corporate entity Ian Fleming had established to administer the Bond copyright. Donald McCormick describes Peter Fleming as "level-headed" and "down-to-earth."

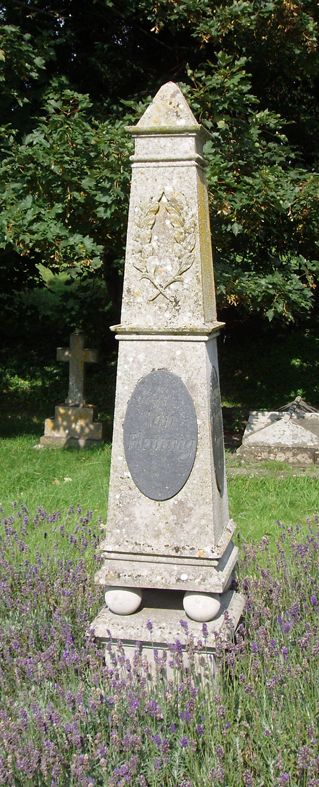
Ian Fleming's grave and memorial at Sevenhampton

In October 1970 a retired 73-year-old bank officer - only identified as "Mr. A." - wrote to Peter Fleming cryptically offering some "unusual" and "very pleasurable" news about Peter's late brother Ian. Mr. A. asked to meet Peter Fleming at the latter's Oxfordshire estate. Peter Fleming reluctantly agreed and so a meeting was set for the following Sunday.

Mr. A. traveled from Hertfordshire with his middle-aged daughter Vera. With them was a 60,000 word manuscript entitled Take Over: A James Bond Thriller.

Mr. A.'s wife - Vera's mother - had died in 1967. In December 1969, when Vera was recovering from an illness, she glanced at her mother's framed photograph on the piano and wished they could still talk. With pen in hand Vera found herself writing - with difficulty - on the writing pad in front of her, "I love you Vera."

Further extrasensory communication ensued. The automatic writing gradually became easier and the handwriting became that of her mother's. According to Vera and her father, Vera's handwriting "had always been rounded, loopy and backward-sloping." Vera had struggled to correct this having been repeatedly told at school that such penmanship was "a sign of bad character". But no matter how often school masters implored her, she could not remedy matters. But whilst transmitting messages from her mother, her own handwriting became sharp, pointed and italic, sloping "steeply forwards" like her mother's.

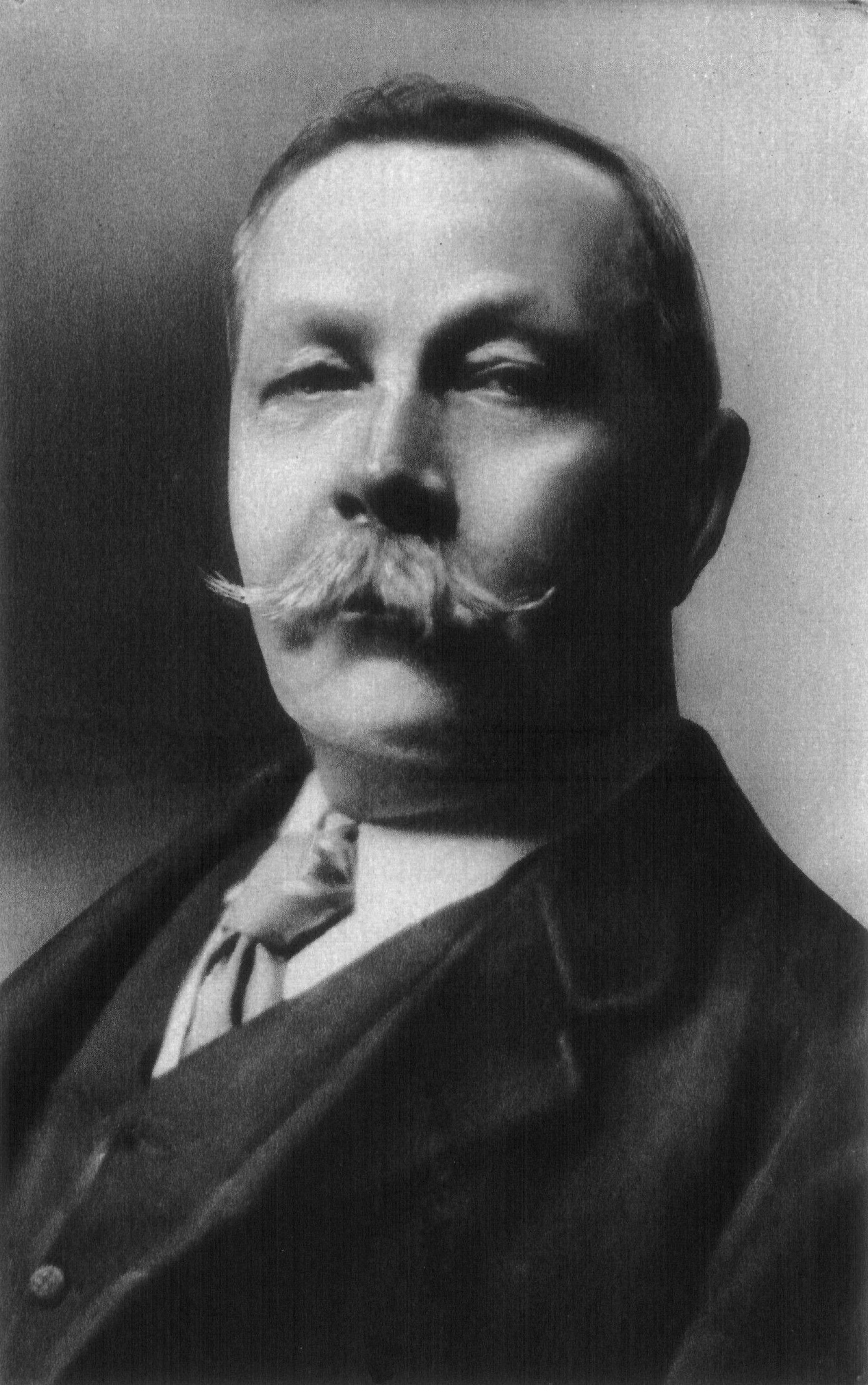
Sir Arthur Conan Doyle (1859-1930).

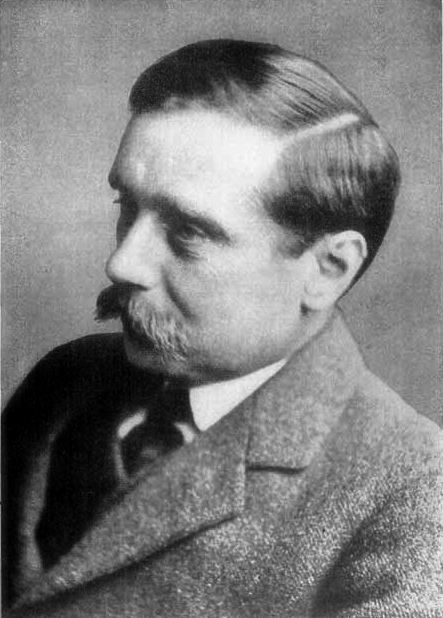
H. G. Wells (1866-1946).

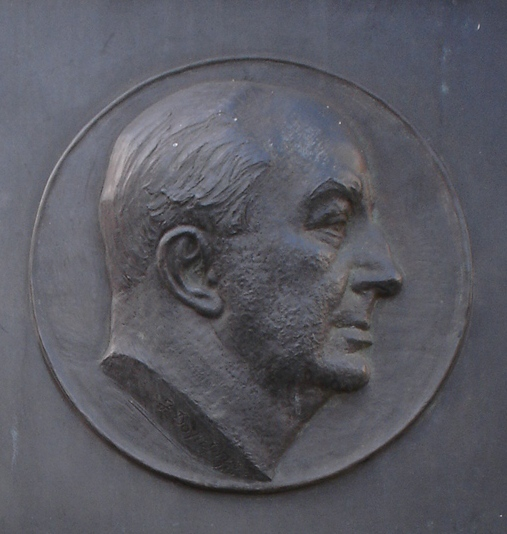
Edgar Wallace (1875–1932).

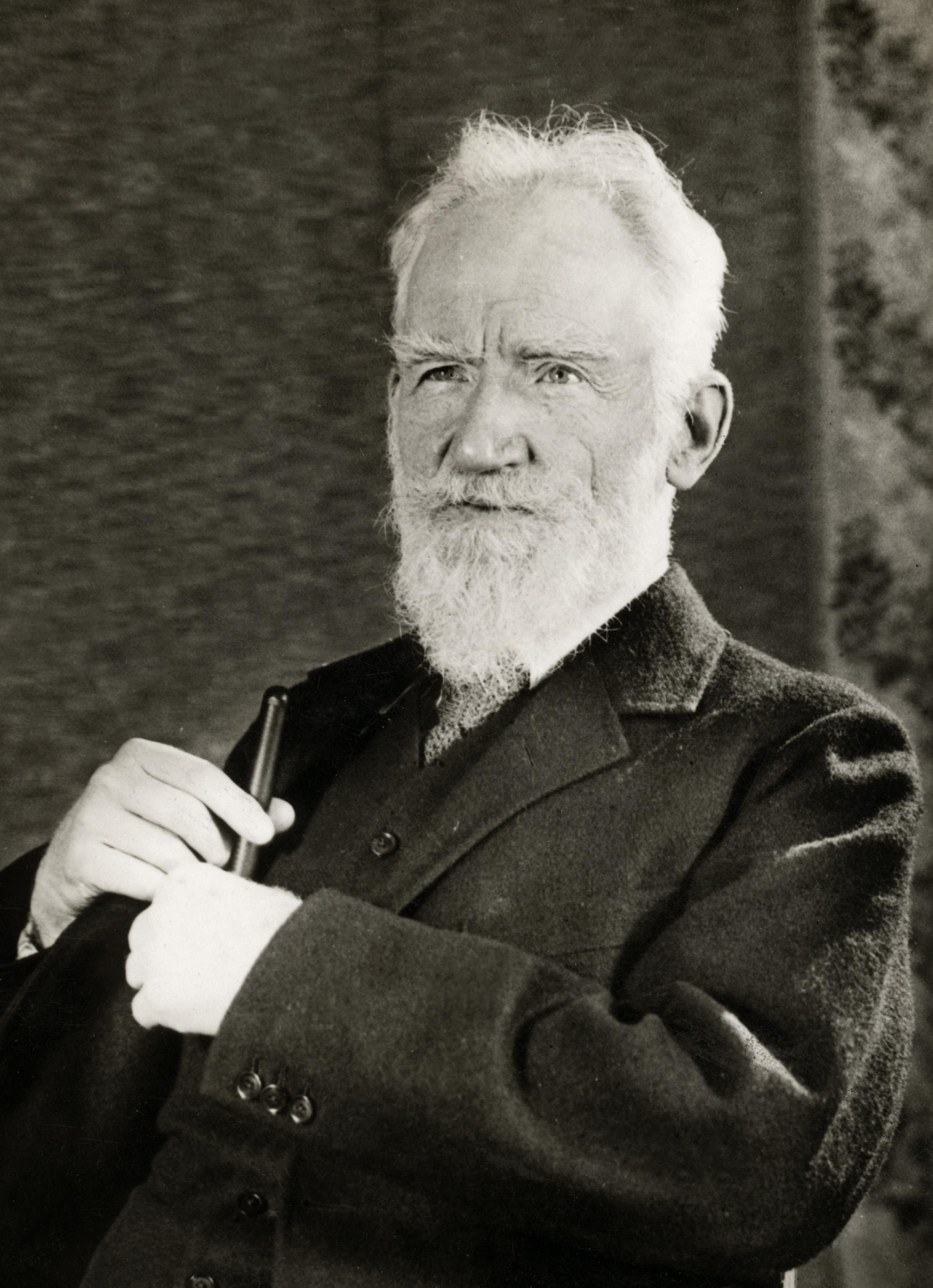
George Bernard Shaw (1856-1950).

At first the deceased Mrs. A. began describing life after death to her daughter. Eventually Mrs. A. began dictating new works of fiction by deceased authors who would not let death hamper their literary ambitions. Also in this spiritual consortium were Arthur Conan Doyle, H. G. Wells, Edgar Wallace, Ruby M. Ayres and W. Somerset Maugham. When Ayres "dropped out" George Bernard Shaw replaced her. Vera transcribed these communications in longhand.

Peter Fleming's biographer Duff Hart-Davis could not imagine anybody "harder-headed than Peter" in such matters, yet Peter Fleming readily agreed to read the manuscript.

Peter Fleming quickly grew sceptical having read only several pages. The prose and execution were nothing like Ian's. For example, the authors "described a room in a private house as a lounge," something Peter Fleming believed his brother Ian would never do no matter how "villainous the occupants." Mr. A. urged Peter Fleming to read what he considered to be one of the novel's "most exciting chapters." Peter Fleming told his guests that despite strenuous effort, he could not recognize his brother's prose. Vera, who sat with pad on knee, quickly wrote in her mother's handwriting that Ian "realizes the book is not his style but hopes to be able eventually to get this over correctly, although it may take time."

Peter Fleming had not intended to communicate with the spirit world, but needed to scrutinise his visitor's bona-fides. He asked Vera several questions about Ian: Ian's middle name, Ian's son Caspar's second name, Ian's house-colours at Eton, the name of the boy who broke Ian's nose at Eton, and the Russian for "yes". Vera correctly answered the first two questions. Anybody who'd read John Pearson's The Life of Ian Fleming could answer these and Mr. A. admitted that he'd eagerly read and re-read the Pearson work. But the three final questions stumped her and she gave uncertain, incorrect answers. The spirit - if it were indeed that - could not remember how many children Peter Fleming had, nor their names nor their gender.

Against his better judgment, Peter Fleming found the sight of Vera transcribing messages fascinating. Throughout the meeting she "sat quietly, her pen poised, waiting for a message" from the spirit world. "Her hand, after a period of stillness, would gradually start to twitch."

After this meeting - the first of three - ended. Sceptical as he was, Peter Fleming was intrigued. So excited was he by the visitation that he drove straightaway to animatedly tell a nearby neighbour immediately after Mr. A. and Vera had left.

Privately Peter Fleming thought the novel unusually incompetent, the story "implausible and silly," the style "a tasteless pastiche of the original", and the novel utterly and suspiciously devoid of sex. Yet the matter intrigued him. No matter how Peter Fleming looked at the matter, "a lot of energy was at work here." Vera allegedly had "no literary background" nor did she apparently show any "inclination" to write fiction. Further, she worked full-time, had a house to run and an ailing husband to care for. Peter Fleming believed that under normal circumstances it would have been remarkable enough for someone like herself and in her position to write over one hundred thousand words in eight months. Duff Hart-Davis, himself also a novelist, notes that "the sheer energy needed to put 100,000 words on paper is enormous," and could not discern where Vera's "momentum could have emanated."

Hart-Davis believes that Peter Fleming failed to consider the possibility that Mr. A. had unknowingly transmitted the communications "telepathically and subconsciously" to Vera. Certainly the "slushy" prose in Take Over and the other manuscripts were the sort a man like Mr. A. with his background would perpetrate. The manuscripts frequently used the adjective "pleasurable" as did Mr. A. in conversation; even Mr. A.'s initial letter to Peter Fleming promised "very pleasurable news concerning your late brother Ian." A communication purportedly from Maugham claimed that the deceased authors wished for those still alive to believe life continues after death and that "life goes on and very pleasurably I can assure you.".

Despite this, Hart-Davis admits that this theory suffers by not explaining how Vera could so readily write in her mother's hand.

According to the American Society of Questioned Document Examiners, persons wishing to disguise their handwriting often "changed their slant, or used backhand as a disguise element."

No matter, this incident "greatly enlivened" Peter Fleming's final winter - he died of a heart attack in August 1971 - and "in the spring of 1971" wrote an article which he submitted to The Sunday Times who accepted it offering £500 for the "first British serial rights" and made it the weekly main feature publishing it in their July 18, 1971 issue.

As for Take Over, Peter Fleming rejected the novel but permitted Mr. A. to submit the work to Jonathan Cape, the firm that had published Ian Fleming's James Bond novels. In November 1970 Mr. A submitted Take Over to Cape's who "not surprisingly rejected it."

== Tales of Mystery and Imagination ==
In November 1970, soon after meeting Peter Fleming, Vera began to transcribe a 30,000 word anthology entitled Tales of Mystery and Imagination. Within two months Edgar Wallace had written five stories, H. G. Wells and Ian Fleming two each, Arthur Conan Doyle and W. Somerset Maugham one each.

Peter Fleming read this manuscript and dismissed the stories as "tosh." According to author Duff Hart-Davis, the works were "crude, devoid of literary merit, and all almost exactly the same" despite purportedly being the work of different authors with distinct prose styles.

== W. Somerset Maugham ghost novel ==
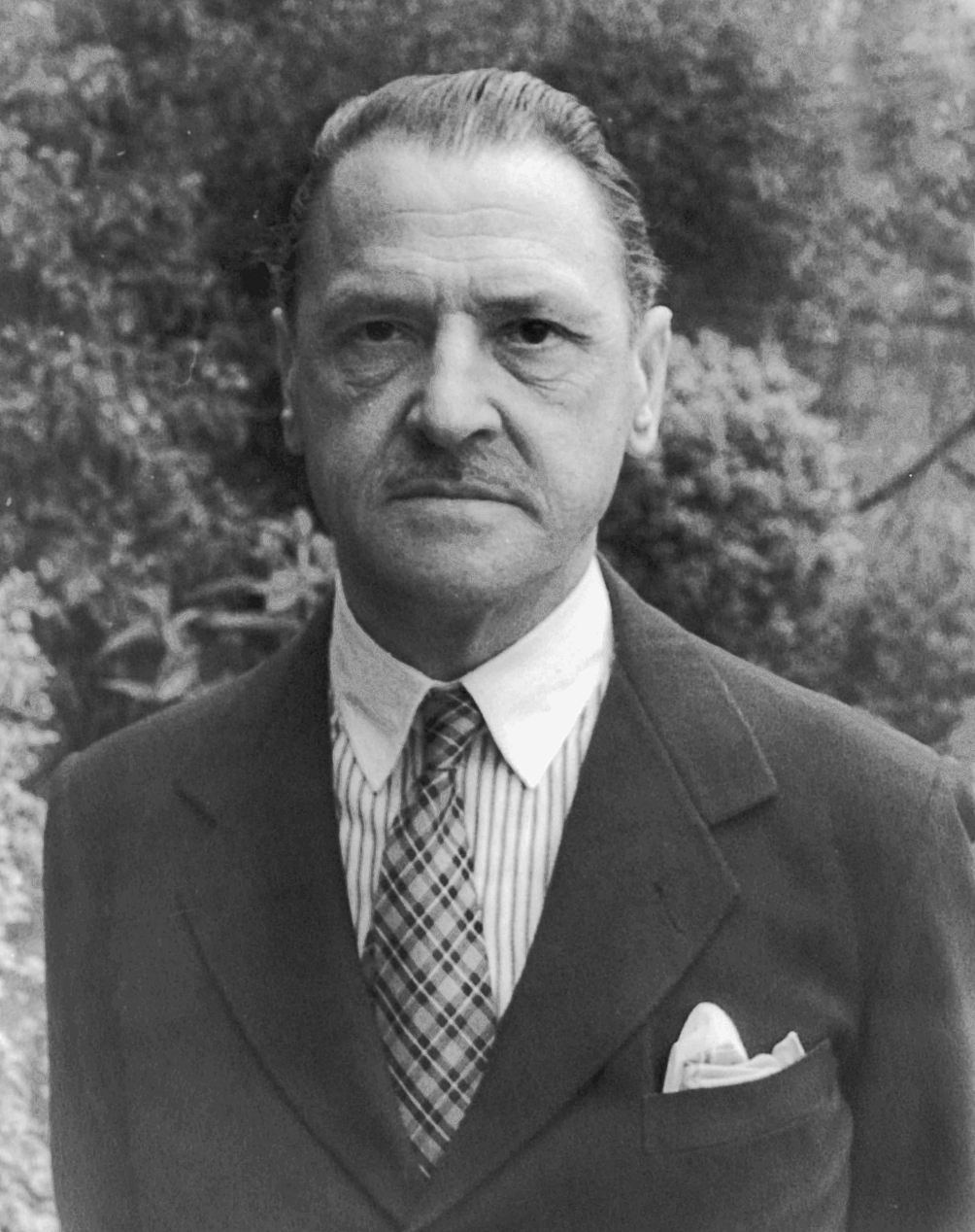
W. Somerset Maugham (1874-1965). Maugham photographed by Carl Van Vechten in 1934.

In early 1971, after finishing Tales of Mystery and Imagination, Vera began transcribing a full-length novel by Maugham.

Hope and fear continuously cantered in and out of my uncertain mind as I gazed from the opened latticed window upon the scurrying, fluttering, eddying autumn leaves caught and twirled hither and thither by the wind.

— an excerpt from a purported 1971 work by the spirit of the deceased W. Somerset Maugham,

This too, Peter Fleming read. Fleming remarked that "the highly regarded author's style has changed sharply since his death in 1965."

Having written several thousand words, Vera ceased transcribing the work when her husband - who had been ailing for some time - died in February 1971. Journalist Ron Speer believes the death of Vera's husband is "perhaps fortunate from a literary standpoint". Thereafter she exclusively devoted her automatic writing to corresponding with her deceased husband.

== Bibliography ==
- Druce, Robert (1988). This Day Our Daily Fictions: A Comparative Study of the Writings of Enid Blyton and Ian Fleming. Eburon. ISBN 9789051660302.
- Griswold, John (June 2006). Ian Fleming's James Bond: Annotations And Chronologies for Ian Fleming's Bond Stories. AuthorHouse. ISBN 978-1-4259-3100-1.
- Hart-Davis, Duff (1974). Peter Fleming: A Biography. London: Jonathan Cape. ISBN 0-224-01028-X.
- McCormick, Donald (1993). 17F: The Life of Ian Fleming. Peter Owen Publishers. ISBN 9780720608885.
- Ruthven, K.K. (1979). Critical Assumptions. CUP Archive. ISBN 9780521222570.
