= Teen takeover =

Unlawful gathering at malls

A mall takeover or teen takeover is an event in which people gather in a public area, such as a mall, market, or park, with the ad hoc organization of such takeovers taking place over social media. In June 2026, PBS reported, "'Teen takeovers' — where teens coordinate on social media to show up en masse at the same place and same time — have swept some U.S. cities in recent months. At times, these meetups have turned violent, putting officials on edge as schools across the nation let out for the summer."

In 2026, amid the proliferation of no-cost AI image generation, flyers have been quickly produced and distributed via social media.

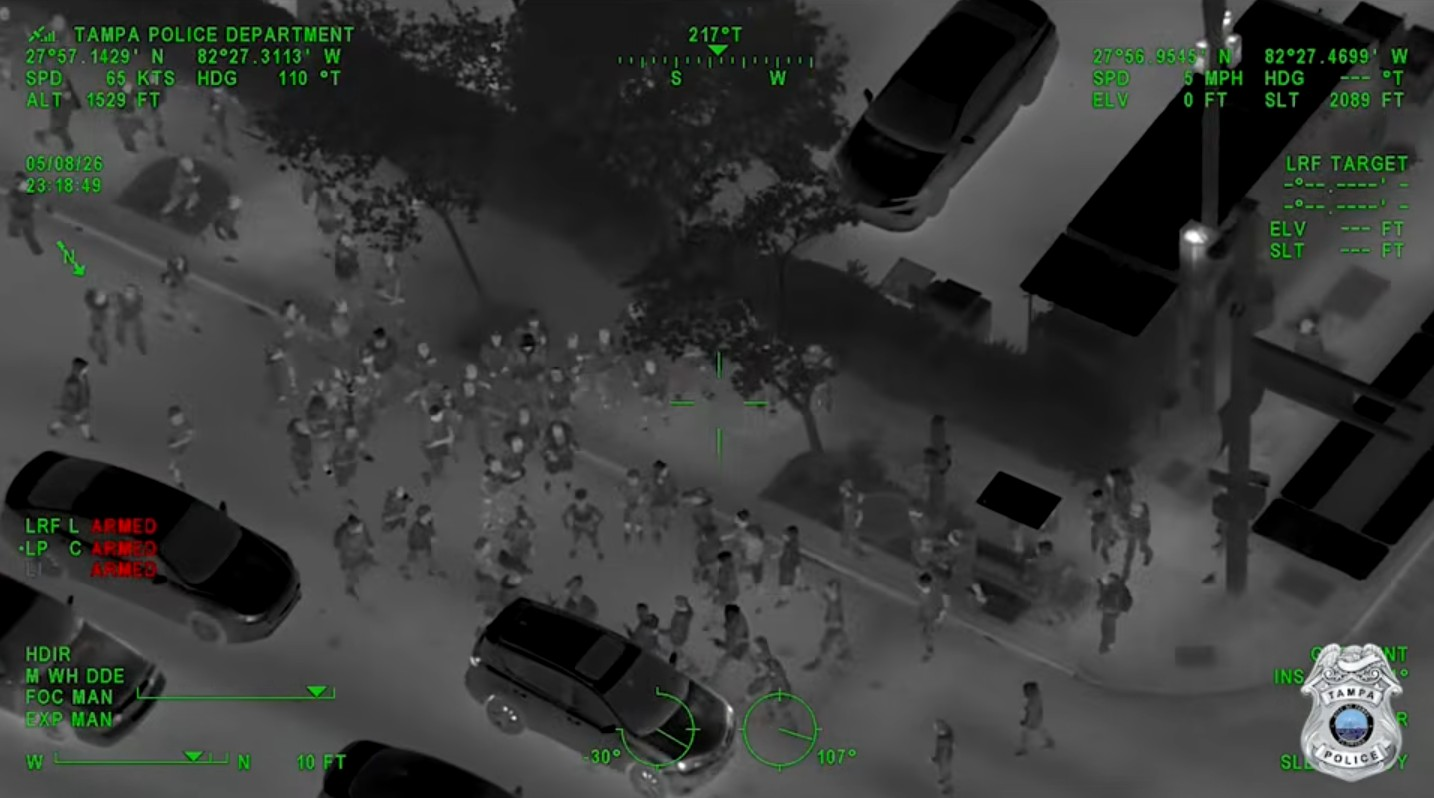
A "teen takeover" in Tampa, Florida

== History ==
The term "mall takeover" emerged in February 2026 at malls in major United States metropolitan areas, like the Cumberland Mall in Atlanta, Georgia, the Green Acres Mall in Valley Stream, New York, the Short Pump Town Center in Henrico County, Virginia, and the Northshore Mall in Peabody, Massachusetts. Such takeovers have led to violence and arrests:

- On May 16, 2026, at Christiana Mall in New Castle County, Delaware, led to the arrest of six juveniles after multiple fights broke out among a crowd of nearly 100 teenagers. Multiple law enforcement agencies responded to disperse the crowd, which had overwhelmed the parking lot and surrounding areas.
- On March 29, 2026, at Bayshore Mall in Milwaukee, Wisconsin, youths were filmed fighting one another. 13 were arrested following a large police response.
- On March 30, 2026, a takeover in Milwaukee's Moody Park led to fights, gunfire and arrests.
- On May 19, 2026, several hundred people flooded streets and danced on cars while getting into fights in Long Branch, New Jersey.
- On July 4, 2026, a 19-year-old man was killed and 6 others were injured in a shooting at a takeover in downtown Pensacola, Florida.
- On July 4, 2026 in Raleigh, NC, 3,000 teens gathered in Brier Creek and more than 5,000 gathered in Glenwood South resulting in 8 injuries from gunfire.

== Response ==
Some of these events, such as the one at the Northshore Mall, were stopped before they could take place, while others were stopped after incidents occurred. Curfews were met with calls for more youth advocacy, from groups such as BUILD on the West Side of Chicago.

== Nomenclature ==
The term "teen takeover" precedes "mall takeover," coming from the summer of 2019 as a reaction to more violent events in Chicago, attributed to events organized by social media flyers.

== See also ==
- Juvenile delinquency
