= Speed limits in the United States =

Map of highest posted speed limits in US states or counties

Map of highest undivided road speed limits in US states or counties

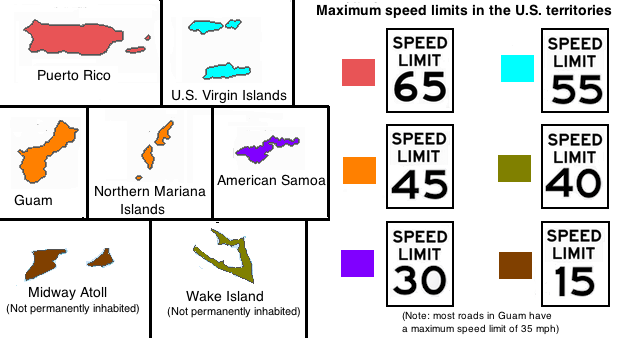
Map of highest posted speed limits in the U.S. territories

In the United States, speed limits are set by each state or territory. States have also allowed counties and municipalities to enact typically lower limits. Highway speed limits can range from an urban low of 25 mph (40 km/h) to a rural high of 85 mph (137 km/h). Speed limits are typically posted in increments of five miles per hour (8 km/h). Some states have lower limits for trucks; some also have night and/or minimum speed limits.

The highest speed limits are generally 70 mph (113 km/h) on the West Coast and the inland eastern states, 75–80 mph (121–129 km/h) in inland western states, along with Arkansas, Missouri Louisiana, Maine, and Michigan; and 65–70 mph (105–113 km/h) on the Eastern Seaboard. Alaska, Connecticut, Delaware, Massachusetts, New Jersey, New York, Puerto Rico, Rhode Island, and Vermont have a maximum limit of 65 mph (105 km/h), and Hawaii has a maximum limit of 60 mph (97 km/h). The District of Columbia and the U.S. Virgin Islands have a maximum speed limit of 55 mph (89 km/h). Guam and the Northern Mariana Islands have speed limits of 45 mph (72 km/h). American Samoa has a maximum speed limit of 30 mph (48 km/h). Two territories in the U.S. Minor Outlying Islands have their own speed limits: 40 mph (64 km/h) in Wake Island, and 15 mph (24 km/h) in Midway Atoll. Unusual for any state east of the Mississippi River, much of Interstate 95 (I-95) in Maine north of Bangor allows up to 75 mph (121 km/h), and the same is true for up to 600 mi (966 km) of freeways in Michigan. Portions of the Idaho, Montana, Nevada, North Dakota, Oklahoma, South Dakota, Texas, Utah, and Wyoming road networks have 80 mph (129 km/h) posted limits. The highest posted speed limit in the country is 85 mph (137 km/h) and can be found only on Texas State Highway 130, a toll road that bypasses the Austin metropolitan area for long-distance traffic. The highest speed limit for undivided roads is 75 mph (121 km/h) in Texas. Undivided road speed limits vary greatly by state. Texas is the only state with a 75 mph (121 km/h) speed limit on 2 lane undivided roads, while most states east of the Mississippi are limited to 55 mph (89 km/h).

A standard sign indicating a speed limit of 80 mph (129 km/h), a night-time speed limit of 65 mph (105 km/h), and a truck speed limit of 55 mph (89 km/h)

During World War II, the U.S. Office of Defense Transportation established a national 35 mph "Victory Speed Limit" (also known as "War Speed") to conserve gasoline and rubber for the American war effort, from May 1942 to August 1945, when the war ended. For 13 years (January 1974–April 1987), federal law withheld Federal Highway Trust Funds to states that had speed limits above 55 mph (89 km/h). From April 1987 to December 8, 1995, an amended federal law allowed speed limits up to 65 mph (105 km/h) on rural Interstate and rural roads built to Interstate highway standards.

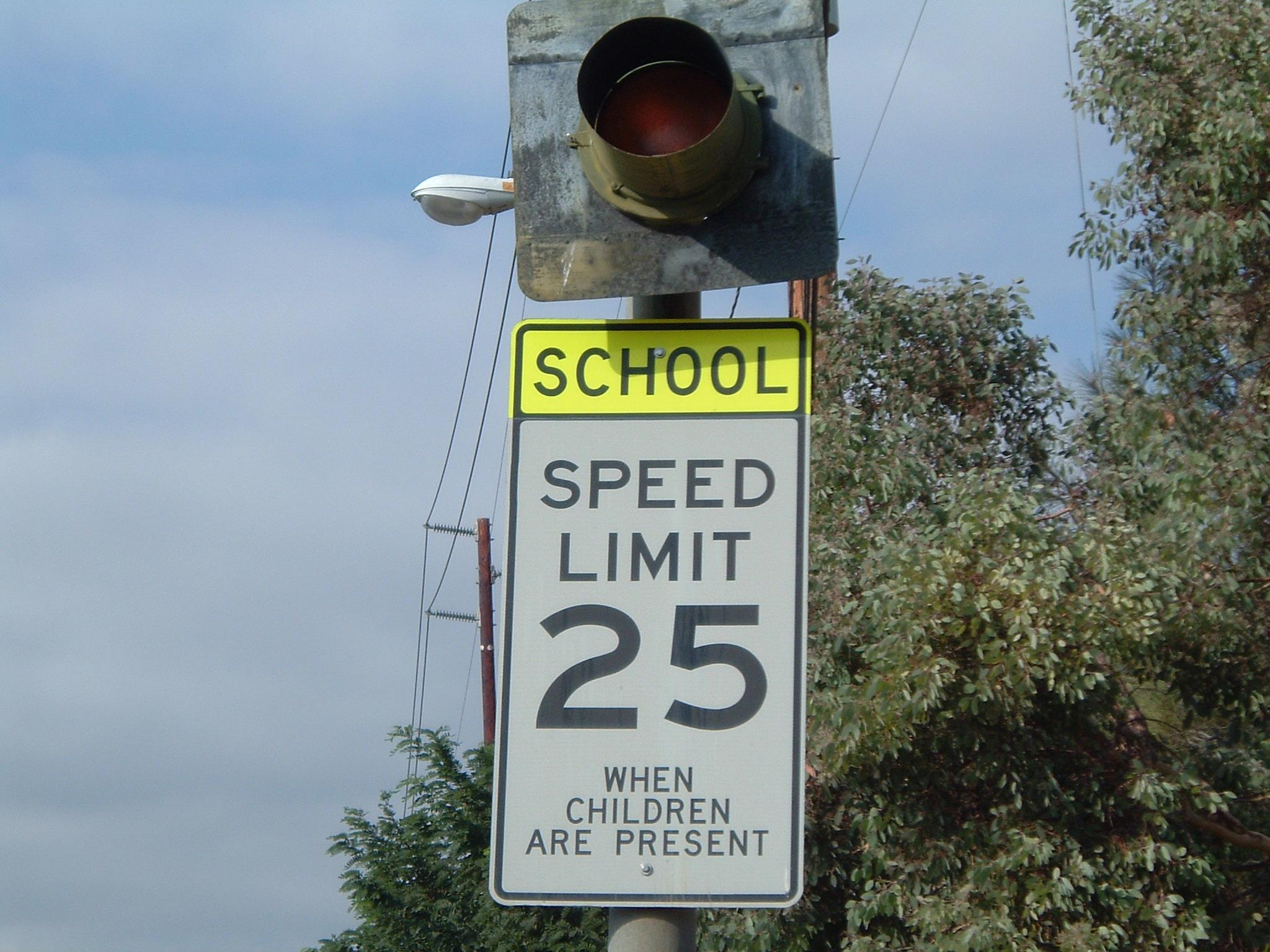
Speed limit sign at a school zone with flashing beacon

== Overview ==
=== Speed limits ===
This table contains the most usual posted daytime speed limits, in miles per hour, on typical roads in each category. The values shown are not necessarily the fastest or slowest. They usually indicate, but not always, statutory speed limits. Some states and territories have lower truck speed limits applicable to heavy trucks. If present, they are usually only on freeways or other high-speed roadways. Some states allow for higher speed limits pursuant to an engineering study that are not currently posted. For instance, Missouri and Washington allow for speeds up to 75 mph (121 km/h), but the highest posted signs are 70 mph (113 km/h). Mississippi allows speeds up to 80 mph (129 km/h) on toll roads, but no such roads exist. Other states, such as Alabama and Minnesota, do not have statutory restrictions on the highest allowed speed limits pursuant to an engineering study.

Legend:

Freeway: Interstate Highway or other state or U.S. Route built to Interstate standards.

Divided rural: State or U.S. route, generally with four or more lanes, not built to Interstate standards, but with a median or other divider separating directions of travel.

Undivided rural: County, State, or U.S. route, generally with two to four lanes, with no separator between directions of travel.

Residential Street/residential: Residential streets, business districts, or School zones.

State or territory	Freeway (rural)	Freeway (trucks)	Freeway (urban)	Minimum speed (freeways)	Divided (rural)	Undivided (rural)	Residential
Alabama	70 mph (113 km/h)		50–70 mph (80–113 km/h)		65 mph (105 km/h)	55–65 mph (89–105 km/h)	20–25 mph (32–40 km/h)
Alaska	65 mph (105 km/h)		55–65 mph (89–105 km/h)		55–65 mph (89–105 km/h)	45–65 mph (72–105 km/h)	20–25 mph (32–40 km/h)
American Samoa	no freeways or divided roads in American Samoa					25–30 mph (40–48 km/h)	15 mph (24 km/h)
Arizona	65–75 mph (105–121 km/h)		55–65 mph (89–105 km/h)		55–65 mph (89–105 km/h)	45–65 mph (72–105 km/h)	20–25 mph (32–40 km/h)
Arkansas	70–75 mph (113–121 km/h)	70 mph (113 km/h)	60–65 mph (97–105 km/h)		65 mph (105 km/h)	55–65 mph (89–105 km/h)	20–30 mph (32–48 km/h)
California	65–70 mph (105–113 km/h)	55 mph (89 km/h)	50–65 mph (80–105 km/h)		65–70 mph (105–113 km/h) (Note: Non-freeway speed limits of 70 mph (113 km/h) are only found on certain federal and military facilities that are not subject to the jurisdiction of California, even if such may be accessible by the public.)	55–70 mph (89–113 km/h)	20–30 mph (32–48 km/h)
Colorado	65–75 mph (105–121 km/h)		55–75 mph (89–121 km/h)		55–65 mph (89–105 km/h)		20–35 mph (32–56 km/h)
Connecticut	65 mph (105 km/h)		45–65 mph (72–105 km/h)	40 mph (64 km/h)	50–55 mph (80–89 km/h)	40–50 mph (64–80 km/h)	20–40 mph (32–64 km/h)
Delaware	65 mph (105 km/h)		50–65 mph (80–105 km/h)		55 mph (89 km/h)	50 mph (80 km/h)	25–35 mph (40–56 km/h)
(Washington, D.C.) District of Columbia	no rural freeways in D.C.		40–55 mph (64–89 km/h)		no rural roads in D.C.		20–25 mph (32–40 km/h)
Florida	70 mph (113 km/h)		50–70 mph (80–113 km/h)	40–50 mph (64–80 km/h)	55–65 mph (89–105 km/h)	55–60 mph (89–97 km/h)	20–50 mph (32–80 km/h)
(Georgia (U.S. state)) Georgia	70 mph (113 km/h)		55–70 mph (89–113 km/h)	40 mph (64 km/h)	55–65 mph (89–105 km/h)	45–55 mph (72–89 km/h)	25–45 mph (40–72 km/h)
Guam	no freeways in Guam				35–45 mph (56–72 km/h)		35 mph (56 km/h)
Hawaii	55–60 mph (89–97 km/h)		45–55 mph (72–89 km/h)	35–45 mph (56–72 km/h)	45–55 mph (72–89 km/h)	45–60 mph (72–97 km/h)	25 mph (40 km/h)
Idaho	70–80 mph (113–129 km/h)		60–65 mph (97–105 km/h)		65–70 mph (105–113 km/h)	55–70 mph (89–113 km/h)	25–35 mph (40–56 km/h)
Illinois	70 mph (113 km/h)	60 mph (97 km/h) (seen in chicago suburbs)	45–70 mph (72–113 km/h)	45 mph (72 km/h)	55–65 mph (89–105 km/h)	45–55 mph (72–89 km/h)	20–30 mph (32–48 km/h)
Indiana	70 mph (113 km/h)	60–65 mph (97–105 km/h)	50–70 mph (80–113 km/h)		55–60 mph (89–97 km/h)	50–55 mph (80–89 km/h)	20–30 mph (32–48 km/h)
Iowa	65–70 mph (105–113 km/h)		55–65 mph (89–105 km/h)	40 mph (64 km/h)	65 mph (105 km/h)	45–60 mph (72–97 km/h)	25 mph (40 km/h)
Kansas	75 mph (121 km/h)		55–75 mph (89–121 km/h)	40 mph (64 km/h)	65–70 mph (105–113 km/h)	55–65 mph (89–105 km/h)	20–30 mph (32–48 km/h)
Kentucky	70 mph (113 km/h)		50–70 mph (80–113 km/h)		65 mph (105 km/h)	55 mph (89 km/h)	25–45 mph (40–72 km/h)
Louisiana	70–75 mph (113–121 km/h)		50–70 mph (80–113 km/h)		55–65 mph (89–105 km/h)	45–55 mph (72–89 km/h)	20–45 mph (32–72 km/h)
Maine	65–75 mph (105–121 km/h)		50–65 mph (80–105 km/h)		45–55 mph (72–89 km/h)	45–55 mph (72–89 km/h)	25 mph (40 km/h)
Maryland	70 mph (110 km/h)		40-65 mph (64-105 km/h)		55 mph (89 km/h)	50–55 mph (80–89 km/h)	15–35 mph (24–56 km/h)
Massachusetts	65 mph (105 km/h)		45–65 mph (72–105 km/h)		45–55 mph (72–89 km/h)	45–55 mph (72–89 km/h)	20–30 mph (32–48 km/h)
Michigan	70–75 mph (113–121 km/h)	65 mph (105 km/h)	55–70 mph (89–113 km/h)	45-55 mph (72-89 km/h)	55–65 mph (89–105 km/h)		25 mph (40 km/h)
(United States) Midway Atoll	no freeways or divided roads in the Midway Islands					15 mph (24 km/h)	
Minnesota	70 mph (113 km/h)		45–65 mph (72–105 km/h)	40 mph (64 km/h)	60–65 mph (97–105 km/h)	55–60 mph (89–97 km/h)	30 mph (48 km/h)
Mississippi	70 mph (113 km/h)		60–70 mph (97–113 km/h)	40 mph (64 km/h)	65 mph (105 km/h)	55 mph (89 km/h)	25 mph (40 km/h)
Missouri	70–75 mph (113–121 km/h) (Note: Although the maximum posted speed limit in the state is 70 mph (113 km/h), state law allows a maximum posted speed of 75 mph (121 km/h) (for possible raising of speed limits in the future) on rural freeways.)		45–70 mph (72–113 km/h)	40 mph (64 km/h)	60–70 mph (97–113 km/h)	45–65 mph (72–105 km/h)	25–40 mph (40–64 km/h)
Montana	75–80 mph (121–129 km/h)	70 mph (113 km/h)	65 mph (105 km/h)		65–75 mph (105–121 km/h)	55–70 mph (89–113 km/h)	20–25 mph (32–40 km/h)
Nebraska	75 mph (121 km/h)		50–75 mph (80–121 km/h)	40 mph (64 km/h)	65–70 mph (105–113 km/h)	55–65 mph (89–105 km/h)	25 mph (40 km/h)
Nevada	65–80 mph (105–129 km/h)		65 mph (105 km/h)		65–75 mph (105–121 km/h)	55–70 mph (89–113 km/h)	20–30 mph (32–48 km/h)
New Hampshire	65–70 mph (105–113 km/h)		45–65 mph (72–105 km/h)	45 mph (72 km/h)	55 mph (89 km/h)	35–55 mph (56–89 km/h)	20–30 mph (32–48 km/h)
New Jersey	65 mph (105 km/h)		50–65 mph (80–105 km/h)		55 mph (89 km/h)	30–55 mph (48–89 km/h)	20–35 mph (32–56 km/h)
New Mexico	75 mph (121 km/h)		55–75 mph (89–121 km/h)		55–75 mph (89–121 km/h)	55–70 mph (89–113 km/h)	20–55 mph (32–89 km/h)
(New York (state)) New York	65 mph (105 km/h)		40–65 mph (64–105 km/h)		45–55 mph (72–89 km/h)	35–55 mph (56–89 km/h)	20–45 mph (32–72 km/h)
North Carolina	65–70 mph (105–113 km/h)		50–70 mph (80–113 km/h)		55–60 mph (89–97 km/h)	55 mph (89 km/h)	20–35 mph (32–56 km/h)
North Dakota	70–80 mph (110–130 km/h)		55–70 mph (89–113 km/h)		70 mph (113 km/h)	55–70 mph (89–113 km/h)	20–55 mph (32–89 km/h)
Northern Mariana Islands	no freeways in Northern Mariana Islands				45 mph (72 km/h)	25 mph (40 km/h)	
Ohio	70 mph (113 km/h)		50–70 mph (80–113 km/h)	40 mph (64 km/h)	55–70 mph (89–113 km/h)	45–55 mph (72–89 km/h)	20–35 mph (32–56 km/h)
Oklahoma	70–80 mph (113–129 km/h)		55–65 mph (89–105 km/h)	45-60 mph (72-97 km/h)	65–70 mph (105–113 km/h)	55–70 mph (89–113 km/h)	25 mph (40 km/h)
Oregon	65–70 mph (105–113 km/h)	60–65 mph (97–105 km/h)	50–60 mph (80–97 km/h)		55–70 mph (89–113 km/h)		20–25 mph (32–40 km/h)
Pennsylvania	55–70 mph (89–113 km/h)		40–70 mph (64–113 km/h)		55 mph (89 km/h)	35–55 mph (56–89 km/h)	20–35 mph (32–56 km/h)
Puerto Rico	60–65 mph (97–105 km/h)	55 mph (89 km/h)	50–55 mph (80–89 km/h)		55 mph (89 km/h)	45–55 mph (72–89 km/h)	25–35 mph (40–56 km/h)
Rhode Island	65 mph (105 km/h)		45–55 mph (72–89 km/h)		55 mph (89 km/h)	50 mph (80 km/h)	20–25 mph (32–40 km/h)
South Carolina	65–70 mph (105–113 km/h)		50–65 mph (80–105 km/h)	45 mph (72 km/h)	60 mph (97 km/h)	45–55 mph (72–89 km/h)	20–30 mph (32–48 km/h)
South Dakota	75–80 mph (121–129 km/h)		60–75 mph (97–121 km/h)	40 mph (64 km/h)	65–70 mph (105–113 km/h)	55–65 mph (89–105 km/h)	20–45 mph (32–72 km/h)
Tennessee	65–70 mph (105–113 km/h)		55–70 mph (89–113 km/h)		55–65 mph (89–105 km/h)	35–65 mph (56–105 km/h)	20–35 mph (32–56 km/h)
Texas	70–85 mph (113–137 km/h) (Note: Speed limits are generally 75 mph (121 km/h) on rural freeways. Rural portions of I-10 and I-20 are posted at 80 mph (129 km/h) towards the extreme west side of the state and 70–75 mph (113–121 km/h) towards the extreme east side of the state. Only one roadway is posted at 85 mph (137 km/h), being SH-130 south of Austin.)		55–75 mph (89–121 km/h)		65–75 mph (105–121 km/h)	55–75 mph (89–121 km/h)	25–30 mph (40–48 km/h)
(United States Virgin Islands) U.S. Virgin Islands	no freeways in the United States Virgin Islands				55 mph (89 km/h)	30–40 mph (48–64 km/h)	20–25 mph (32–40 km/h)
Utah	75–80 mph (121–129 km/h)		65–70 mph (105–113 km/h)	45 mph (72 km/h) Not Posted	55–65 mph (89–105 km/h)	55–65 mph (89–105 km/h)	20–35 mph (32–56 km/h)
Vermont	65 mph (105 km/h)		55 mph (89 km/h)	40 mph (64 km/h)	55 mph (89 km/h)	50–55 mph (80–89 km/h)	20–50 mph (32–80 km/h)
Virginia	65–70 mph (105–113 km/h)		55–70 mph (89–113 km/h)		55–60 mph (89–97 km/h)	55 mph (89 km/h)	20–35 mph (32–56 km/h)
Wake Island	no freeways or divided roads in Wake Island					40 mph (64 km/h)	
(Washington (state)) Washington	70 mph (113 km/h)	60 mph (97 km/h)			60–70 mph (97–113 km/h)	55–65 mph (89–105 km/h)	20–50 mph (32–80 km/h)
West Virginia	70 mph (113 km/h)		55–65 mph (89–105 km/h)		65 mph (105 km/h)	55 mph (89 km/h)	20–55 mph (32–89 km/h)
Wisconsin	70 mph (113 km/h)		50–70 mph (80–113 km/h)		65 mph (105 km/h)	55 mph (89 km/h)	20–35 mph (32–56 km/h)
Wyoming	75–80 mph (121–129 km/h)		60–75 mph (97–121 km/h)		70 mph (113 km/h)	55–70 mph (89–113 km/h)	30 mph (48 km/h)

legend:

Freeway: Interstate Highway or other state- or federally numbered road built to Interstate standards.

Divided: State- or federally numbered road, generally with four or more lanes, not built to Interstate standards, but with a median or other divider separating directions of travel.

Undivided rural: County, State, or U.S. route, generally with two to four lanes, with no separator between directions of travel.

Residential Street/residential: Residential streets, business districts, or School zones.

=== Examples of penalties ===
State	Typical fine and whether absolute or prima facie*	Recklessness threshold or enhanced penalty	Ticket dismissal options	Point system
Arizona	(Not available or information needed.) Prima facie (Absolute above 85 mph (137 km/h))	Over 35 mph (56 km/h) in a school zone, or over 20 mph (32 km/h) above the posted speed limit.	Defensive driving school (requires court approval for criminal speeding tickets).	Point system leading to fines, potential license suspension, increased insurance rates, and potential jail time (if criminal).
California	$35 for up to 15 mph (24 km/h) over, $70 for up to 25 mph (40 km/h) $100 for over 25 mph over. All traffic fines doubled in construction zones. Prima facie (Absolute above 55 mph (89 km/h) on a 2-lane road or above 65 mph (105 km/h) on a divided highway)	Over 100 mph (160 km/h) results in a mandatory court appearance and possible 30-day license suspension	Traffic school once every 18 months, except for offenses resulting in a mandatory court appearance.	Point system with license suspensions.
Colorado	A minimum amount of $15 up to a maximum amount of $100 plus additional court surcharges and costs. In cases where the violation occurred in a maintenance, repair, or construction zone, the fine amount will be doubled by the court.	A Class 2 Traffic Misdemeanor Offense and a conviction may result in a scheduled fine of $150 to $300 plus court costs and surcharges, a possible jail sentence of 10 to 90 days.	Depends on violations.	Point system between 0 and 12. A conviction for any 12-point Speeding Ticket will automatically result in a MANDATORY suspension of the driver's license for up to 1 year, regardless of the person's driving history.
North Carolina	$10–$50 plus court costs. Speeding fines in work zones and school zones are $250 plus court costs. Absolute	15 mph (24 km/h) over limit at a traveled speed of greater than 55 mph (89 km/h) or over 80 mph (129 km/h)	Prayer for judgment continued (PJC) available depending on the court and subject to their discretion, but not available for charges of exceeding a speed limit by more than 25 mph (40 km/h).	Point system may lead to license suspension. Exceeding the speed limit by more than 15 mph (24 km/h) with a speed of greater than 55 mph (89 km/h) or travelling faster than 80 mph (129 km/h) results in a minimum 30-day license suspension.
Pennsylvania	$35 plus court and other costs. All fines doubled in active work zones. Absolute	Over 30 mph (48 km/h) over limit	None	Point system leads to mandatory driver education and possible license suspension.
Texas	$1–$200 plus court fees. Doubled in active school zones when children are present or construction zones when workers are present. Various additional "fees" assessed by the state essentially increase the fine by around $100 on all tickets. Prima facie	None	Defensive driving (once per year) or deferred disposition (restrictions vary, but generally at least 4 per year), but only valid if: Texas resident, Speed under 25 mph (40 km/h) above limit and under 95 mph (153 km/h), and; Not in construction zone where workers are present or active school zone.; Not a Commercial Driver License (CDL) holder.	Point system is annual surcharge only. No provision for license suspension if surcharges are paid.
Rhode Island	(Not available or information needed) Prima facie		One dismissal every 3 years for speed 14 mph (23 km/h) or less over limit.	
Virginia	Up to $250; School zone: up to $250 additional; Work zone: up to $500; $200 civil penalty in certain towns; Absolute	20 mph (32 km/h) over limit or over 85 mph (137 km/h)		Point system leading to fines, suspension, and mandatory driver education.

== History ==
One of the first speed limits in what would become the United States (at the time, still a British colony) was set in Boston in 1701 by the board of selectmen (similar to a city council):

Ordered, That no person whatsoever Shall at any time hereafter ride or drive a gallop or other extream pace within any of the Streets, lanes, or alleys in this Town on penalty of forfeiting three Shillings for every such offence, and it may be lawfull for any of the Inhabitants of this Town to make Stop of such horse or Rider untill the name of the offender be known in order to prosecution

=== Federal speed controls ===
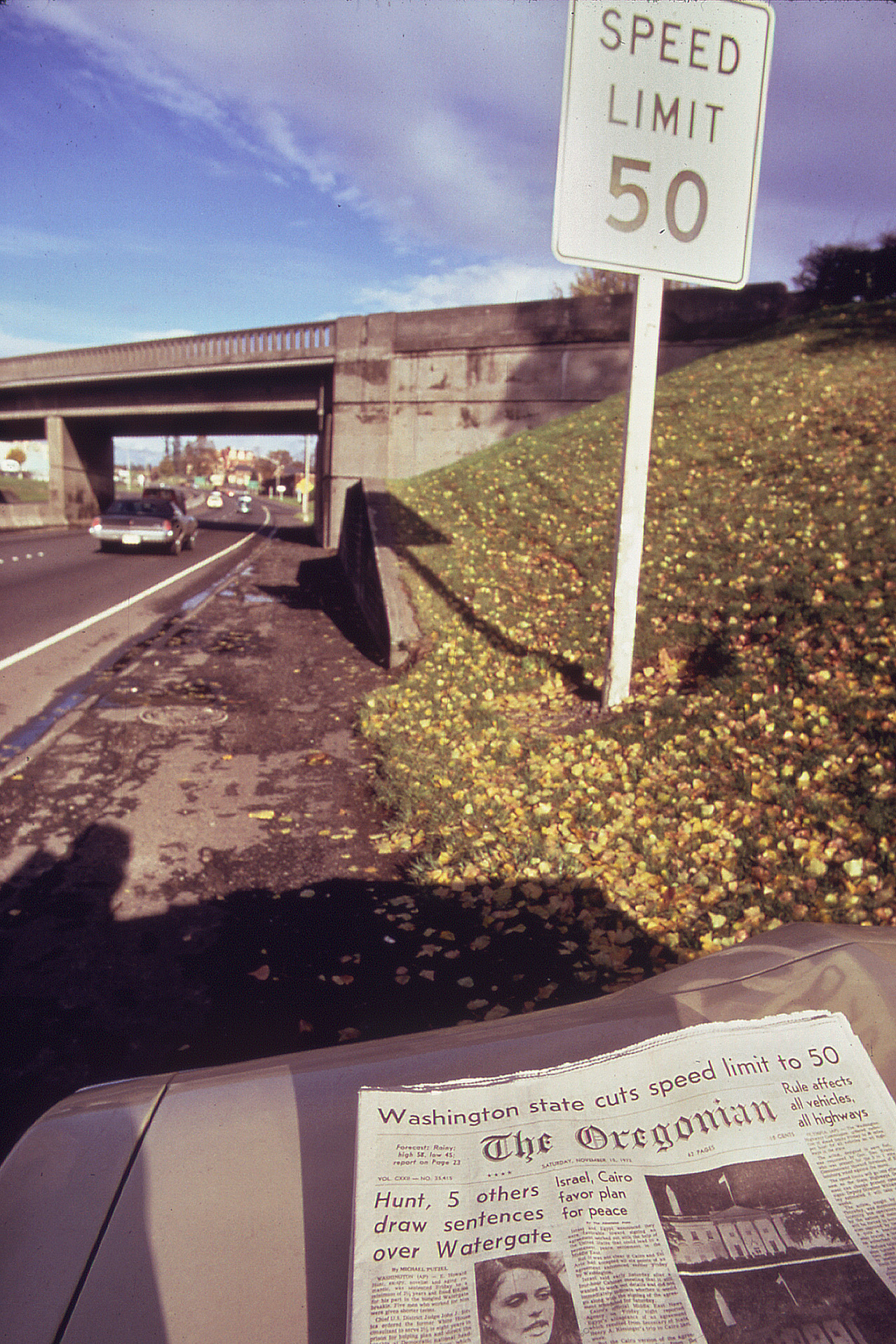
In 1973, Congress enacted a national speed limit of 55 mph (89 km/h). Some states, such as Washington, enacted lower speed limits.

In response to the 1973 oil crisis, Congress enacted the National Maximum Speed Law that created the universal 55 miles per hour (89 km/h) speed limit. States had to agree to the limit if they desired to receive federal funding for highway repair. The federal government enforced the national maximum speed limit by withholding federal funding for projects whose speed limits exceeded 55 miles per hour (89 km/h). Federal highway funding is normally allocated according to 23 U.S. Code § 106, the National Maximum Speed Law (also known as H.R.11372 - An Act to conserve energy on the Nation's highways) modified the allocation process. As stated, in part:

...the Secretary of Transportation shall not approve any project under section 106 of title 23 of the United States Code in any State which has...a maximum speed limit on any public highway within its jurisdiction in excess of 55 miles per hour...

In 1984, a comprehensive study by the National Research Council found that the lower speed limits contributed to saving 3,000 to 5,000 lives in 1974 and from 2,000 to 4,000 lives each year thereafter, due to slower and more uniform speeds on American highways.

=== 1995 repeal ===
The law was widely disregarded by motorists, even after the national maximum was increased to 65 mph (105 km/h) on certain roads in 1987 and 1988. In 1995, the law was repealed by the National Highway System Designation Act of 1995, returning the choice of speed limit to each state.

Upon that repeal, there was effectively no speed limit on Montana's highways for daytime driving (the nighttime limit was set at 65 miles per hour (105 km/h)) from 1995 until 1999, when the state Supreme Court threw out the law requiring a "reasonable and prudent" speed as "unconstitutionally vague." The state legislature enacted a 75 miles per hour (121 km/h) daytime limit in May 1999. Overall, the new speed limit law in Montana was found to be satisfactory to residents of the state.

As of May 15, 2017, 41 states have maximum speed limits of 70 mph (113 km/h) or higher. 18 of those states have 75 miles per hour (121 km/h) speed limits or higher, while 8 states of that same portion have 80 mph (129 km/h) speed limits, with Texas even having an 85 miles per hour (137 km/h) speed limit on one of its toll roads. There are 8 states that have 65 miles per hour (105 km/h) speed limits. Hawaii has the lowest maximum speed limit, with its freeways and Saddle Road being signed at up to 60 miles per hour (97 km/h).

There is mixed evidence of the 1995 repeal's effect on fatalities. On one hand, statistical records of motor vehicle fatalities indicate that total traffic deaths in the United States have declined from 41,817 that year to 32,479 in 2011, the lowest level in 60 years, before increasing to 37,133 in 2017.

On the other hand, the Insurance Institute for Highway Safety (IIHS) published a study in April 2019 that controlled for general time trends, the unemployment rate, percentage of young drivers, and safety belt use rate. The study concluded the increase of speed limits not only increases the speed of vehicles but can also generate additional deaths: "A 5 mph increase in the maximum state speed limit was associated with an 8.5% increase in fatality rates on interstates/freeways and a 2.8% increase on other roads."

== Truck speed limits ==
Some jurisdictions set lower speed limits that are applicable only to large commercial vehicles like heavy trucks and buses. While they are called "truck speed limits", they generally do not apply to light trucks.

A 1987 study said that crash involvement significantly increases when trucks drive much slower than passenger vehicles, suggesting that the difference in speed between passenger vehicles and slower trucks could cause crashes that otherwise may not happen. In a review of available research, the Transportation Research Board said "[no] conclusive evidence could be found to support or reject the use of differential speed limits for passenger cars and heavy trucks" and "a strong case cannot be made on empirical grounds in support of or in opposition to differential speed limits". Another study said that two thirds (67%) of truck/passenger car crashes are the fault of the passenger vehicle.

== Minimum speed limits and night speed limits ==
Sign showing 65 mph (105 km/h) maximum and 40 mph (64 km/h) minimum

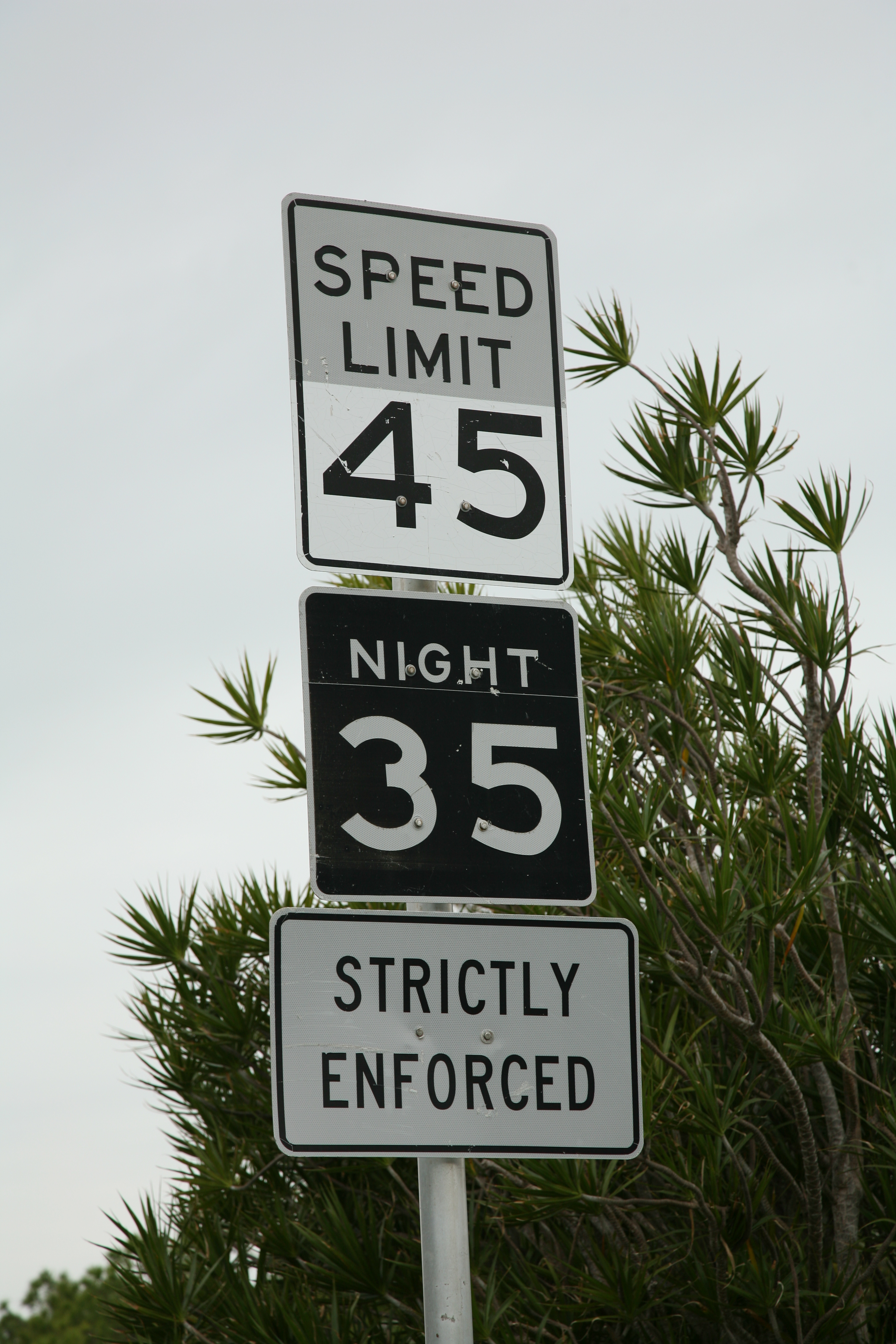
Night speed limit sign with nonreflective backing for day limit such that headlights at night render only the night limit visible

In addition to the legally defined maximum speed, minimum speed limits may be applicable. Occasionally there are default minimum speed limits for certain types of roads, generally freeways. Numeric night speed limits are occasionally used.

== Political considerations ==
=== Financial concerns ===
Traffic violations can be a lucrative income source for jurisdictions and insurance companies. For example:

- The town of Westlake, Texas, took in $42,000 per citizen over nine years for its speed traps.
- Insurance companies may receive several billions of dollars annually in traffic ticket surcharges.
- A study by the Federal Reserve of St. Louis found that traffic ticket writing increases when government revenue decreases.
- 2008 debates over traffic enforcement in Dallas County, Texas, involved concerns of lost profits if ticket writing decreased.
- In Massachusetts, half of the ticket money goes to the police department that writes the speeding ticket, the other half goes to fund the court that convicts the speeder or collects the fine from them.

Thus, an authority that sets and enforces speed limits, such as a state government, regulates and taxes insurance companies, who also gain revenue from speeding enforcement. Furthermore, such an authority often requires "all" drivers to have policies with those same companies, solidifying the association between the state and auto insurers. If a driver cannot be covered under an insurance policy because of high risk, the state will assume that high risk for a greater monetary amount; thus resulting in even more revenue generation for the state.

When a speed limit is deemed to be used to generate revenue, it is called a speed trap. The town of New Rome, Ohio, was such a speed trap, where speeding tickets raised up to $400,000 per year to fund the police department of a 12-acre village with 60 residents.

=== Environmental concerns ===
Reduced speed limits are sometimes enacted for air quality reasons. The most prominent example includes Texas' environmental speed limits.

=== Definition of speeding ===
Either of the following qualifies a crash as speed-related in accordance with U.S. government rules:

1. Exceeding speed limits.
2. Driving too fast for conditions.

Speeds in excess of speed limits account for most speed-related traffic citations; generally, "driving too fast for conditions" tickets are issued only after an incident where the ticket issuer found tangible evidence of unreasonable speed, such as a crash. Driving too fast for conditions is sometimes cited when a motorist is caught exceeding the posted speed limit, but the speed falls below a state's "default" speed limit codified in law. This makes it difficult for the motorist to get out of a ticket by claiming the speed at which he or she was travelling was within the state's legal speed limit, despite the lower posted speed limit for which the motorist may or may not have been aware of.

A criticism of the "exceeding speed limits" definition of speeding is twofold:

1. When speed limits are arbitrary, such as when set through political rather than empirical processes, the speed limit's relationship to the maximum safe speed is weakened or intentionally eliminated. Therefore, a crash can be counted as speed-related even if it occurs at a safe speed, simply because the speed was in excess of a politically determined limit.
2. The effective limit may still be too fast for certain conditions, such as limited visibility or reduced road traction or even low-speed truck rollovers on exit ramps.

Variable speed limits offer some potential to reduce speed-related crashes. However, due to the high cost of implementation, they exist primarily on freeways. Furthermore, most speed-related crashes occur on local and collector roads, which generally have far lower speed limits and prevailing speeds than freeways.

==== Prima facie ====
Most states have absolute speed limits, meaning that a speed in excess of the limit is illegal per se. However, some states have prima facie speed limits, which apply only where the motorist or state does not prove that a different limit was reasonable and prudent in the case of a specific speeding charge.

Speed limits in various states, including Texas, Utah, Massachusetts, New Hampshire, Connecticut, Ohio, Oregon, and Rhode Island are prima facie. Some other states have a hybrid system: speed limits may be prima facie up to a certain speed or only on certain roads. For example, speed limits in California up to 55 mph, or 65 mph on highways, are prima facie, and those at or above those speeds are absolute.

A successful prima facie defense is rare. Not only does the burden of proof rest upon the accused, a successful defense may involve expenses well in excess of the cost of a ticket, such as an expert witness. Furthermore, because prima facie defenses must be presented in a court, such a defense is difficult for out-of-town motorists.

== Metric speed limits ==
Values of metric speed limits in the US were inside circles.

Metric speed limits are no longer included in the Federal Highway Administration's Manual on Uniform Traffic Control Devices (MUTCD), which provides guidelines for speed limit signage, and therefore, new installations are not legal in the United States. Before 2009, a speed limit could be defined in kilometers per hour (km/h) as well as miles per hour (mph). The 2003 version of the MUTCD stated that "speed limits shown shall be in multiples of 10 km/h or 5 mph." If a speed limit sign indicated km/h, the number was circumscribed and "km/h" was written below. Prior to 2003, metric speed limits were designated using the standard speed limit sign, usually with yellow supplemental "METRIC" and "km/h" plaques above it and below it, respectively.

In 1995, the National Highway System Designation Act prohibited use of federal funds to finance new metric signage.

== See also ==
- Driver License Compact
- "I Can't Drive 55"
- Non-Resident Violator Compact
- Solomon curve
- Traffic violations reciprocity
- Transportation safety in the United States
- Traffic code in the United States
