= Traffic violations reciprocity =

Traffic law

Under traffic violations reciprocity agreements, non-resident drivers are treated like residents when they are stopped for a traffic offense that occurs in another jurisdiction. They also ensure that punishments such as penalty points on one's license and the ensuing increase in insurance premiums follow the driver home. The general principle of such interstate, interprovincial, and/or international compacts is to guarantee the rule "one license, one record."

== Australia ==
- The Australian States and Territories have all passed legislation regarding the recognition of demerit points and licence suspensions in other states/territories.

== Canada ==
- Canadian Driver License Compact which is similar to the US Driver License Compact.
- Driver License Agreement

== European Union ==
In the European Union, the European directive facilitating cross-border exchange of information and mutual assistance on road-safety-related traffic offences to collect fines and driver disqualifications by the jurisdictions of member countries across borders within all member countries only focus on 18 road-safety-related traffic offences.

== France ==
France has an agreement with Spain and Switzerland for recognition of licence points and suspension and is working on agreements with other countries, especially the UK.

== United Kingdom ==
One driver registration system applies to both England and Wales and Scotland; driving disqualifications and penalty points apply immediately in both jurisdictions. There is mutual recognition of driving disqualifications with Northern Ireland and the Republic of Ireland.1

== Mexico ==
- Driver License Agreement

== Northern Ireland ==
The driver registration system of Northern Ireland has mutual recognition of driving disqualifications with the system in Great Britain and the Republic of Ireland.2

== Ireland ==
The Republic of Ireland has mutual recognition of driving disqualifications with Great Britain and Northern Ireland.3

== United States ==
- Driver License Compact concerns records being recorded at home.
- Non-Resident Violator Compact concerns the non-compliance with an out-of-state traffic citation.
- Driver License Agreement, a new compact which combines the Driver License Compact and Non-Resident Violator Compact and includes Canada and Mexico.
