= Drug policy of Michigan =

Overview of the drug policy of the U.S. state of Michigan

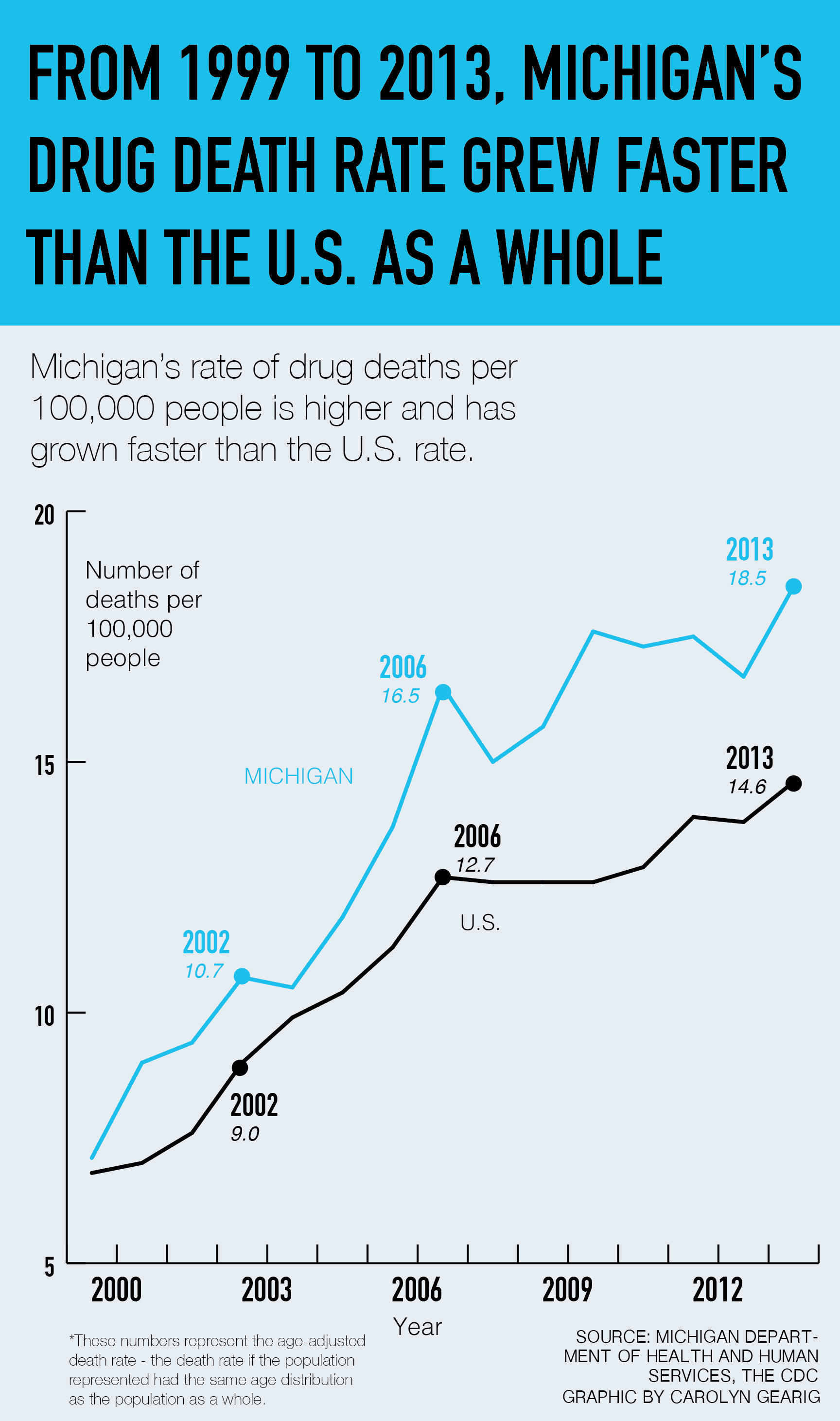
Death rates by drugs are higher in Michigan than the national rate

The U.S. state of Michigan has various policies restricting the production, sale, and use of different controlled substances. Some of the policies are unique to the state while others are similar to federal law. Laws pertaining to controlled substances can be found almost exclusively in various sections of public health code, specifically Act 368 of 1978.

== Specific drugs ==
=== Alcohol ===
In Michigan, there are various ways in which alcohol use is restricted. Minors are prohibited from purchasing, consuming and possessing alcohol; a person is considered a minor if they are under 21, and can be prosecuted committing any of these crimes. First time minor offenders will receive under $100 in fines. They may also be subject to abuse treatment, rehab, community service, and/or periodic screenings.

One must be at least 18 years old in order to sell or serve alcohol. The Michigan Liquor Control Code states that enforcement officers have the right to carry out an inspection of establishments that sell or serve alcohol at any time.

Michigan also has laws against drinking and driving. The Michigan Vehicle Code states that any citizen “whether licensed or not, shall not operate a vehicle upon a highway or other place open to the general public” when they are intoxicated, which is defined as having a blood alcohol content of 0.08% or greater.

Penalties for operating a vehicle while intoxicated with a blood alcohol level higher than 0.17% includes but is not limited to:

- up to a one-year suspension of driver's license
- $1000 driver responsibility fees, 2 years (consecutive)
- an addition of 6 points to driver record
- imprisonment up to 180 days
- fines not exceeding $700
- participation in an alcohol treatment program

=== Cannabis ===
Although federal law prohibits the production, sale, and use of cannabis products, in 2008 the state of Michigan passed the Michigan Medical Marihuana Act, which allows qualified individuals access to cannabis for medicinal purposes. Qualified patients as well as caregivers are required to register with the state and receive an identification card, following procedure as has been laid out by Michigan. Under this act, registered users may possess no more than 2.5 ounces of usable marijuana and, if they have not designated a primary caregiver, may have no more than 12 marijuana plants growing in a locked area. Registered users and caregivers who are found to be distributing marijuana to those not permitted to use medicinal marijuana are guilty of a felony charge and are subject to any of the following:

- the revoking of his or her registration card
- imprisonment of up to 2 years
- a fine of no more than $2,000
- any other penalties associated with the illegal distribution of marijuana
- State-licensed sales of recreational cannabis began in December 2019. Medical use was legalized in 2008 through the Michigan Compassionate Care Initiative. It passed with 63% of the vote.

Cannabis is legal in Michigan but it still is illegal under federal law and is categorized as a Schedule I controlled substance.

=== Heroin ===
Michigan's Public Health Code classifies Heroin as a Schedule 1 drug.

Possession of heroin is a felony. Possessing any mixture containing heroin is punished according to how many grams the mixture contains. Punishments are as follows:

- less than 50 grams: up to 4 years in prison or up to $25,000 in fines, or both.
- 50-450 grams: up to 20 years in prison or up to $250,000 in fines, or both.
- 450–1,000 grams: up to 30 years in prison or up to $500,000 in fines, or both.
- 1,000+ grams: ‘imprisonment for life or any term of years’ or up to $1,000,000 in fines, or both.

== Other policies ==
=== Drug-free workplace ===
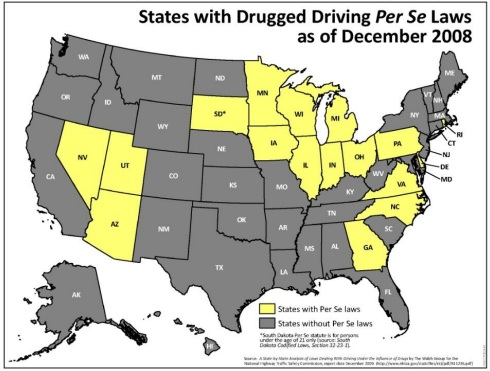
Image created for the National Highway Traffic Safety Commission

In 2009, former governor Jennifer Granholm issued a notice that specifically targeted drug use in the workplace, stating that drug use can "significantly impact the workplace and provide a serious threat to public health, safety, and welfare". The notice also made mention of educational programs and attempts made by the state of Michigan to offset the prevalence of drug use in general. This notice was not actual legislation, but was symbolic in Michigan's renewed commitment to the Drug-Free Workplace Act of 1988.

=== Per se laws ===
When it comes to driving under the influence of controlled substances and alcohol, several states have implemented per se laws, including Michigan as of September 30, 2003. In general, these laws seek to make driving with a certain amount of drugs in one's system an impaired driving offense. In Michigan, there is a zero-tolerance policy for driving while under the influence of controlled substances, such as marijuana or heroin, which are both Schedule 1 controlled substances. The per se laws also extend to driving under the influence of alcohol; the punishments associated with this offense can be found under the "alcohol" section of this page.

== See also ==
- Federal drug policy of the United States
- Occupational health concerns of cannabis use
