= Professional Truck Driver Institute =

The Professional Truck Driver Institute (PTDI) is a non-profit organization that provides certification of training courses for drivers of commercial motor vehicles. It was formed in 1986 during the standardization of commercial driver's licensing by the Federal Motor Carrier Safety Administration in the United States. Its management was taken over by the TCA in 1996. PTDI is the first nonprofit organization to develop uniform skill performance, curriculum, and certification standards for the trucking industry and to award course certification to entry-level truck driver training courses and motor carrier driver-finishing programs.

PTDI is working with NATMI, short for North American Transportation Management Institute. PTDI allied with the Commercial Vehicle Training Association CVTA in 2020. it has also published some editions of a truck driver training book with Cengage.

== Overview ==
The Professional Truck Driver Institute is a non-profit organization that offers course certification for tractor-trailer driver training courses requiring basic and safe operations theory and behind-the-wheel training of commercial 18-wheeler tractor-trailer combinations. The certification courses are offered by both private and publicly funded schools and require written and driving tests (skills and competency testing). Upon passing exams with the Department of Transportation, both State, and Federally regulated in the US, the successful candidate received a Class-A CDL, (Commercial Driver's License), formerly known as a Chauffeur's license.

In the United States, federal legislation was enacted to consolidate record keeping of the many different State's Department of Transportation. During this time, debates continued on the need for an organization capable of training administration for commercial motor carrier safety. Created in 1986, PTDI is a non-profit charitable organization that is regularly tested by transportation officials for curricula proficiency and standards. Each candidate for licensing of the CDL classes are taught to familiarize themselves with local, regional, State, and National laws governing commercial motor freight.

All states adopted standardized classes of commercial licensing under the commercial motor vehicle safety act of 1986.

== PTDI ==
U.S. enactment of more stringent record keeping of candidates seeking commercial motor carrier endorsements for their CDL may come from statistics showing a significant percentage of PTDI-certified drivers are being educated by rehabilitative services for convicted felon's prison release programs. Since rehabilitation into the community for individuals after being released from incarceration is a concern for social services, much of the focus on placement is in preventing repeat offenses. PTDI does not discriminate, although there is a personal expense for FBI background checks, and local DOT fingerprinting when the candidate wants certain endorsements with their CDL. PTDI offers intensive safety indoctrination for all licensing candidates.

== Future CDL Training ==
- PTDI focus on extensive safety training may require the inclusion of more endorsement qualification training in the near future. Trends in DOT regulations are towards identifying individuals not qualified to operate commercial vehicles on public highways. In addition to the PTDI curriculum developed with the assistance of law enforcement, candidates for hire are subjected to medical examinations, random drug testing, random vehicle inspections, intermittent weigh station permitting, vehicle registration, and operator competence assessments.
- It is within the technical ability of DOT to require GPS monitoring, breath analyzer engine start mechanisms, voice actuated mechanisms, DNA testing, retinal scanning devices, operator/vehicle internment, personality assessments, and individual character profiling.
- Although the current PTDI course is introductory, the institute's training requirements may change with the assistance of law enforcement, as future regulations are enacted.

== Publications ==
- Tractor-Trailer Truck Driver Training.

== See also ==
- Commercial Driver's License
