= Occupational health concerns of cannabis use =

Overview of occupational health concerns over the use of cannabis among workers

Occupational health concerns over the use of cannabis among workers are becoming increasingly important as cannabis becomes legal in more areas of the US. Of note, employers have concerns of workers either coming to work acutely impaired or recent use of cannabis still being detected in the body. Employment issues such as ADA law as it relates to accommodations for cannabis, paying unemployment benefits or paying out workers compensation benefits and disability claims are all important issues. While federal law still prohibits use, employers in different states have taken different stances based on whether they are federal contractors, perform safety sensitive work or whether the cannabis use is acutely impairing the employee.

Cannabis is currently the most commonly used illicit drug in the world and one of the earliest plants cultivated by humans. Early evidence of cannabis use in medicine has been found in China and India for religious and medicinal uses. Archaeological research shows early civilization cultivation of hemp in India to create a variety of products from ropes, textiles and paper. In countries, such as Nepal and China, cannabis seeds are still used today both as a pharmaceutical as well as a food enhancer. Lack of concentration, impaired learning and memory, alterations in thought formation, expression and sedation have been associated with cannabis use. Physiological signs include tachycardia, dilated pupils with injected conjunctiva, dry mouth and increased appetite.Studies have also confirmed that impairment is related on a dose response relationship.

As cannabis use increases and more states legalize use in the US, there are concerns surrounding the use of cannabis and its effects on job performance and safety. There are also concerns that the concentration of THC have increased over the past 50 years, thereby increasing the effects of the drug. The Controlled Substances Act of 1970 currently lists cannabis as a Schedule 1 drug, deeming it to be a substance with high risk of dependence, abuse and no (supervised) medical uses. The CATO institute estimates that legalizing drugs would save $41 billion per year along with $46.7 billion in revenue, if taxed at the same rates as alcohol and tobacco.

Employers and employees have faced new challenges in the workplace with the increasing legislation of cannabis. State law can have provisions, for an employer to refuse to hire based on marijuana use, under the concern of safety, productivity and company reputation. Companies that have “safety sensitive work” or include operating machinery or large vehicles are also free to institute a zero-tolerance policy for its employees. For the approximate 10 million CDL (Commercial Drivers Licenses) drivers in the USA, federal law requires they pass employer drug tests under the Omnibus Transportation Employee Safety Act of 1991.

Individual states in response to the federal government differed in how they dealt with cannabis. California was the first state to pass medical marijuana in 1996, followed by 23 other states currently permitting the use of medical marijuana.

== Cannabis issues related to public and private employers ==
In the case of U.S. v. Stacey among several others, the legality of cannabis use has been contested since citizens who argue for protection under state law, are always subject to federal charges While there has been some guidance from the Department of Justice to the DEA to reassess its priorities in the drug war and to target larger threats and substances, the interpretation is still subjective and has not prevented large scale raids on medical marijuana facilities across the country.

== State response to cannabis ==
California was the first state to pass medical marijuana in 1996, followed by 23 other states currently permitting the use of medical marijuana For the states that have legalized medical marijuana, employees and employers have had to face new challenges in the workplace. State law can have provisions, for an employer to refuse to hire based on marijuana use, under the concern of safety, productivity and company reputation. Companies that have a lot of “safety sensitive work” or include operating machinery or large vehicles are also free to institute a zero-tolerance policy for its employees. For the approximate 10 million CDL (Commercial Drivers Licenses) drivers in the USA, federal law requires they pass employer drug tests under the Omnibus Transportation Employee Safety Act of 1991.

Drivers that use cannabis show impairment both in simulator and on the road tests, mainly on the abilities to “..concentrate and maintain attention, estimate time and distance, and demonstrate coordination on divided attention tasks—all important requirements for operating a motor vehicle”

The Department of Transportation (DOT) has also stated in its Drug and Alcohol Testing Regulations that cannabis is not acceptable for any employee engaged in safety sensitive work. Currently, there are federal laws that give employers guidance and protection on how to ensure a drug free workplace despite the increase in cannabis use. According to the National Association of Attorneys General (NAAG), in Colorado the number of positive drug tests for marijuana went up by 20% between 2012-2013, compared to the national average increase of 5%

For those companies that have received federal grants and have federal contracts over $100,000, they follow The Drug Free Workplace Act of 1988, a comprehensive policy, which includes drug prevention methods, information about employee assistance programs and disciplinary consequences of drug use in the workplace Federal agencies are required to use the Substance Abuse and Mental health Services Administration (SAMHSA) procedures for testing and recommend private employers use the same criteria for consistency. The policy requires employees to report any criminal drug violations in the workplace to the employer within 5 calendar days which may subsequently result in discipline including termination, regardless of state law.

== Cannabis related to ADA issues ==
The Occupational and Safety Act of 1970 includes a general duty clause for employers to protect employees from exposure for those compounds with no regulated standards of safe exposure. It has been defined broadly as to “maintain conditions or adopt practices reasonably necessary and appropriate to protect workers on the job. The ADA prohibits employers from discriminating against disabled individuals, which is defined as “a physical or mental impairment that substantially limits one or more major life activities, a person who has a history or record of such an impairment, or a person who is perceived by others as having such an impairment.”

Employers under this law have an obligation to provide “reasonable accommodations” to the disabled employee, so they may perform the essential duties of the job, as long as those accommodations don’t pose an undue hardship on the employer". The ADA section 12114(a) however states that these rights are not granted to employee or applicant who is currently engaging in the illegal use of drugs The ADA does not require employer coverage when the employee is engaging in the “illegal use of drugs”, including marijuana which is still illegal under the Controlled Substance Act.

== Wrongful termination for cannabis ==
Coats v. Dish Network LLC, held that a “state’s lawful activities statute does not protect a worker’s off-duty use of medical marijuana because this activity is not lawful under federal law” under the ordinary meaning of “permitted by law”

== Workers compensation benefits ==
The Federal Employees Compensation Act (FECA) provides for the payment of workers’ compensation benefits, including wages and medical benefits, to civilian officers and employees of all branches of the federal government, whereas state law has oversight over its own workers’ compensation program

FECA prohibits employees from receiving compensation when the injury “was proximately… caused by the intoxication by… illegal drugs.”

== Unemployment benefits ==
Colorado Court of Appeals in Beinor v Industrial Claim Appeals agreed with the employer and held that unemployment insurance benefits could be withheld due to the violation of the employer’s zero tolerance drug policy. Worker was a sweeper using cannabis legally outside of working hours. Colorado State statue “disqualifies an individual from receiving unemployment benefits after the presence of a controlled substance was not medically prescribed was found in the worker’s system during worker hours.”

== Drug testing in the workplace ==
Cannabis has unique pharmacokinetics and metabolism which makes it a challenge to drug test for acute impairment vs recent use. THC is deposited in fat and can be detectable in urine for up to a month or more. However, it is not always an indicator of acute impairment. Further there are privacy concerns, from invasive blood testing for compounds, under the 4th Amendment of the US constitution. Variability in study designs, ethical dilemma of safety and productivity, work type and drug metabolism in users. When smoked, blood levels of THC immediately rise and are distributed primarily in the lungs and brain. THC is metabolized to the transient psychoactive substance THC-OH, which is finally converted to THC-COOH, the physiologically inactive metabolite. The immediate euphoria and subsequent impairment from THC-OH, as suggested by older studies may last about 6 hours, with some limited studies showing impairment lasting as long as 24 to 48 hours Specific studies that assess driving and impairment show a return to "...nonimpaired state within 3-6 hours.“

The method of testing cannabis in urine can be misleading, due to the potential for interpreting a positive result for THC-COOH, as an indicator of acute impairment.

As of May 10, 2020, employers in New York City cannot test employment applicants for marijuana.

== Challenges for healthcare providers ==
FSMB (Federal State Medical Boards) after reviewing over 50 major studies in the field, have offered these 10 recommendations:

1)Thoroughly document patient’s visit prior to considering cannabis use for those with good compliance. Information on the inadequacy of response to other treatment, comprehensive history and physical condition should be included.

2) Don’t treat close friends or family.

3) Inform risks and benefits.

4) Compliance Contract, concerns of diversion.

5) Regular Visits are recommended.

6) No relationships with dispensaries or cannabis companies.

== Measuring impairment for workers ==
A large study in France of over 10,000 crashes, concluded an odds ratio of 2.18 for THC level less than 1 ng/ml up to 4.72 for THC 5 ng/ml for being involved in a crash. Some researchers such as Donzé N, Ménétrey have considered categorizing impairment as the sum of THC, THC-OH and THC-COOH, which would be more accurate for assessing impairment since it would include the active metabolite; however, more research is needed along with better point of care detection. Some Norwegian studies have suggested that individuals with levels of 2-5 ng/mL experienced “moderate established impairment” and levels of THC above 5 -10 ng/ml was likely to be severe impairment.

The consensus from a meta-analysis study shows that serum levels of an average of 3.8 (ranging from 3.1 to 4.5) for oral cannabis and an average of 3.8 (ranging from 3.3 to 4.5) for smoker cannabis cause a similar impairment to a BAC of around 0.05g/dL, i.e. a 5 ng/mL cutoff would resemble the level of impairment allowed for alcohol under federal testing laws. However, since the presence of metabolites does not automatically indicate impairment, an immediate physical exam by a physician is advised to correlate findings clinically to diagnose impairment.
