= National Register =

National Register may refer to:

- National Register of Historic Places
- Canadian Register of Historic Places
- National Driver Register, United States
- National Register (Belgium)
- National Register of Electors, Canada
- National Register of Citizens, India
- National Court Register, Poland
- National Register of Champion Trees
- National Women's Register, Australia
- 'National' or 'population' registers
