= Motor vehicle declared out of service =

A motor vehicle is declared in the United States as out of service by personnel authorized to perform inspections of commercial motor vehicles and are designated as Special Agents of the Federal Motor Carrier Safety Administration. These authorized personnel are by law able to enter upon and perform inspections of any and all Commercial vehicles in operation.

An inspection report, Form MCS 63, is a Driver Equipment Compliance Check, and shall be used to record findings from a motor vehicle selected for inspection.

== Regulation ==
If a motor vehicle is declared out of service:

(1) Authorized employees shall declare and mark "out of service" any motor vehicle which by reason of its mechanical condition or load is hazardous to operate and likely to cause an accident or a breakdown. An Out of Service Vehicle Form MCS 64 shall be used to mark vehicles "out of service".

(2) No motor carrier company shall permit any driver to operate nor shall any person operate any motor vehicle declared and marked, "out of service" until all repairs required on the notice as failing Form MCS 63 have been satisfactorily completed.

This out of service violation is entered into Commercial Driver's License Information System and can result in the suspension of the drivers Commercial driver's license.

The term operate as used in this section shall include towing the vehicle unless the vehicle marked "out of service" is being towed away by means of a commercial vehicle used specifically for towing by crane or hoist, and that the vehicle combination emergency towing vehicle and the "out of service" vehicle meets the performance requirements of towing set by the Federal Motor Carrier Safety Administration

(3) No person shall remove the "Out of Service Vehicle" sticker from any motor vehicle prior to completion of all repairs required by the "out of service notice" on Form MCS63.

(4) The person or persons completing the repairs required by the "out of service notice" shall sign the "Certification of Repairman" in accordance with the terms prescribed on Form MCS 63, entering the name of shop or garage and the date and time the required repairs were completed. If the driver completes the required repairs, he/she shall sign and complete the "Certification of Repairman".

== Disposition ==
Motor carrier's disposition of Form MCS 63:

- Motor carriers shall carefully examine Forms MCS 63 and all violations or mechanical defects noted thereon shall be corrected. To the extent drivers are shown not to be in compliance with the Federal Motor Carrier Safety Regulations, appropriate corrective action shall be taken by the motor carrier.
- Motor carriers shall complete the "Motor Carrier Certification of Action Taken" on form MCS 63 in accordance with the terms prescribed thereon. Motor carriers shall return forms MCS 63 to the address indicated upon Form MCS 63 within fifteen (15) days following the date of the vehicle inspection.
