= Vehicle registration plates of Haiti =

Haiti
- Country: Haiti
- Country code: RH

Current series
- Slogan: La perle des Antilles
- Size: 300 x 152 mm
- Introduced: 2014; 12 years ago

History
- First issued: 1923; 103 years ago

Little is known about the early history of Haitian license plates. Keith Marvin thought that the earliest plates were from the early 1930s, but older plates have since been found and at least one plate from 1923 exists. Early plates were marked with Rd'H, (République d’Haïti), HA., RH, or Haïti at various times. The Haitian coat of arms appeared on the plates from 1998 to 2002, the country flag was shown on the 2002 - 2005 plates, and since 2006 the background has shown a map of the country. With the last update on the design, the slogan La perle des Antilles was added at the bottom of the plate in white colour.

== Passenger baseplates (Privé) ==
=== 1910 to 1955 ===
Image	Issued	Design	Slogan	Serial format	Serials issued	Notes
	1923	White serial number on dark blue (black?) background	None	1234	1 to ?	
	1924		None	1234	1 to ?	
	1925		None	1234	1 to ?	
	1926		None	1234	1 to ?	
	1927		None	1234	1 to ?	
	1928		None	1234	1 to ?	
1234	1929	White serial number on black background	None	1234	1 to ?	
	1930		None	1234	1 to ?	
1234	1931	Black serial number on yellow background	None	1234	1 to ?	
	1932		None	1234	1 to ?	
1234	1933	White serial number on black background	None	1234	1 to ?	
1234	1934	Black serial number on white background	None	1234	1 to ?	
	1935		None	1234	1 to ?	
1234	1936	Black serial number on white background	None	1234	1 to ?	
	1937		None	1234	1 to ?	
1234	1938	Red serial number on white background	None	1234	1 to ?	
1234	1939	White serial number on dark green background	None	1234	1 to ?	
1234	1940	White serial number on brown background	None	1234	1 to ?	
1234	1941	Yellow serial number on white background	None	1234	1 to ?	
	1942		None	1234	1 to ?	
	1943		None	1234	1 to ?	
	1944		None	1234	1 to ?	
	1945		None	1234	1 to ?	
	1946		None	1234	1 to ?	
	1947		None	1234	1 to ?	
	1948		None	1234	1 to ?	
1234	1949	Orange serial number on black background	None	1234	1 to ?	
	1950		None	1234	1 to ?	
	1951		None	1234	1 to ?	
	1952		None	1234	1 to ?	
	1953		None	1234	1 to ?	
	1954		None	1234	1 to ?	
1234	1955	White serial number on light blue background	None	1234	1 to ?	

=== 1956 to 1977 ===
In 1956, the United States, Canada and Mexico came to an agreement with the American Association of Motor Vehicle Administrators, the Automobile Manufacturers Association and the National Safety Council that standardized the size for license plates for vehicles (except those for motorcycles) at 6 inches (15 cm) in height by 12 inches (30 cm) in width, with standardized mounting holes. Like many other countries, Haiti appears to have followed this standard for their plates.

Image	Issued	Design	Slogan	Serial format	Serials issued	Notes
	1956	Black serial number on cream white background	None	1234	1 to ?	
1234	1957	Black serial number on yellow background	None	1234	1 to ?	
1234	1958	Yellow serial number on blue background	None	1234	1 to ?	
1234	1959	Green serial number on white background	None	1234	1 to ?	
1234	1960	Black serial number on yellow background	None	1234	1 to ?	
1234	1961	Black serial number on gray background	None	1234	1 to ?	
1234	1962	White serial number on dark green background	None	1234	1 to ?	
	1963		None	1234	1 to ?	
1234	1964	Orange serial number on black background	None	1234	1 to ?	
1234	1965	Yellow serial number on blue background	None	1234	1 to ?	
1234	1966	White serial number on red background	None	1234	1 to ?	
1234	1967	White serial number on green background	None	1234	1 to ?	
1234	1968	White serial number on black background	None	1234	1 to ?	
1234	1969	White serial number on red background	Perle Des Antilles	1234	1 to ?	
1234	1970	White serial number on dark blue background	Perle Des Antilles	1234	1 to ?	
1234	1971	White serial number on black background	Perle Des Antilles	1234	1 to ?	
1234	1972	Black serial number on yellow background	Perle Des Antilles	1234	1 to ?	
1234	1973	Black serial number on mint green background	Perle Des Antilles	1234	1 to ?	
1234	1974	Black serial number on pink background	Perle Des Antilles	1234	1 to ?	
1234	1975	White serial number on dark blue background	Perle Des Antilles	1234	1 to ?	
1234	1976	Black serial number on yellow background	Perle Des Antilles	1234	1 to ?	
	1977	White serial number on dark red background	Perle Des Antilles	1234	1 to ?	

=== Multiyear plates - 1978 to Present ===
Starting in 1978 Haitian plates were validated annually with stickers that showed the word "Haiti," the year of expiration, and a random serial number. Beginning circa 1998 the format of the sticker changed so that the year of expiration became the predominant feature of the sticker.

The 2006 - 2013 issue happened more than a year later than originally planned, so these plates were not used until the beginning of 2007. Different plates were issued for each geographical region of the country. The following region names were shown at the bottom of the plate: Nord-Ouest, Nord, Nord-Est, Artibonite, Centre, Ouest, Sud-Est, Sud, and Grand Anse. Only a single plate was issued. The front plate was replaced by a windshield sticker that would break apart if someone tried to remove it. Owners of vehicles had the choice to register their vehicle where they lived or where they worked. If they moved away from where their vehicle was registered, then the vehicle would need to be re-registered. All plates had two letters followed by five numbers (AB 12345). At the same time as this new system was implemented, right-hand drive vehicles were banned from being imported into Haiti.

The 2014 issue started 1 October 2014, and the plate backgrounds were given different colors based on the vehicle type. Known colors are pale blue for private vehicles, heavy vehicles, demonstration, and rental vehicles; pale red for dedicated to public transport and that of goods; and pale green is reserved for the diplomatic corps, consular corps, international organizations, temporary registrations, and tourist transportation.

Image	Issued	Design	Slogan	Serial format	Serials issued	Notes
	1978-1980		None	A-1234		
	1981-1986		None	A-1234		
	1987-1988	Red serial number on gray background	None	A-1234		
	1989-1992	Black serial number on yell background	None	A-1234		The yellow background is extremely faded in this photo.
	1993-1997	Green serial number on white background	None	A-1234		
	1998-2002		None	A-1234		
	2003-2005	Blue serial number on white background; "Privé" on black band and flag at bottom	None	A-1234		
	2006-2013	Black serial number on white background; "HAÏTI" in light blue at top, department name at bottom on black stripe; pink country image behind serial number	None	AA-1234		Only a single plate was issued for the rear of the vehicle.
	2014-Present		La perle des Antilles	AA-1234		Plates are issued in pairs again.

== Diplomatic and International Organization plates ==
Image	Issued	Design	Slogan	Serial format	Serials issued	Notes
	1998	Red serial number on white background; "Org. Internationale" at bottom	None	0123		

== Location and Taxi plates ==
Location plates indicate a vehicle for hire, and taxi plates are issued to traditional taxi companies.

Image	Issued	Design	Slogan	Serial format	Serials issued	Notes
	1998	Red serial number on white background; "Taxi" in blue at bottom center"	None	AB 1234		
	2003-2005	Blue serial number on white background; "Location" in white on black band and flag at bottom	None	1234		

== Transport plates ==
Image	Issued	Design	Slogan	Serial format	Serials issued	Notes
	1995-1996	Green serial number on white background; "Transport" at bottom center	None	12345		
	2002	Red serial number on white background; "Transport" in blue at bottom center	None	AB 1234		
	2003-2005	Blue serial number on white background; "Transport Passagers" in white on black band and flag at bottom	None	AB 1234		
	2006-current	Black serial number on red gradient background; "Transport Passagers" beneath the serial number. Slogan at the bottom, and map in the background	La perle des Antilles	AB-01234		
