= American Association of Motor Vehicle Administrators =

Trade association

- Founded: 1933
- Website: Official website

The American Association of Motor Vehicle Administrators (AAMVA) is a 501(c)(3) nonprofit trade association based in Arlington, Virginia, that operates in the United States and Canada on behalf of motor vehicle licensing and registration agencies. The AAMVA is primarily involved with motor vehicle administration and law enforcement through production of guidelines, model legislation, and white paper reports which it disseminates to its members. The membership of the organization consists of what the AAMVA calls jurisdictional members, these being US states and Canadian territories. The association is composed of motor vehicle and law enforcement administrators and executives from all 50 states, the District of Columbia, and Canadian territories and provinces.

Although Canadian jurisdictions are members of AAMVA, Canada also has a distinctly separate but similar organization, the Canadian Council of Motor Transport Administrators (CCMTA), which more directly establishes governance of driver and vehicle matters for provinces and territories. At least two Mexican states have been AAMVA members at some time. The U.S. Virgin Islands are current members of AAMVA as well as the District of Columbia.

The association is divided into four separate regions, primarily by geography, encompassing all North American members. Each region holds annual meetings with the entire membership meeting once per year. Within the membership are committees and task forces which meet typically on a quarterly basis.

== Methodology ==
AAMVA facilitates communication and fosters standardization among member state and provincial jurisdictions concerning traffic safety, titling of motor vehicles, and licensing drivers. AAMVA represents its U.S. and Canadian membership by working collaboratively to support and improve motor vehicle administration, safety, identification security and law enforcement. AAMVA also communicates the consensus views of members to the public, state legislatures, Congress, and other organizations such as the American Trucking Association, the National Conference of State Legislatures, and the National Governors Organization.

Some of the items found in AAMVA's policy statements include:

1. states' participation in the proposed Driver License Agreement
2. passing laws against Radar/Laser Detectors and Jammers
3. regulating tinted windows
4. states issuing front/back license plates±

The AAMVA also publishes the technical standards for driver's licenses compliant with the Real ID Act including anti-counterfeiting measures and machine-readable technologies such as a PDF417 barcode on the reverse side. Many state issued driving permits and ID cards display small digits next to each data field, which is required by the American Association of Motor Vehicle Administrators’ design standard. The newest card design standard released is the 2025 AAMVA DL/ID Card Design Standard (CDS), which supersedes the 2020 standard. The AAMVA standard generally follows part 1 and part 2 of ISO/IEC 18013-1 (ISO compliant driving license).

The AAMVA also operates the Commercial Driver's License Information System (CDLIS), which is a system that enables jurisdictions to exchange commercial driver information, including out-of-state convictions, in accordance with the Commercial Motor Vehicle Safety Act and the Motor Carrier Safety Improvement Act. AAMVA also supports the Problem Driver Pointer System, which is a system that enables jurisdictions to report serious convictions and withdrawals of drivers to the National Driver Register operated by the National Highway Traffic Safety Administration.

AAMVA also oversees the International Registration Plan. They provide staff support to the Joint Executive Board for the Driver License Compact and Non-Resident Violator Compact and the Driver License Agreement.

AAMVA also maintains the National Motor Vehicle Title Information System (NMVTIS) which enables vehicle titling agencies to verify the information on a title with the issuing state's electronic records in order to reduce vehicle theft and fraud. The Anti Car Theft Act of 1992 specified that the information within NMVTIS be available to federal, state, and local law enforcement officials, insurance carriers, and other prospective purchasers (e.g., individuals, auction companies, and used car dealers). By making this information available across jurisdictions, forms of title fraud such as "title washing" are reduced. Title washing occurs when the condition of a vehicle due to flood, junk, or salvage (known as a "brand"), as previously documented by a state, is lost when the title travels to another state putting an unsuspecting buyer at risk of paying more than a vehicle is worth or operating a vehicle inadequately repaired and potentially unsafe to drive.

== History ==
The organization came into existence in 1933 with the idea of standardizing driver's licensing and traffic laws. In more recent years, AAMVA has pushed very hard for the one driver, one license, one record concept as found in the Driver License Compact and the newly created Driver License Agreement, especially since the events of September 11, 2001.

=== Meetings ===
Each year, the administration holds a meeting somewhere in the U.S., with the state hosting making special license plates for all attendees.
