= National Driver Register =

U.S. drivers database

The National Driver Register (NDR) is a computerized database of information about United States drivers who have had their driver's licenses revoked or suspended, or who have been convicted of serious traffic violations, such as driving under the influence or drugs or alcohol (see 23 Code of Federal Regulations 1327 Appendix A for a complete list of violations). The records are added and maintained and deleted by the motor vehicle agency (MVA) of the state that convicted the driver or withdrew the driver's license.

== Checks for problem drivers ==
When a person applies for a driver's license, either as a new applicant or as a renewing applicant in a participating state, the state MVA must check if the name is on the NDR's Problem Driver Pointer System (PDPS) (as required by federal regulation—see 23 CFR 1327.5(b)(1)). If a person has been reported to the NDR by any state as a "problem driver", the prospective licensing state must investigate the driver's history from the state that added the NDR record. Depending on the results of the investigation and the state's own laws, the prospective licensing state may be required to deny the license. Thus, this "PDPS check" enables the state MVAs to prevent someone with a suspended or revoked driver's license in one state from obtaining a driver's license in another state. On March, 29th, 2021 the California DMV declined to renew a California DL for a California resident of 32 years based upon an NDR PDPS flag created by the state of MA for a $50 parking ticket levied in 1989 and a $40 late fee. A driver in Washington State nearly had their license revoked due to a PDPS flag created by the Ohio BMV for an unpaid $24 fee from 1998. The Ohio BMV generated a new Ohio DL for the Washington resident in order to suspend it and report it to the NDR. The PDPS check also makes it harder for a person to obtain more than one driver's license at any one time. Not all records on the NDR are correct. Some may have been added in the past incorrectly for misdemeanor violations, such as not returning license plates in New York state. Some records may identify the wrong driver. Some records for specific convictions may have met data retention requirements and are eligible for deletion. A driver must contact the state that added the record to have that state delete an incorrect record. To find out if you have a record on NDR PDPS, see the next section. The NDR may not contain all required records. For example, a man in Pennsylvania was convicted of driving under the influence of marijuana cigarettes and crack cocaine in 1997, and was never put on the NDR.

== Participation by states ==
Currently, and for the past few decades, all U.S. states participate in NDR, to avoid losing federal funding. Federal Regulation 23 CFR 1327.1 states, "This part provides procedures for States to participate in the National Driver Register (NDR) Problem Driver Pointer System (PDPS) and for other authorized parties to receive information from the NDR. It includes, in accordance with section 204(c) of the NDR Act of 1982 (Pub. L. 97-364), procedures for a State to notify the Secretary of Transportation of its intention to be bound by the requirements of section 205 of the Act (i.e., requirements for reporting by chief driver licensing officials) and for a State to notify the Secretary in the event it becomes necessary to withdraw from participation. The rule also contains the conditions for becoming a participating State as well as conditions and procedures for other authorized users of the NDR."

== Obtaining information from NDR ==
The following groups are authorized to receive information from the NDR:

- Individuals requesting their own records under the Privacy Act of 1974
- State and federal driver's licensing officials
- Federal Railroad Administration and employers of locomotive operators
- Federal Aviation Administration for airman medical certification
- United States Coast Guard for merchant mariner certification
- National Transportation Safety Board for accident investigations
- Federal Highway Administration for accident investigations
- Federal agencies performing background investigations for employment
- Current or prospective employers of commercial motor vehicles operators, with permission by the operator
- Air carriers for pilot applicants, with permission by the applicant

=== Requesting your record ===
Under the provisions of the Privacy Act of 1974 and Title 23 § 1327.7, you are entitled to request a file search to see if you have a record on the NDR. As a private citizen, you must send a notarized letter commonly referred to as a "privacy act request" to the NDR indicating that you would like an NDR file check. There is no charge for this service. See the NDR Frequently Asked Questions. A request (the service is free of charge) must be made in writing, via notarized letter and mailed to the address below.

National Driver Register

1200 New Jersey Avenue, S.E.

NVS-422

Washington, D.C. 20590

Include in your request:

- Your Full Legal Name
- Date of Birth
- State and Driver License Number*
- Social Security Number*
- Gender*
- Height*
- Weight*
- Eye Color*

*Optional PII helps eliminate you from other possible matches.

=== Identity data sharing ===
According to National Drivers Register officials, problem drivers' records posted to the NDR database by the states are made available to all states in the U.S. Information supplied by one state to the NDR is obtained by another state from the NDR using the first four letters of the driver's first and last names, date of birth, and, often, if it is published, that driver's social security number and/or license number.

== See also ==
- Driver License Compact
- Non-Resident Violator Compact
- Driver License Agreement
- Criminal record
