= United States commercial driver's license training =

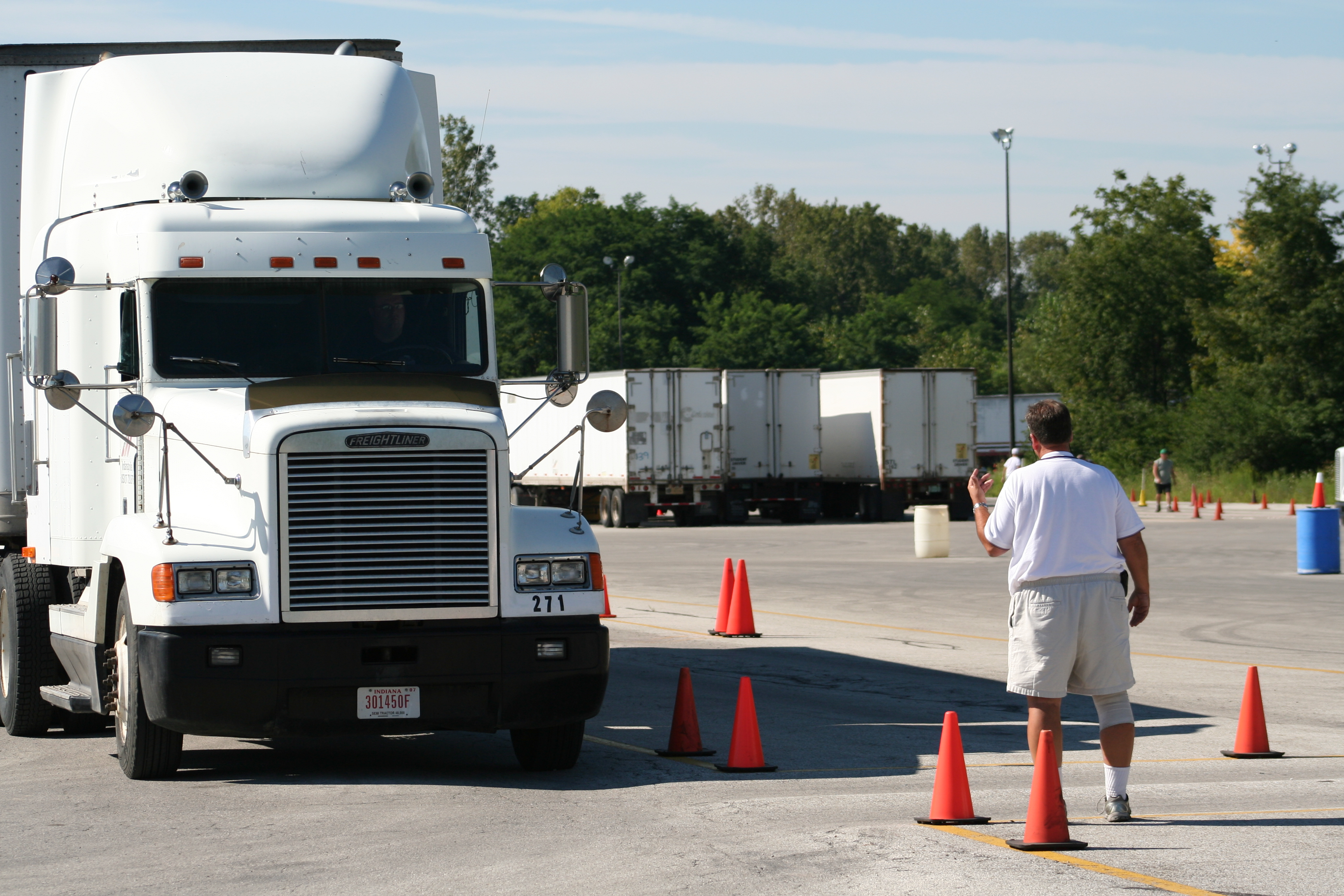
A CDL training truck on the range

Commercial driver's license training (or CDL training) is a specialized instructional program or course designed to prepare a student to obtain a commercial driver's license (CDL), which is required for a career as a truck driver in the United States. During training, students are taught the necessary knowledge and skills to pass a series of tests to obtain their CDL. Such a program generally begins with classroom instruction geared towards passing the written exams for a CDL permit, a learner's permit that allows a student to practice driving skills on public roads with a CDL licensed driver or instructor. Students graduate from CDL training upon receiving their CDLs and proving that they can comfortably and safely drive and maneuver a truck. Most CDL training schools train drivers for a class A CDL, which allows the holder to drive a tractor trailer weighing over 26,000 pounds.

Although rules and regulations governing the operation of CMVs and CDL licensing requirements are set and enforced by FMCSA (the Federal Motor Carrier Safety Administration, a part of the Department of Transportation (DoT)), the CDL itself is issued by the driver's home state. It is not legal to hold CDLs from more than one State. The minimum age for intrastate CDL is 18 years while for inter-state CDL is 21 years. There are different classes of CDL and endorsements along with it which are required to operate special types of vehicles.

There are three basic types of truck driving schools: programs offered through community colleges, private truck driving schools and schools operated by trucking companies. Each type of program has different characteristics, so prospective students need to evaluate which type of school is right for them. The length of CDL training programs varies from school to school. Programs can range from a few weeks up to six months to complete, depending on whether the program is part-time or full-time.

Each type of school can have advantages and disadvantages; for example, community college programs are often less expensive than private schools, but the private schools may offer faster completion with more flexibility in enrollment schedules. Community colleges may also offer more advanced facilities since campuses are developed and supported by the state in most cases.

Private truck driving schools are in business to provide training, so they are often "results-oriented." Most private truck driving schools offer financial aid and job placement assistance. Some private schools work only with certain employers and provide training on behalf of those employers. This is known as "sponsored" or "contract" training. In this situation, some or all of the up-front costs of training are paid to the school by the employer, and the student reimburses the employer during a period of employment as a driver. This may be an option for students who wish to avoid up-front payment, but students should understand the legal and financial implications of this type of training. As with all financial commitments for CDL training schools, potential students should inquire about tuition and fees, loans, credit checks, and other terms and conditions that apply to attending any truck driving school.

Schools operated by trucking companies can allow students to learn to drive with lower up-front costs, but there are conditions and obligations that go along with this arrangement. These programs are usually quicker than both private schools and community colleges (2–4 weeks). Drivers usually agree to drive for the carrier for at least a year in exchange for the training, and there can be tuition reimbursement costs and penalties for drivers who fail to complete this legal obligation. One advantage is that usually employment with the carrier that operates the school is guaranteed (as long as the student obtains a CDL and meets all hiring requirements upon completion of the training).

== Types of training courses ==
CDL training programs have three basic types of approval categories: licensed, certified, or accredited. Licensed schools have been reviewed by a state agency and have met the state's minimum school requirements (such as facilities, curriculum, instructors, financial, etc.). The school is regulated and licensed by the state agency, and must meet those requirements. Certified schools have been reviewed and inspected by a third party, usually an independent group that measures the school against industry standards. Graduates are expected to meet the minimum skills and knowledge standards for both the U.S. Department of Transportation and the trucking industry. Accreditation is an approval process conducted by an accrediting agency that has been authorized by the U.S. Department of Education to accredit schools that meet certain federal standards. There are only a handful of accredited CDL training programs in the United States. About 214,500 openings for heavy and tractor-trailer truck drivers are projected each year. Trucking companies use these three categories to determine which schools they will hire.
