= Commercial driver's license =

License to operate large or heavy vehicles

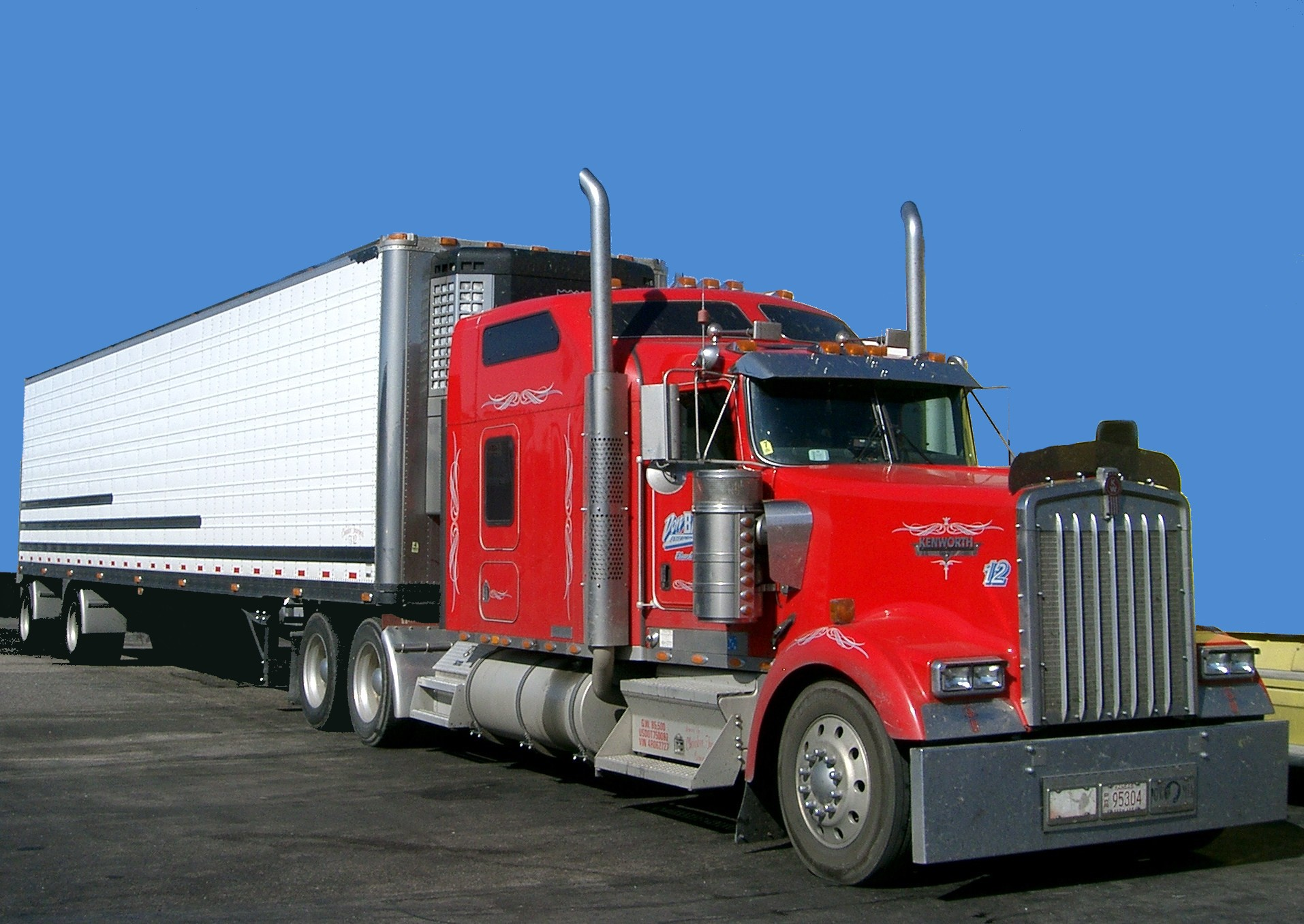
A commercial driver's license is required to operate a tractor-trailer for commercial use.

A commercial driver's license (CDL) is a driver's license required under 49 CFR Parts 300-399 in the United States to operate large and heavy vehicles (including trucks, buses, and trailers) or a vehicle of any size that transports hazardous materials or more than 16 passengers (driver included).

== United States ==
In the United States, the Commercial Motor Vehicle Safety Act of 1986 established minimum requirements that must be met when a state issues a CDL. While recreational vehicles and farm vehicles are federally exempt from requiring a CDL, federal law allows states to require a CDL for these vehicles. The following types of CDL licenses are:

- Class A – Any single vehicle, class 7 or 8, that has a gross vehicle weight rating exceeding 26,001 pounds (11,794 kilograms) or a vehicle combined with a towed unit(s)/trailer with a gross vehicle weight rating of more than 10,000 pounds (4,536 kilograms) that exceeds 26,001 pounds (11,794 kilograms).
- Class B – Any single vehicle class which has a gross vehicle weight rating less than 26,001 pounds (11,794 kilograms) and is towing a towed unit(s)/trailer with a gross vehicle weight rating that exceeds 10,000 pounds (4,536 kilograms).
- Class C – Any single vehicle, or combination of vehicles, that does not meet the definition of Class A or Class B, but is either designed to transport 16 or more passengers, including the driver or is transporting material that has been designated as hazardous under 49 U.S.C. 5103 and is required to be placarded under subpart F of 49 CFR Part 172 or is transporting any quantity of a material listed as a select agent or toxin in 42 CFR Part 73.

=== Age requirements ===
State governments determine the minimum age for issuing a CDL. All states, as well as the District of Columbia, have made 18 the minimum age for a CDL to be issued with the exception of Hawaii where the minimum age is 21.

The Federal Motor Carrier Safety Administration (FMCSA) which oversees the Commercial Motor Vehicle Safety Act of 1986 requires drivers to be 21 years or over to drive a commercial vehicle in interstate commerce (to move goods across state lines) or to transport hazardous materials when placards are required. The FMCSA allows states to issue a CDL to drivers under 21 providing they only drive a commercial vehicle within the state where the CDL was issued, i.e. intrastate commerce. Additional age restrictions vary by state law. For example, New Jersey requires drivers to be at least 21 years of age for a passenger endorsement.

On 15 November 2021, New York Governor Kathy Hochul signed legislation to lower the minimum age for a CDL Class A from 21 to 18. Previously, New York State only allowed 18 to 20-year-olds to apply for a CDL Class B or C, but not for a CDL Class A until they turn 21.

The Infrastructure Investment and Jobs Act signed into law on 15 November 2021 by President Joe Biden established the "safe driver apprenticeship pilot program" that would allow qualified 18 to 20-year-olds with a CDL to operate in interstate commerce after successful completion of two training phases(totaling 400 hours on-duty with at least with 240 hours supervised by an older and experienced driver). This program aims to help alleviate the national truck driver shortage by removing the barrier for 18, 19, and 20-year-olds to become professional bus and truck drivers by exempting them from the age requirement for interstate commerce provided they meet all other requirements as drivers age 21 and over.

=== Regulation changes ===
Before 1992, driving commercial motor vehicles (CMVs), which are primarily tractor-trailers (or Longer Combination Vehicles (LCVs)), required advanced skills and knowledge above and beyond those required to drive a car or other lightweight vehicle. Before the implementation of the commercial driver's license (CDL) in 1992, licensing requirements for driving larger vehicles and buses varied from state to state.

This lack of training resulted in a large number of preventable traffic deaths and accidents.

In 1992, when the Commercial Motor Vehicle Safety Act of 1986 became law, all drivers were required to have a CDL in order to drive a Commercial Motor Vehicle which meets one of the classes listed above. The Federal Highway Administration (FHWA) has developed testing standards for licensing drivers. U.S. states are able to issue CDLs only after a written and practical test have been given by the State or approved testing facility.

A state may also require a driver to have a CDL to operate certain other vehicles not meeting the federal classes listed above. For example, a driver licensed in New Jersey must have a CDL to drive a bus, limousine, or van that is used for hire and designed to transport 8 to 15 passengers. A driver licensed in New York must have a CDL to legally transport passengers in school buses and other vehicles listed in Article 19-A of the state's Vehicle and Traffic Law. Drivers licensed in California must have a CDL if their primary employment is driving, whether or not they actually drive a commercial vehicle. California defines a commercial vehicle as one that transports for hire either people or products. In addition, possession of a CDL in California changes the threshold for a Driving Under the Influence citation from 0.08% to 0.04% blood alcohol content.

Prospective licensees should verify CDL requirements by referencing their state specific CDL Manual.

In most states, a driver's license (for cars) is required before a Commercial Driver's License can be issued.

=== Endorsements ===
The following endorsements listed are federal-level endorsements. States are free to enact endorsements at the state level. For example, in New York State, a W endorsement is required to operate a tow truck.

| Endorsement | Letter | Required Test(s) | Class A? | Class B? | Class C? | Notes |
|---|---|---|---|---|---|---|
| Doubles and triples | T | Knowledge Test | Yes | No | No | Required to pull two or three trailers. Only 14 states allow triple trailers (three cargos) to be driven, including Alaska, Arizona, Colorado, Idaho, Indiana, Kansas, Montana, Nebraska, Nevada, North Dakota, Oklahoma, Oregon, South Dakota, Ohio and Utah. In all other states, only two trailers can be hauled thus triples are not permitted. Furthermore, STAA doubles are permitted in all 50 states; Alaska allows triple 53' trailers, Kansas and Oklahoma allow turnpike doubles (double 48' trailers) other combinations are restricted in various states. |
| Passenger vehicle | P | Knowledge and Skills Test | Yes | Yes | Yes | Required to drive a bus or any vehicle that will transport 16 or more passengers. In most states, a CDL is not required if the driver will only transport family members for non-commercial purposes unless the vehicle weighs more than 26,000 pounds GVWR. |
| School bus | S | Knowledge and Skills Test | Yes | Yes | Yes | Required to drive a school bus and/or to transport school students to or from school. A passenger endorsement is required for this endorsement. |
| Tank vehicle | N | Knowledge Test | Yes | Yes | Yes | Required to drive a container that carries 1,000 pounds (450 kg) or more of liquid. |
| Hazardous materials | H | Knowledge Test | Yes | Yes | Yes | Required to transport hazardous materials in commerce. This endorsement, by federal law, requires the driver to be at least 21 years of age, pass a medical background test, pass a TSA background test, and be fingerprinted for any prior criminal conviction. |
| Combination of tank vehicle and hazardous material. | X | Knowledge Tests | Yes | Yes | Yes | A combination of H and N endorsements that replaces them. |

=== Endorsements without codes ===
These are optional endorsements that do not carry an endorsement code, but may be required for certain CDL holders:

| Endorsement | Required for | Restriction (if not passed) |
|---|---|---|
| Air brakes | Any commercial motor vehicle with air brakes. | The CDL Holder will be issued an L on their restrictions, indicating they are forbidden from operating any commercial motor vehicle equipped with air brakes. |
| Combination vehicles | Any combination vehicles. This endorsement is mandatory for all Class A applicants. | Ineligible for the Class A CDL. Though, applicants may still apply for a Class B or Class C CDL without this endorsement. |

=== Restrictions ===
| Restriction Code | Description |
|---|---|
| E | No manual transmission CMV |
| K | Intrastate commerce only |
| L | No operation of air brake CMV |
| M | No class A passenger bus |
| N | No class A or B passenger bus |
| O | No tractor trailer with fifth wheel CMV |
| V | Medical variance |
| X | No cargo in CM tank vehicle |
| Y | Heating aid required |
| Z | No full air brake |

E, K, L, M, N, O, V and Z are federal restrictions. Any other restrictions have been promulgated at the state level.

=== Training ===
Educational prerequisites vary by state. Some states, such as Ohio, for example require 160 hours of classroom and on the road training. Training may be obtained by completing a qualified CDL training program through a DMV-approved truck driving school. These training programs specialize in teaching potential truck drivers the necessary skills and knowledge to properly and safely operate a truck, including map reading, trip planning, and compliance with U.S. Department of Transportation laws, as well as backing, turning, hooking a trailer, and road driving. The overall purpose of these training schools is to help truckers-to-be pass the CDL knowledge and skills tests as well as advanced driving techniques such as skid avoidance and recovery and other emergency actions for situations such as a breakaway trailer and hydroplaning. These classes usually go well beyond the training the typical non-commercial driver receives, such as the driver's education provided in high school. There are a number of licensed CDL training schools around the United States and many trucking companies operate their own schools as well.

=== Testing ===
Although each state may add additional restrictions, there are national requirements which are as follows. A prospective driver must pass a series of written exams for a learner permit, or to add endorsements. The General Knowledge Test, required for a commercial learner permit, consists of 50 questions, where 80 percent of questions must be answered correctly to pass.

The CDL Skills Test must be passed for the applicant to obtain their CDL license. It includes three different sections:

1. The first is the Pre-Trip Inspection where the applicant must inspect their vehicle and describe what they would inspect and why.
2. The second is a written test on highway safety and a test about different parts of a truck with a minimum of 30 questions on the test. To pass this knowledge test, student drivers must answer at least 80 percent of the questions correctly.
3. The third is a driving skills test. To pass the driving skills test, the student driver must successfully perform a set of required driving maneuvers. The driving skill test must be taken in a vehicle that the driver operates or expects to operate. For certain endorsements, such as air (pneumatic) brakes, the driving skills test must be taken in a vehicle equipped with such equipment. If the test is done in a vehicle equipped with an automatic transmission, a restriction of E will be placed on the license prohibiting the driver from operating a vehicle with a manual transmission. The student driver also needs to show they do in fact show the characteristics of an aware and fully operative driver. This does not exclude certain disabilities; however, standard requirements required by the safety operators must be met.

Employers, training facilities, states, governmental departments, and private institutions may be permitted to administer knowledge and driving test for the state. The test must be the same as those given by the state issuing the CDL, and the instructors must meet the same professional certification as state instructors.

States are required to conduct an inspection of any testing facility and evaluates the programs by taking an actual test as if they were testing driver at least once a year, or by taking a sample of drivers tested by the third party and then comparing pass/fail rates.

In addition, the state's agreement with the third party testing centers must allow the FMCSA and the State to conduct random examinations, inspections, and audits without notice.

=== Medical certification ===
In 2014, the law regarding drivers in pursuit of a CDL was modified and now requires a DOT medical examiner to authorize a person with a medical issue to be able to drive. Prior to the change, a private doctor was able to authorize a driver to obtain a CDL. Most CMV drivers must prove they are healthy enough to safely drive a truck. A valid medical certificate must be filled out by a medical professional listed on the National Registry of Certified Medical Examiners at the conclusion of an extensive physical exam, with a copy provided to the state Bureau (or Department) of Motor Vehicles compliance unit. Some examples of an impairment which disqualifies a driver include the inability to grasp a steering wheel or operate foot pedals, insulin use, certain cardiac and respiratory problems, markedly elevated blood pressure, epilepsy, some severe psychiatric disorders, certain color blindness, poor corrected vision in either eye (worse than 20/40), bilateral hearing loss, active alcoholism, and other conditions which significantly increase the risk of a medical emergency behind the wheel.

Not all medical providers are able to test and complete the medical certification form.

=== Contents ===
A CDL must contain the following information:
- (a)(1) The prominent statement that the license is a "commercial driver's license" or "CDL," except as specified in §383.153(b);
- (a)(2) The full name, signature, and mailing address of the person to whom such license is issued;
- (a)(3) Physical and other information to identify and describe such person including date of birth (month, day, and year), sex, and height;
- (a)(4) Color photograph of the driver;
- (a)(5) The driver's State license number;
- (a)(6) The name of the State which issued the license;
- (a)(7) The date of issuance and the date of expiration of the license;
- (a)(8) The group or groups of commercial motor vehicle(s) that the driver is authorized to operate, indicated as follows:
- (a)(8)(i) A for Combination Vehicle;
- (a)(8)(ii) B for Heavy Straight Vehicle; and
- (a)(8)(iii) C for Small Vehicle.
- (a)(9) The endorsement(s) for which the driver has qualified, if any, indicated as follows:
- (a)(9)(i) T for double/triple trailers;
- (a)(9)(ii) P for passenger;
- (a)(9)(iii) N for tank vehicle;
- (a)(9)(iv) H for hazardous materials (which includes most all fireworks);
- (a)(9)(v) X for a combination of the tank vehicle and hazardous materials endorsements;
- (a)(9)(vi) S for school bus; and
- (a)(9)(vii) At the discretion of the State, additional codes for additional groupings of endorsements, as long as each such discretionary code is fully explained on the front or back of the CDL document.
- (b) If the CDL is a nonresident CDL, it shall contain the prominent statement that the license is a "nonresident commercial driver's license" or "nonresident CDL." The word "nonresident" must be conspicuously and unmistakably displayed, but may be noncontiguous with the words "Commercial Driver's License" or "CDL."
- (c) If the State has issued the applicant an air (pneumatic) brake restriction as specified in §383.95, that restriction must be indicated on the license.

=== CDLIS Clearinghouse ===
The Commercial Driver's License Information System (CDLIS) and the National Driver Register (NDR) exchange information on traffic convictions and driver disqualifications of commercial drivers. States have to use both CDLIS and NDR to check a driver's record before a CDL can be issued. Trucking companies can use a commercial service that has clearance for providing this information as a means of screening prospective employees.

=== Convictions ===
- Driving without a CDL, or suspended CDL, incurs a civil penalty of up to $2,500 or, in aggravated cases, criminal penalties of up to $5,000 in fines and/or up to 90 days in prison.
- A conviction for driving while using an electronic device incurs a $2750 fine for the driver and a $11,000 fine for the employer.
- An employer is also subject to a penalty of up to $10,000 if they knowingly permit a driver to operate a CMV without a valid CDL.
- Two or more serious traffic violations, including excessive speeding, reckless driving, improper or erratic lane changes, following the vehicle ahead too closely, and traffic offenses in connection with fatal traffic accidents, within a three-year period: a 90-day to five-year suspension.
- One or more violations of a Motor vehicle declared out of service order within a 10-year period: one-year suspension.
- Driving under the influence of a controlled substance or alcohol, or leaving the scene of an accident, or using a CMV to commit a felony: three-year suspension.
- Any of the one-year offenses while operating a CMV for hazardous materials or second offense of any of the one-year or three-year offenses, or using a CMV to commit a felony involving manufacturing, distributing, or dispensing controlled substances: life suspension.

States can reduce certain lifetime disqualifications to a minimum disqualification period of 10 years if the driver completes a driver rehabilitation program approved by the State. Not all states do this: it is available in Idaho and New York State but not California or New Jersey.

If a CDL holder is disqualified from operating a CMV they cannot be issued a "conditional" or "hardship" CDL, but can continue to drive non-commercial vehicles.

Any convictions are reported to the driver's home State and Federal Highway Administration and these convictions are treated the same as convictions for violations that are committed in the home State.

The Commercial Drivers License Program collects and stores all convictions a driver receives and transmits this data to the home State so that any disqualification or suspension can be applied.

The FHWA has established 0.04% as the blood alcohol concentration (BAC) level at or above which a CMV driver is deemed to be driving under the influence of alcohol and subject to lose his/her CDL. Additionally, an operator of a CMV that is found to have 'any detectable amount of BAC above 0.0%' will be put out of service for a minimum of 24 hours.

A driver must report any driving conviction within 30 days, except parking, to their employer regardless of the nature of the violation.

Employers must be notified if a driver's license is suspended, revoked, or canceled. The notification must be made by the end of the next business day following receipt of the notice of the suspension, revocation, cancellation, lost privilege or disqualification.

Employers cannot under any circumstances use a driver who has more than one license or whose license is suspended, revoked or canceled, or is disqualified from driving. Violation of this requirement may result in civil or criminal penalties.

=== Occupational outlook ===
The Bureau of Labor Statistics projects a 2% employment growth rate in Heavy and Tractor-trailer Trucking from 2019 to 2029, slower than the average growth rate of 4% across all professions. Scholarships are being awarded to military veterans at CDL-A schools and truck driving companies.

== United Kingdom ==
In the United Kingdom the PCV Licence (PCV stands for Passenger Carrying Vehicle) enables the holder to drive buses and/or minibuses, subject to what kind of Practical Driving Test the licence holder passes.

- Category C+E Vehicles over 3,500 kilograms (7,700 lb) with a trailer over 750 kilograms (1,650 lb), also known as Large Goods Vehicle, normal max gross weight 44,000 kilograms (97,000 lb): minimum age 21. 17 if in the Armed Forces and now 18 if the driver meets certain requirements regarding CPC (Certificate of Professional Competence).
- Category D1 allows the holder to drive a vehicle with between nine and sixteen passenger seats with a trailer up to 750 kilograms (1,650 lb) maximum authorised mass.
- Category D1+E allows the holder to drive a vehicle with between nine and sixteen passenger seats with a trailer over 750 kilograms (1,650 lb) maximum authorised mass, provided that the maximum authorised mass of the trailer does not exceed the unladen mass of the vehicle being driven and the combined maximum authorised mass of both the vehicle and trailer does not exceed 12,000 kilograms (26,000 lb).
  - For example, a vehicle with an unladen mass of 2,650 kilograms (5,840 lb) and a MAM of 4,005 kilograms (8,830 lb), with a trailer MAM of 2,200 kilograms (4,900 lb) will give a combined MAM of 6,205 kilograms (13,680 lb) – and the unladen mass of the vehicle being driven (2,650 kilograms (5,840 lb)) is greater than the MAM of the trailer (2,200 kilograms (4,900 lb)) so is acceptable. However, a vehicle with an unladen mass of 2,650 kilograms (5,840 lb) and a MAM of 4,005 kilograms (8,830 lb), with a trailer MAM of 2,700 kilograms (6,000 lb) will give a combined MAM of 6,705 kilograms (14,782 lb) – but because the MAM of the trailer (2,700 kilograms (6,000 lb)) exceeds the unladen weight of the vehicle being driven (2,650 kilograms (5,840 lb)), a Category D+E licence is needed to drive that vehicle.
- Category D allows the holder to drive a vehicle with more than eight passenger seats with a trailer up to 750 kilograms (1,650 lb) maximum authorised mass.
- Category D+E allows the holder to drive a vehicle with more than eight passenger seats with a trailer over 750 kilograms (1,650 lb) maximum authorised mass.

== India ==
In India, commercial drivers must obtain a Commercial Driving License (CDL) issued by the Regional Transport Office (RTO). The process generally includes:

1. Eligibility: Applicants must be at least 18 years old and hold a valid non-commercial driving license for a minimum period, usually a year.
2. Medical Fitness: Applicants must undergo a medical fitness examination to ensure they meet health standards necessary for commercial driving.
3. Knowledge Test: A written test covering traffic rules, road signs, and vehicle operation must be passed.
4. Skills Test: A practical driving test evaluates the applicant's ability to operate a commercial vehicle safely under various road and traffic conditions.
5. Endorsements: Additional endorsements may be required for specific vehicle types or hazardous materials transport.
6. Application and Issuance: Successful applicants receive a CDL issued by the RTO, specifying the types of vehicles they are authorised to drive and any endorsements held.

Regulatory Framework

Countries regulate commercial driving licenses to ensure safety, efficiency, and compliance with national and international transport standards. Licensing requirements may include age restrictions, medical examinations, knowledge and skills testing, and ongoing professional development to enhance driver competence and road safety.

== Australia ==
All places in Australia have a mostly similar driver licence system, although some things can change in each state or territory (e.g. what classes of license are available).

=== Australian license classes ===
- C Car: A 'Class C' licence covers vehicles up to 4.5 tonnes (4.4 long tons; 5.0 short tons) gross vehicle mass (GVM)

GVM is the maximum recommended weight a vehicle can be when loaded. A 'Class C' Licence allows the holder to drive cars, utilities, vans, some light trucks, car-based motor tricycles, tractors and implements such as graders. You can also drive vehicles that seat up to 12 adults, including the driver.

- R Rider: Motorcycle riders require a 'Class R' licence.
- LR Light Rigid: 'Class LR' covers a rigid vehicle with a GVM of more than 4.5 tonnes (4.4 long tons; 5.0 short tons) but not more than 8 tonnes (7.9 long tons; 8.8 short tons). Any towed trailer must not weigh more than 9 tonnes (8.9 long tons; 9.9 short tons) GVM. This class also includes vehicles with a GVM up to 8 tonnes (7.9 long tons; 8.8 short tons) which carry more than 12 adults including the driver and vehicles in class 'C'.
- MR Medium Rigid: 'Class MR' covers a rigid vehicle with 2 axles and a GVM of more than 8 tonnes (7.9 long tons; 8.8 short tons). Any towed trailer must not weigh more than 9 tonnes (8.9 long tons; 9.9 short tons) GVM. This class also includes vehicles in class 'LR'.
- HR Heavy Rigid: 'Class HR' covers a rigid vehicle with 3 or more axles and a GVM of more than 8 tonnes (7.9 long tons; 8.8 short tons). Any towed trailer must not weigh more than 9 tonnes (8.9 long tons; 9.9 short tons) GVM. This class also includes articulated buses and vehicles in class 'MR'.
- HC Heavy Combination: This licence covers heavy combination vehicles like a prime mover towing a semi-trailer, or rigid vehicles towing a trailer with a GVM of more than 9 tonnes (8.9 long tons; 9.9 short tons). This class also includes vehicles in class 'HR'.
- MC Multi-Combination: This licence covers multi-combination vehicles like Road Trains and B-Double Vehicles. It also includes vehicles in class 'HC'.

=== Medical standards ===
The medical standards for drivers of commercial vehicles are set by the National Transport Commission and Austroads, and are set out in 'Assessing Fitness to Drive' (available from the Austroads website).

For those applying for heavy vehicle licence classes MR (Medium Rigid), HR (Heavy Rigid), HC (Heavy Combination) or MC (Multi Combination), it is strongly recommended that the applicant ensures they meet the medical requirements before commencing any training or tests for a heavy vehicle licence.

=== Paying passengers ===
The driver of a vehicle carrying paying passengers (such as a school bus or tourist coach) requires an appropriate driver licence and a 'Public Passenger Vehicle Driver Authority' which is issued by the Ministry of Transport.

== New Zealand ==
In New Zealand, driver licensing is controlled by the NZ Transport Agency. There are six classes of motor-vehicle licence and nine licence endorsements. Class 1 governs vehicles with a GLW (gross laden weight) or GCW (gross combined weight) of less than 6,000 kg, and Class 6 governs motorcycles. Classes 2–5 govern heavy vehicles.

A Class 2 licence allows the holder to drive:

- any rigid vehicle (including any tractor) with a GLW of more than 6,000 kilograms (13,000 lb) but less than 18,001 kilograms (39,685 lb)
- any combination vehicle with a GCW of 12,000 kilograms (26,000 lb) or less
- any combination vehicle consisting of a rigid vehicle with a GLW of 18,000 kilograms (40,000 lb) or less towing a light trailer (GLW of 3,500 kilograms (7,700 lb) or less)
- any rigid vehicle with a GLW of more than 18,000 kilograms (40,000 lb) that has no more than two axles
- any vehicle covered in Class 1.

Class 3 allows the holder to drive:

- any combination vehicle with a GCW of more than 12,000 kilograms (26,000 lb) but less than 25,001 kilograms (55,118 lb)
- any vehicle covered in classes 1 and 2.

Class 4 allows the holder to drive:

- any rigid vehicle (including any tractor) with a GLW of more than 18,000 kilograms (40,000 lb)
- any combination vehicle consisting of a rigid vehicle with a GLW of more than 18,000 kilograms (40,000 lb) towing a light trailer (GLW of 3,500 kilograms (7,700 lb) or less)
- vehicles covered in classes 1 and 2, but not Class 3.

Class 5 allows the holder to drive:

- any combination vehicle with a GCW of more than 25,000 kilograms (55,000 lb)
- vehicles covered by classes 1, 2, 3 and 4.

Before getting a Class 2 licence, a driver must be at least 18 years of age and have held an unrestricted Class 1 licence for at least six months. Gaining a Class 5 is not dependent on holding a Class 3. Once a driver has a Class 2 they can progress straight through to Class 4 and Class 5. Each progression (2 to 3, 2 to 4, or 4 to 5) requires having held an unrestricted licence of the preceding class for at least six months. For drivers aged 25 or over the minimum period for holding the unrestricted time is reduced to three months, or waived entirely on completion of an approved course of instruction.

Additional endorsements on an NZ driver's licence govern provision of special commercial services. The endorsements are:

- D - Dangerous Goods: transporting hazardous substances. Must be renewed every five years
- F - Forklift operator
- I - Driving Instructor: An "I" endorsement is awarded for a specific Class of licence, e.g.: 5-I
- O - Testing Officer: Driving assessors who test a person prior to being granted a particular class of licence
- P - Passenger: Transport of fare-paying passengers (bus and taxi drivers, limo-for-hire drivers, and dial-a-driver services)
- R - Roller: Special vehicle equipped with rollers
- T - Tracks: Special vehicle equipped with tracks
- V - Vehicle recovery: Operating a tow truck
- W - Wheels: Special vehicle equipped with wheels, other than fire appliances, buses, tractors, vehicle-recovery vehicles, or trade vehicles.

The F, R, T and W endorsements are for operating special types of vehicle on the road. Where the holder also has a heavy vehicle (Class 2 or Class 4) licence, they are permitted to drive heavy special vehicles. Otherwise the limits for Class 1 (6,000 kilograms (13,000 lb)) apply.

Being granted an I, O, P and/or V endorsement requires that the applicant passes a "fit and proper person" check, to screen for people with criminal convictions or serious driving infringements. These endorsements are issued for one or five years, at the option of the applicant at the time of purchase.

== Hong Kong ==
In Hong Kong, Transport Department is responsible for issuing driver licences. Private light bus (class 4), public light bus (class 5), taxi (class 6), private bus (class 9), public bus (class 10), franchised public bus (class 17), medium goods vehicle (class 18), heavy goods vehicle (class 19), articulated vehicle (class 20) and special purpose vehicle (class 21) are vehicles requiring commercial driving licences., whereas private car (class 1), light goods vehicle (class 2), motorcycle (class 3), and motor tricycle (class 22) are considered non-commercial vehicles.

To apply for a commercial driving licence, a driver must: - be of age 21 or above; - have obtained a private car or light goods vehicle full driving licence for at least 3 years (2 years if converted from probationary licence) immediately before the application; - be a Hong Kong permanent resident or not subject to any condition of stay other than a limit of stay; - have not been convicted of some serious driving offences specified in law within 5 years before the application; and take a driving test of the class of vehicle the driver is going to apply.

In Hong Kong, driving licences are issued separately for each class of vehicle and printed on the licence, although passing a driving test of a heavier vehicle automatically gives the driver the right to apply for corresponding lighter vehicles:

- 6 (Taxi) — Only a written test has to be taken, including traffic regulations, taxi regulations and places.
- 4 (Private light bus), 5 (Public light bus) — Passenger vehicles with 8 to 19 seats. The driving tests for both are the same, but only class 4 (private light bus) licence can be applied after passing the test. In order to apply for a class 5 (public light bus) licence, a driver has to take an additional Pre-service Training Course for Public Light Bus Drivers before submitting the application
- 9 (Private bus), 10 (Public bus) — Passenger vehicles with 20 seats or more. The driving tests for both are the same, and class 4 (private light bus) licence is issued automatically at the same time when applying class 9, 10 licences after passing the test. In addition, class 5 (public light bus) licence can be applied after taking an additional Pre-service Training Course for Public Light Bus Drivers.
- 17 (Franchised public bus) — This is obtained through training within a franchised bus company, for example, Kowloon Motor Bus. The driving test requirement is the same with public bus (class 10), and is only retained with historical interest. A driver passing a test on a franchised bus will be issued classes 4, 9, 10 in addition to 17, and 5 after taking an additional Pre-service Training Course for Public Light Bus Drivers, enabling him/her to drive any public buses, whereas a driver holding class 10 (public bus) licence can also drive franchised public bus. Class 17 exists because the government had to protect the interests of franchised bus companies, in the past, drivers trained by a franchised bus company could only get a class 17 licence, enabling him/her to drive franchised public bus only but not other public buses. This has been relaxed such that a driver passing test on a franchised public bus can get classes 9, 10 in addition to class 17, and original drivers holding class 17 without classes 9, 10 can also apply them for free without taking tests.
- 18 (Medium goods vehicles) — Goods vehicles with maximum gross weight above 5.5 tonnes (5.4 long tons; 6.1 short tons) and not exceeding 24 tonnes (24 long tons; 26 short tons). Class 2 (light goods vehicles) licence is issued in addition to class 18 after passing the test.
- 19 (Heavy goods vehicles) — Goods vehicles with maximum gross weight above 24 tonnes (24 long tons; 26 short tons) and not exceeding 38 tonnes (37 long tons; 42 short tons). Class 2 (light goods vehicles) and class 18 (medium goods vehicles) licences are issued in addition to class 19 after passing the test.
- 20 (Articulated vehicle) — Usually refers to vehicle in the form of truck and trailer combination (hence articulated, but not include tow vehicle), total weight between 38 and 44 tonnes (37 and 43 long tons; 42 and 49 short tons). The driver has to obtain full licence of class 18 (medium goods vehicles) at least before applying. Class 19 (heavy goods vehicles) licence is issued in addition to class 20 after passing the test.
- 21 (Special purpose vehicle) — Includes street washing vehicles, arrow vehicles, road maintenance vehicles, ice cream vehicles, etc. A driver has to apply with endorsement from his/her company, and holding a full licence of class 2 (light goods vehicle), 18 (medium goods vehicles) or 19 (heavy goods vehicles). Class 21 licence has to be used in conjunction with a class 2, 18 or 19 licence, allowing the driver to drive special purpose vehicles with maximum gross vehicle weight up to the goods vehicle licence the driver holds.

== See also ==
- Commercial Driver's License Information System
- Truck classification
- Trucking industry in the United States
