= Driver License Compact =

American interstate compact to share data between states

The Driver License Compact is an agreement between states in the United States of America. The compact is used to exchange data between a motorist's home state and a state where the motorist incurred a vehicular violation. Not all states are members, and states respond to the data differently.

== Overview ==
The Driver License Compact, a framework setting out the basis of a series of laws within adopting states in the United States (as well as similar reciprocal agreements in adopting provinces of Canada), gives states a simple standard for reporting, tracking, and punishing traffic violations occurring outside of their state, without requiring individual treaties between every pair of states. Convictions and dispositions of driving violations are reported to a licensee's home state, which may take its own administrative actions. Pre-conviction reports may also be made for serious crimes. Out-of-state suspensions, revocations, or blocked renewals must also be honored by every state within the compact. A final provision ensures that no one can hold a license in two states by requiring the surrender of the old license.

== History ==
The Driver License Compact came into existence with Nevada becoming the first member in 1960. Organizations in the Western States, including governors, came together to collaborate on traffic safety. Under the Beamer Resolution ("Interstate Compacts for Highway Safety Resolution"), Public Law 85-684, enacted on August 20, 1958, 72 Stat. 635 (named for Rep. John V. Beamer, R-Indiana), states were automatically permitted to form compacts in the areas of traffic safety. Originally, the Driver's License Compact dealt with dangerous driving violations such as drunk driving, reckless driving, the commission of a felony involving a motor vehicle, and others. Later on, minor violations were included as well. 23 states joined during the 1960s, and the 1986-87 period saw 10 more states join; the rest trickled in until Pennsylvania became the last to join in 1996.

The Driver License Compact is no longer being pushed by the American Association of Motor Vehicle Administrators (AAMVA), as it has been superseded by the Driver License Agreement (DLA), which also replaces the Non-Resident Violator Compact. However, as of 2011, there were only three member states to the DLA: Arkansas, Connecticut, and Massachusetts.

== States that are not members ==
Some states such as Michigan, Wisconsin, and Georgia are not members. According to the American Association of Motor Vehicle Administrators, Nevada repealed the authorizing legislation in 2007, although it still generally conforms to the agreement through regulations.

== Exceptions ==
- Some states, such as Colorado, Maryland, Nevada, New York, and Pennsylvania, do not assess points for minor offenses and apply the DLC for only major violations.
- States that are members are free to take action on violations reported from a non-member state as well.
- Michigan Legislature passed in 2018 as House Bill 6011, which allows Michigan to enter into the compact. As of 2021, the Governor has not yet done so.
- Pennsylvania transfers points from another state within the agreement only if it meets certain conditions.
- New Jersey assigns two points for all out-of-state minor violations regardless of whether the point values are higher or lower if committed in the home state.

== Agreements between US states and Canadian provinces ==
Some US states share information and act on driving violations in certain Canadian provinces, in a similar way to the compact:

- New York does assess points for minor violations received in Ontario and Quebec.
- Michigan and Ontario exchange information and take adverse action.
- Maine and Quebec exchange information and take adverse action.
- British Columbia exchanges information with the majority of US states and has a reciprocity agreement with all of them. If the driver's home state shares information with BC, they need only surrender their US license and receive a new BC license, with no testing or restrictions. If the driver's home state does not share information with BC, they will be required to provide proof of a 2-year driving history from the state, or will be given a license with the province's new driver restrictions and a magnetic green "N" which must be affixed to the back of any vehicle they operate for the first 2 years.

== National Driver Register ==
The National Driver Register (NDR) is a computerized database of information on drivers whose licenses have been revoked or suspended, or who have been convicted of serious traffic violations, such as driving while impaired by alcohol or other drugs. State motor vehicle agencies provide NDR with the names of individuals who have lost their "privilege" or who have been convicted of a serious traffic violation. When a person applies for a driver's license, the state checks whether the name is on the NDR file. If a person has been reported to the NDR as a problem driver, the license may be denied.
