= Commercial Driver's License Information System =

Mandated by the Commercial Motor Vehicle Safety Act 1986 (CMVSA) and revised in accordance with various other federal laws subsequent to CMVSA, CDLIS helps document the issuance of a Commercial driver's license (CDL) and the withdrawal of a commercial driver by the State Driver Licensing Agencies (SDLAs) of the CDLIS jurisdictions (the 50 U.S. States and the District of Columbia). The purpose of CDLIS is to keep a record of each driver nationwide and help ensure only one driver license and one record for each driver and to enable authorized users nationwide, such as local law enforcement officials, to check whether a driver is withdrawn, through the cooperative exchange of commercial driver information between the CDLIS jurisdictions.

CDLIS has operated in all 51 CDLIS jurisdictions since April 1, 1992. As of February 25, 2013, CDLIS had 14.6 million driver records, growing at an average rate of nearly 40,000 new records per month.

== The System ==
CDLIS consists of a Central Site (located in Ashburn, Virginia) and nodes for all 51 SDLAs, all interconnected on AAMVAnet (AAMVA's proprietary, secure network). The Central Site stores identification data about each commercial driver registered in the jurisdictions, such as: name; date of birth; last five digits of the Social Security Number; State driver license number and Also Known As (AKA) information (i.e., former/previous names, DOBs, and/or State driver license numbers). The information at the Central Site constitutes a driver's unique CDLIS Master Pointer Record (MPR). The jurisdiction nodes store the Driver History Records (DHRs), which include driver identification information, license information, history of convictions, and history of withdrawals for each commercial driver licensed by the particular state.

When a jurisdiction SDLA queries the CDLIS Central Site via AAMVAnet to obtain information about an applicant prior to issuing a CDL, the CDLIS Central Site compares data provided by the State Of Inquiry (SOI) against all MPRs at the Central Site. If one or more matches are returned, then the CDLIS Central Site "points" the SOI to the State Of Record (SOR), where more detailed information about the driver's commercial driving history is found. When a jurisdiction convicts or withdraws an out-of-state commercial driver, the State of Conviction (SOC) or State of Withdrawal (SOW) transmits the relevant conviction or withdrawal information via AAMVAnet to the driver's SOR.

== Maintenance Fees ==
CDLIS maintenance fees cover the cost of the Central Site support and maintenance, AAMVAnet leased line services and support, Network Control Software, the AAMVA help desk, AAMVA's CDLIS development and testing, and AAMVA's CDLIS staff and contractors.

AAMVA's CDLIS maintenance fee, charged to each state, is $1 per year for each CDL record on CDLIS owned by the particular state.
