= Driver License Agreement =

In the United States, the Driver License Agreement (DLA) is an interstate compact written by the Joint Executive Board of the Driver License Compact (DLC) and the Non-Resident Violator Compact (NRVC) with staff support provided by the American Association of Motor Vehicle Administrators (AAMVA). The DLA requires all states to honor licenses issued by other member states, report traffic convictions to the licensing state, prohibit a member state from confiscating an out-of-state driver's license or jailing an out-of-state driver for a minor violation, and maintain a complete driver's history, including withdrawals and traffic convictions, including those committed in non-DLA states.

When a DLA member state receives a report concerning its drivers from a non-DLA member state, the member state will be required to treat the report the same as if it came from a member state. As with the previous compacts, the DLA requires a state to post all out-of-state traffic convictions to the driver's record and to apply its own laws to all out-of-state convictions. As with the previous compacts, the DLA allows other jurisdictions to access motor vehicle records in accordance with the Drivers' Privacy Protection Act (DPPA) and to transfer the driver's history when the driver transfers their license.

The DLA has some changes from the NRVC. Unlike the NRVC, under the DLA, an adverse action can be taken against a driver for failing to respond to violations, including equipment, registration, parking, and weight limit violations. Other changes from the NRVC are that, to keep their license, drivers just had to respond to the citation by paying the fine. Under the DLA, the driver must comply with any order from an out-of-state court. An example would be a driver from Arizona getting cited for tinted windows while traveling through Virginia, even though the tinted windows are legal in Arizona. The driver is ordered to fix the tint to comply with Virginia law, even though the driver has left Virginia. Under the NRVC, to retain said license, the driver pays the fine. Still, with DLA, the driver must do what the court says, including paying a fine, fixing vehicle equipment, and/or performing community service.

== History ==
Work on the Driver License Agreement began in 1994/1995 by the Driver License Compact and the Non-Resident Violator Compact Joint Executive Board, with the intent of combining and improving the compacts and making them enforceable, possibly with federal grant funding. Around the same time, Congress passed the North American Free Trade Agreement (NAFTA), and the Joint Executive Board decided jurisdictions in Mexico and Canada could join.

The federal government, through appropriations in Congress, funded the Joint Executive Board in writing the new Driver License Agreement. In 2000, the agreement was ratified by the U.S. states, with 2 states voting against. After the September 11 attacks in 2001, the Joint Executive Board strengthened driver license security provisions in the DLA, and the revised DLA was again ratified by the U.S. states, with some votes against. The information on who voted against the DLA is considered confidential and proprietary information by the AAMVA.

Connecticut was the first state to join in January 2002.

== States that are members ==
- Connecticut
- Arkansas – can join under administrative rulemaking under Act 446 as passed by the 2005 Legislative Session
- Massachusetts

== Notes ==
- The Driver License Agreement document (PDF)
- Real ID Act of 2005

== Legislation and other ==
- Legislation in the past has been sponsored in Kentucky, Michigan, Minnesota, and North Carolina to join
- There has been legislation in the past, introduced in the U.S. Congress, to mandate that states must participate. Such legislation included HR10 - 9/11 Implementation Act of 2004 and HR418 - The Real ID Act of 2005 but the mandate has not made it into the final bills.
- Driver's Privacy Protection Act
