= Non-Resident Violator Compact =

United States interstate compact

The Non-Resident Violator Compact (NRVC) is a United States interstate compact used by 44 states and Washington, D.C. to process traffic citations across state borders.

When a motorist is cited in another member state and chooses not to respond to a moving violation (such as not paying a ticket), the other state notifies the driver's home state, and the home state will suspend the driver's license until the driver takes care of the matter in the other state. The motorist whose home state is a member who incurs a moving violation in another member state is released on their own recognizance, with the promise to appear in court or pay the fine. In some member states, it is the motorist's responsibility (if cited) to provide documented proof of compliance with the out-of-state ticket promptly to avoid having their home state driving privilege revoked.

== Member states ==
All states plus the District of Columbia are members except Alaska, California, Michigan, Montana, Oregon, and Wisconsin.
