= Road speed limit enforcement in the United Kingdom =

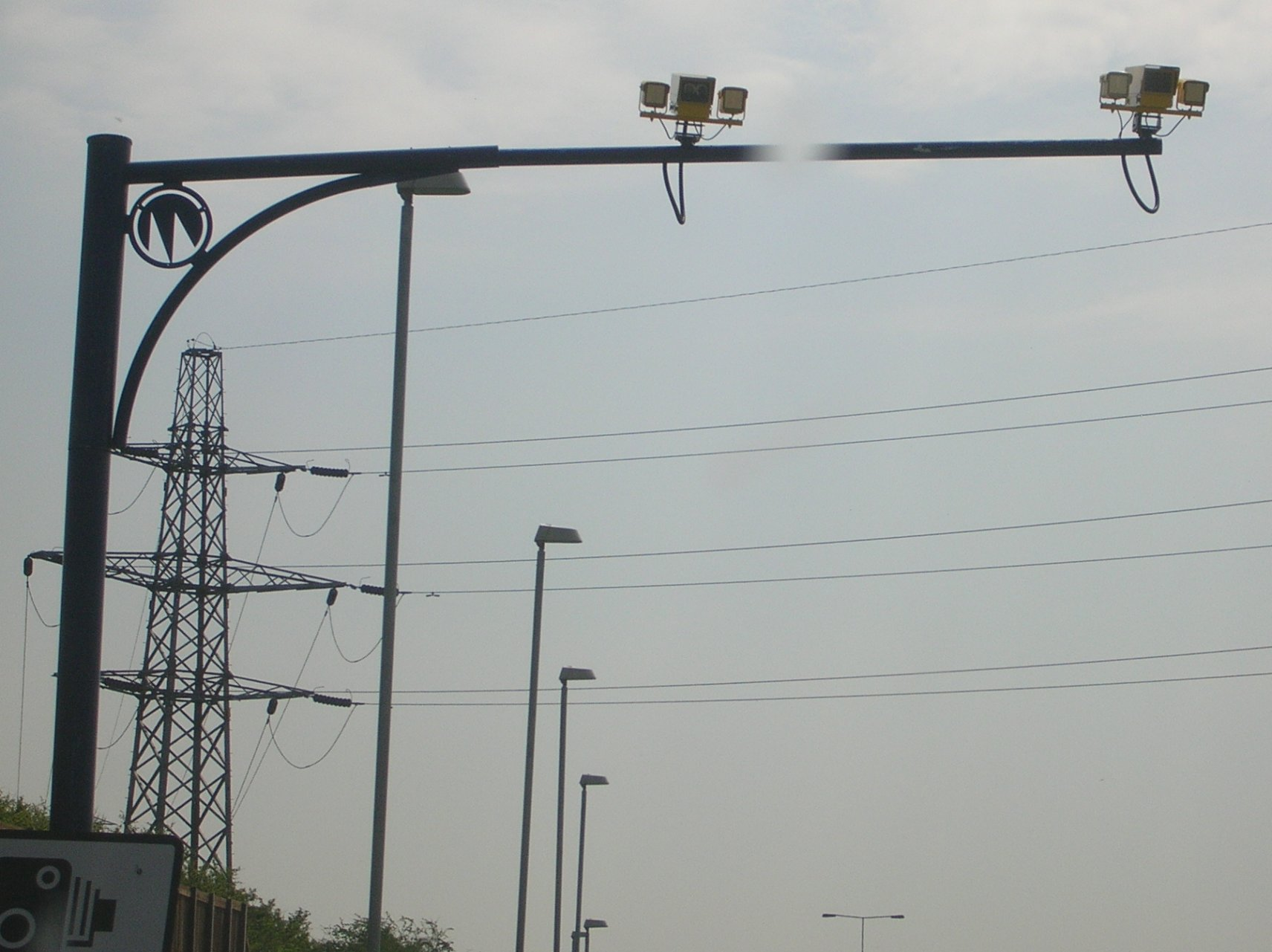
SPECS average speed cameras above a motorway

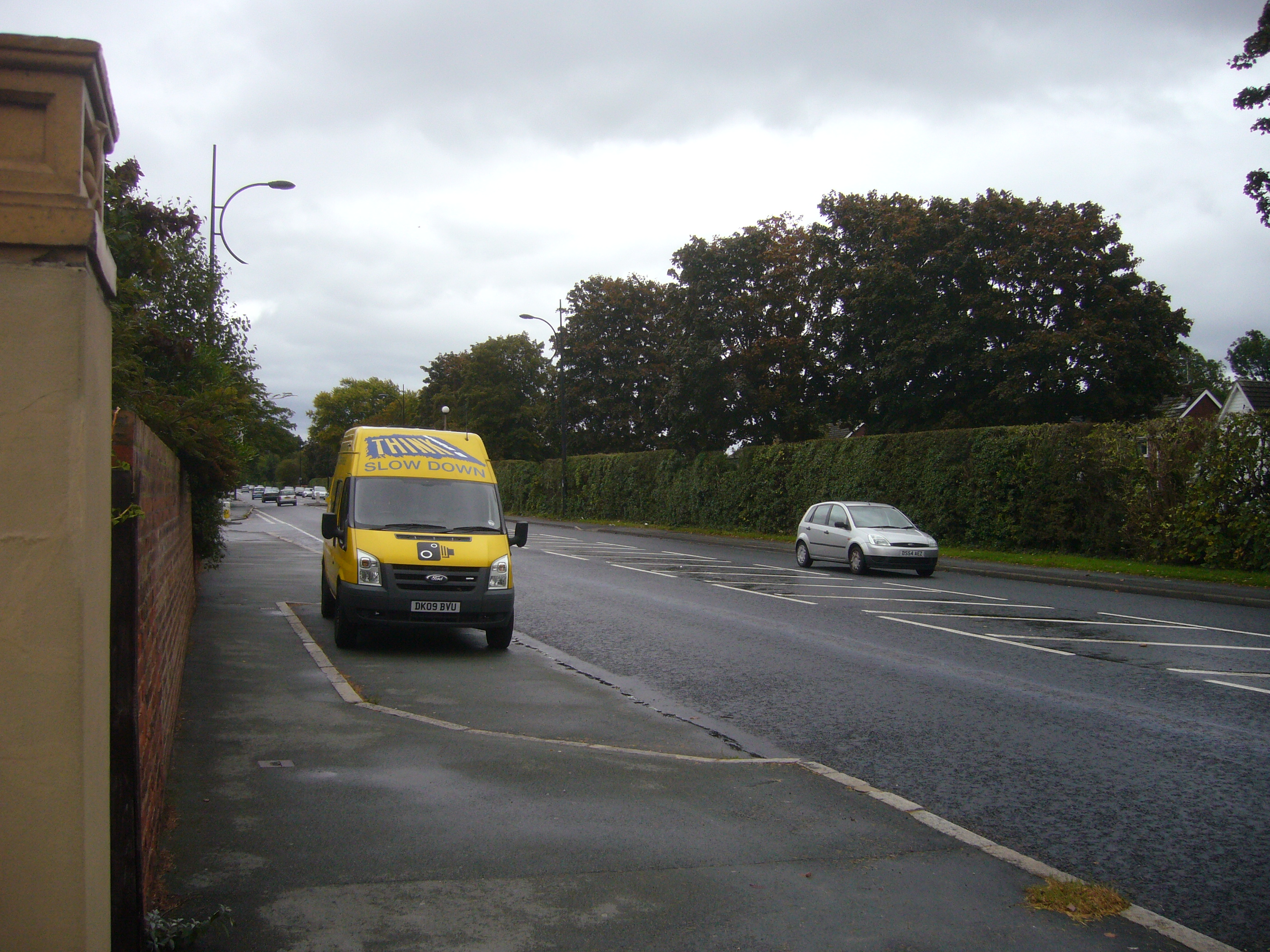
Temporary roadside speed limit enforcement

Road speed limit enforcement in the United Kingdom is the action taken by appropriately empowered authorities to attempt to persuade road vehicle users to comply with the speed limits in force on the UK's roads. Methods used include those for detection and prosecution of contraventions such as roadside fixed speed cameras, average speed cameras, and police-operated LIDAR speed guns or older radar speed guns. Vehicle activated signs and Community Speed Watch schemes are used to encourage compliance. Some classes of vehicles are fitted with speed limiters and intelligent speed adaptation is being trialled in some places on a voluntary basis.

During 2006/7 a total of 1.75 million drivers had their licenses endorsed with 3 penalty points and £114 million was raised from fines; an 'e-petition' to ban speed cameras during 2007 received 28,000 signatures. The Department for Transport estimated that cameras had led to a 22% reduction in personal injury collisions and 42% fewer people being killed or seriously injured at camera sites. Injury Prevention reported that speed cameras were effective at reducing accidents and injuries in their vicinity and recommended wider deployment. An LSE study in 2017 found that "adding another 1,000 cameras to British roads could save up to 190 lives annually, reduce up to 1,130 collisions and mitigate 330 serious injuries."

A survey conducted in 2010 by The Automobile Association indicated that speed cameras were supported by 75% of their members.

== Rationale ==
Enforcement is used to increase compliance with speed limits.

One of the main motivations for enforcement is to reduce road casualties, particularly at accident blackspots. For 2008, "exceeding the speed limit" was reported as one of the contributory factors in 5% of all casualty collisions (14% of fatal collisions resulting in 15% of all deaths). (Note: Department for Transport (2009), p. 45 "Exceeding the speed limit was reported as a contributory factor in 5 per cent of all accidents. However, the factor became more significant with the severity of the accident. It was reported in 14 per cent of fatal accidents and these accidents accounted for 362 fatalities, 15 per cent of all deaths")

The Royal Society for the Prevention of Accidents estimates that a pedestrian has a 90% chance of surviving being hit by a car at 20 mph, falling to 50% chance at 30 mph and to 10% at 40 mph. The government noted that the change from "mainly survivable injuries to mainly fatal injuries" takes place at speeds between 30 and 40 mph. One third of drivers thought that the chances of a pedestrian dying if hit at 40 mph was 50% or less. Parliament noted that most deaths of pedestrian occurred in urban areas (where the speed limit ranges from 20 to 40 mph).

A 2003 survey of drivers for the Department for Transport found that 58% break speed limits on 30 mph roads and 25% break them by more than 5 mph. 57% break speed limits on motorways and 20% break them by more than 10 mph. In 2002 the Select Committee on Transport stated that "Most drivers and pedestrians think speeds are generally too high but 95 per cent of all drivers admit to exceeding them".

Groups most likely to speed excessively are those driving in a work related capacity, members of high income households and young males. Motorcyclists also frequently speed as do HGV drivers commonly on single carriageway main roads where their speed limit is 50 mph.

== Methods ==
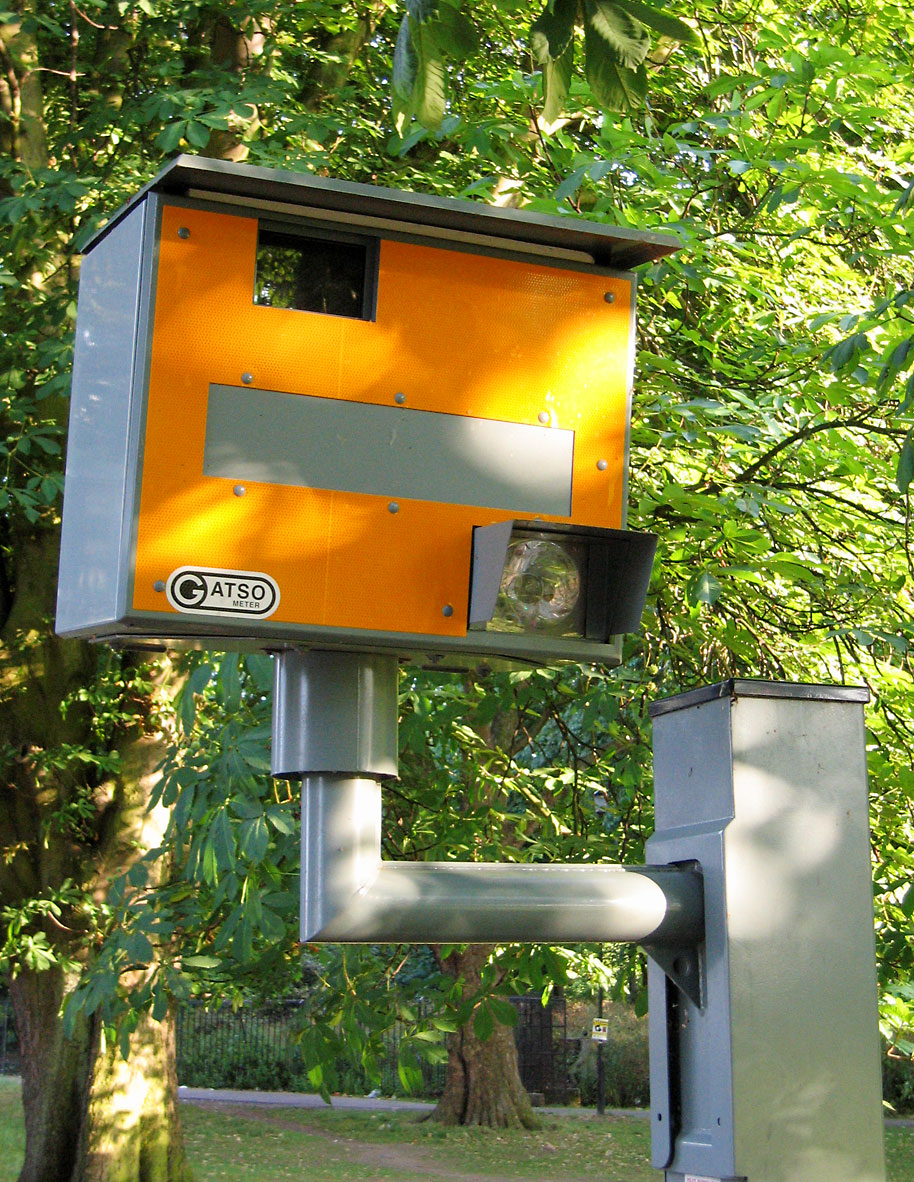
Gatso speed camera

There are many methods used by authorities, in places where the speed limits are not generally observed, to attempt to achieve greater compliance. These methods generally fall into one of two categories:

- to attempt to identify drivers or vehicles that are breaking the speed limit for the purposes of prosecution,
- to remind vehicle users what the speed limit is, and that it should be obeyed.

There are several types of speed camera in use. Speed cameras must be calibrated and undergo Home Office Type Approval before the images from it are acceptable to the court, including the cameras used in police vehicles. Owners of vehicles photographed may be contacted with a 'Notice of Intended Prosecution' (NIP) requiring them to provide the name and address of the driver. If they do not provide this information they may receive a Court summons for 'Failing to Furnish Driver Details'. "Higher speeds" result in prosecution by way of a 'Conditional Offer Fixed Penalty' which can be settled by accepting a £100 fine and three penalty points. "Excessive speed offences" are automatically sent to the court.

=== Fixed instantaneous speed cameras ===
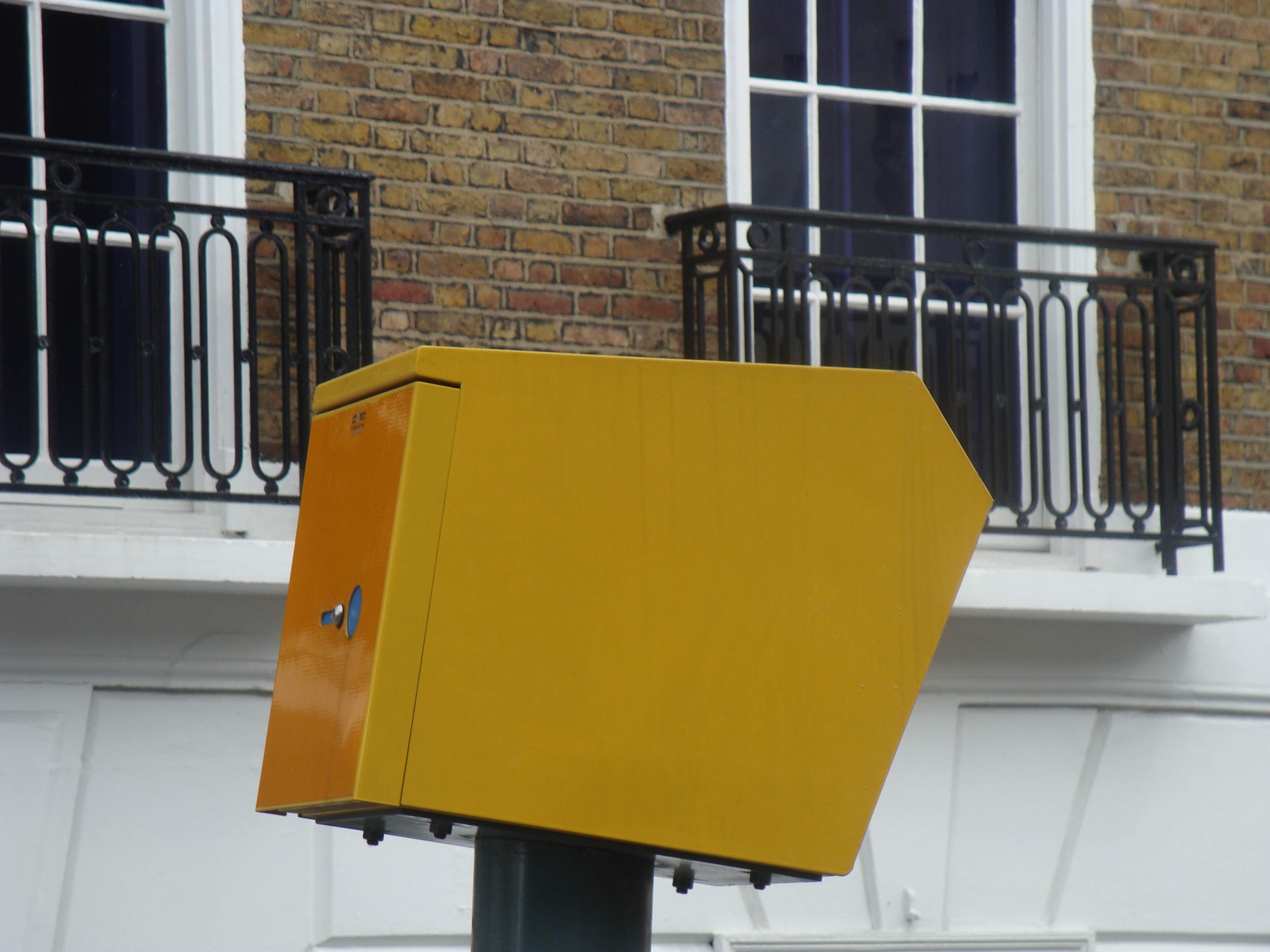
SpeedCurb speed camera, London July 2009, side view

These cameras are installed beside a road and record the instantaneous speed of vehicles and a photograph of vehicles that have been identified as breaking the speed limit. There are two types commonly in use:

- Gatso cameras, which take a photograph of the rear of the vehicle after the vehicle has passed,
- Truvelo / D-cam digital cameras which use infrared to take a picture of a vehicle as it approaches, which includes an image of the driver. These cameras then transmit the image and speed to the authorities virtually instantly.

=== Police operated equipment ===
Police officers can use LIDAR speed guns or sometimes the older and less accurate radar speed guns to gather evidence for prosecution. These may be operated from temporary static sites or from within police vehicles.

=== Average speed cameras ===
Known as the SPECS system, these cameras measure average speeds over a known or measured distance. The first average speed camera in Scotland was installed on the A77 road in 2004.

=== Vehicle activated signs ===
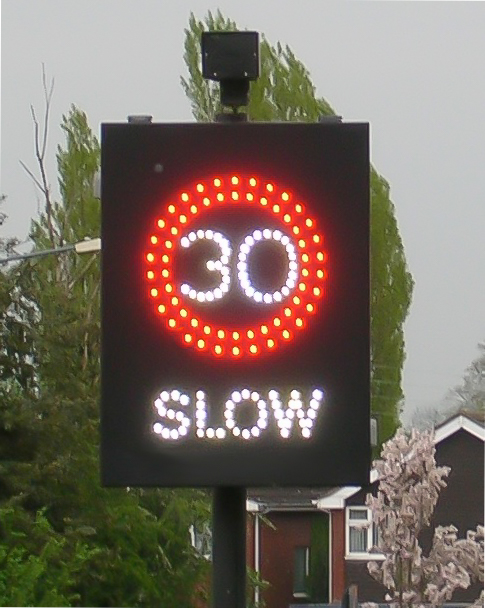
Vehicle activated sign

Vehicle activated signs that illuminate to indicate to a driver that they are exceeding the speed limit – these do not result in the issuance of a penalty, merely serve as a warning.

=== Community Speed Watch ===
Community Speed Watch is a partnership between local people, the Police, the Fire Service and local councils. Volunteers spend a short time each week monitoring speeds and noting number plates. Those identified as speeding are sent a warning letter and the police will take further action if the same vehicle is identified as speeding three times. Community Speed Watch is only permitted for speed limits of 40 mph or below. Junior Speed Watch works in a similar way but involves schoolchildren.

=== Speed limiters ===
Some classes of vehicles are required to have speed limiters which enforce a maximum speed by physical means. New vehicles should be fitted with limiters as follows. Buses and coaches: 70 mph (113 km/h) (Note: Department for Transport (2008), p.181 "Speed limiter settings lowered to 70 mph for new buses and coaches and to 60 mph for HGVs.") HGVs: 60 mph (97 km/h) Mopeds: 30 mph (48 km/h) (Note: Department for Transport (2008), p.179 "Mopeds redefined to 30 mph maximum design speed") Older vehicles still in use do not have limiters fitted or have them set at a higher speeds. These devices do not enforce speed limits as they do not adapt to speed limit changes.

=== Speed triggered traffic lights ===
In 2011, Swindon borough council trialled installing equipment on some of their traffic light systems so that they will turn to red early if a car is detected travelling above a preset speed on the approach. A Swindon councillor is reported to have said, "The whole key is to monitor driver behaviour without beating them over the head. … It may annoy them, but I think eventually people will work out that if they maintain a constant speed at or around the speed limit then actually their journey times will be much shorter because they won't be getting delayed by traffic lights." The RAC Foundation gave a cautious welcome to the trial. Similar systems are already in use in Spain and Portugal.

=== Intelligent speed adaptation ===
A trial of intelligent speed adaptation is available in London. Drivers can install free software in their TomTom GPS sat-nav units to provide a warning if they are exceeding the speed limit. In addition a 'voluntary ISA' system which uses technology installed in the vehicle which makes it difficult to accidentally accelerate beyond the speed limit is being developed. This technology is expected to be available on a voluntary basis with no current plans for vehicles to be required to be fitted with it.

=== TASCAR ===
TASCAR stands for Temporary Automatic Speed Camera at Road works, and is the term used by the Highways Agency and other relevant organisations for speed enforcement at works carried out by or on behalf of the agency on the UK road network.

Different rules apply for the placement of these cameras than for cameras used for general enforcement elsewhere.

== Effectiveness ==
=== Speed cameras ===
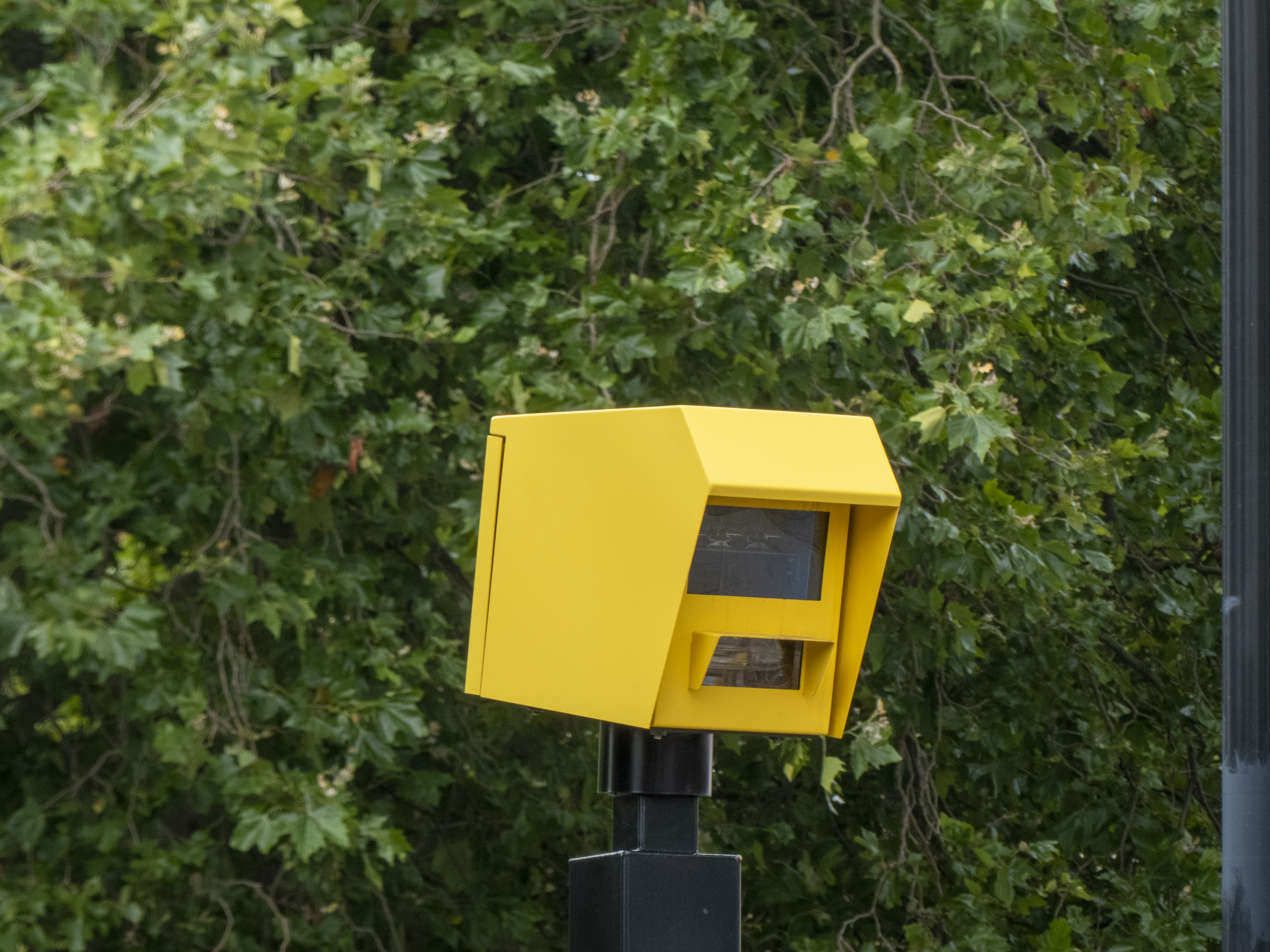
The front of a SpeedCurb camera in Millbank, London

An LSE study in 2017 found that speed cameras reduced fatalities by 58 to 68% within 500 metres of the cameras and "adding another 1,000 cameras to British roads could save up to 190 lives annually, reduce up to 1,130 collisions and mitigate 330 serious injuries."

A 2013 study by the RAC found a 27% reduction in fatal and serious collisions in the vicinity of speed cameras.

In 2001 the Nottingham Safety Camera Pilot achieved "virtually complete compliance" on the major ring road into the city using average speed cameras, across all Nottinghamshire SPECS installations, KSI (Killed / Seriously Injured) figures have fallen by an average of 65%.

In 2003, Injury Prevention reported that speed cameras were effective at reducing accidents and injuries and recommended wider deployment. In February 2005 the British Medical Journal again reported that speed cameras were an effective intervention in reducing road traffic collisions and related casualties, noting however that most studies to date did not have satisfactory control groups. In 2003 Northumbria Police's Acting Chief Inspector of motor patrols suggested that cameras didn't reduce casualties but did raise revenue – an official statement from the police force later re-iterated that speed cameras do reduce casualties.

In December 2005 the Department for Transport published a four-year report into Safety Camera Partnerships which concluded that there was a 22% reduction in personal injury collisions and 42% fewer people being killed or seriously injured following the installation of cameras. The Times reported that this research showed that the department had been previous exaggerating the safety benefits of speed cameras but that the results were still 'impressive'.

A report published by the RAC Foundation in 2010 estimated that an additional 800 more people a year could be killed or seriously injured on the UK's roads if all speed cameras were scrapped. A survey conducted by The Automobile Association in May 2010 indicated that speed cameras were supported by 75% of their members.

In 2017, the first average speed camera system on an urban road in Scotland began operating. In the following year, there were no crashes resulting in an injury (compared to six in the three years 2013–2015) and the number of speeding offences dropped from three in every five vehicles to around two per day (out of around 15,000 vehicles per day).

There is also evidence against the efficacy of speed cameras. Within four years of Swindon abandoning the use of fixed speed cameras, arguing that the cost did not represent an effective way to reduce road accidents, the town was the safest town to drive in the UK, based on accident rates per 1,000 registered vehicles: a result linked by the Local Authority Member for Council Transformation, Transport and Strategic Planning to the removal of speed cameras and resultant additional funding for road safety, alongside close working with the police.

=== Vehicle activated signs ===
The MP Angela Watkinson stated in parliament in 2008 that vehicle activated signs were more effective than speed cameras – Department for Transport figures showed that each vehicle-activated sign was estimated to prevent 3.1 accidents per year compared to 2.2 for speed cameras. Jim Fitzpatrick the Under-Secretary of State for Transport questioned her source.

Following the decision by Portsmouth City Council to remove all their speed cameras, a councillor stated that the evidence is that vehicle activated signs are at least as effective at reducing traffic speeds as speed cameras and at one-tenth of the cost. In 2006 Transport Minister Stephen Ladyman issued a retraction accepting that VAS were indeed ten times more cost effective than cameras. The data behind this came from the Transport Research Laboratory report TRL548 from 2003, which was commissioned by the Department for Transport but was not included in their earlier figures.

== History ==
=== Historical methods ===
==== Time and distance ====
Before the availability of such technology the police would time drivers over a known distance to calculate their speed.

==== Pacing ====
The police would sometimes follow the target vehicle at a constant distance, and use the speed reading from their own calibrated speedometer as evidence of the speed of the vehicle being followed.

=== Early years ===
The Highway Act 1835 allowed cart owners to be traced when it introduced the offence of 'Negligence causing damage to person or goods being conveyed on the highway', not having the owners name painted on the side of a cart, and refusing to give the owner's name.

The early Locomotive Acts between 1866 and 1896 effectively calmed self-propelled traffic by requiring that a man walked in front of each vehicle with a red flag, and so the imposed speed limits of 2 miles per hour (3.2 km/h) and 4 miles per hour (6.4 km/h) did not require enforcing.

The first person to be convicted of speeding in the UK was Walter Arnold of East Peckham, Kent, who on 28 January 1896 was fined for speeding at 8 mph (13 km/h), thus exceeding the contemporary speed limit of 2 mph (3.2 km/h). He was fined one shilling plus costs.

The Automobile Association was formed in 1905 to help motorists avoid police speed traps. In 1906 Earl Russell, an early motoring enthusiast, compared 'speed traps' to 'highway robbery' in Parliament: "Policemen are not stationed in the villages where there are people about who might be in danger, but are hidden in hedges or ditches by the side of the most open roads in the country... they are used in many counties merely as a means of extracting money from the passing traveller in a way which reminds one of the highwaymen of the Middle Ages".

In 1910 in legal test case ('Betts -v- Stevens') involving an Automobile Association patrolman and a potentially speeding motorist the Chief Justice, Lord Alverston, ruled that where a patrolman signals to a speeding driver to slow down and thereby avoid a speed trap then that person would have committed the offence of 'obstructing an officer in the course of his duty' under the Prevention of Crimes Amendment Act 1885. Subsequently, the organisation developed a coded warning system which was used until the 1960s whereby a patrolman would always salute the driver of a passing car which showed a visible AA Badge unless there was a speed trap nearby, on the understanding that their officers could not be prosecuted for failing to salute.

All speed limits for cars and motorcycles were abolished under the Road Traffic Act 1930 because 'the existing speed limit was so universally disobeyed that its maintenance brought the law into contempt'.

Speedometers were made compulsory for new cars in 1937.

=== Electronic aids ===
By the late 1980s traffic police were being issued with Laser speed guns which enabled them to measure the speed of a vehicle more precisely.

=== 1991 – March 2007: speed cameras ===
Traffic sign used to inform of an area in which speed cameras are used

The first speed camera was installed in 1991. A camera that was installed on the M40 motorway and recorded 400 instances of speeding within 40 minutes. The Association of British Drivers was formed the same year and campaigned vigorously against speed cameras.

A statutory instrument, 'The Road Traffic Offenders (Prescribed Devices) Order 1992' was approved in May 1992 coming into force 1 July 1992 allowing for unattended traffic cameras to be used for prosecution of speeding offences. The Gatsometer BV Type 24 was approved in June 1992. The LTI 20.20, a police operated LIDAR speed gun received type approval in 1993.

The charity Brake was formed in 1995 to support traffic victims and campaign for effective enforcement of speed limits. The charity RoadPeace was founded in 1990 and has since actively campaigned to increase the number of speed cameras. In 1991 the government launched a major TV campaign 'Kill your speed, not a child' with the budget rising from an initial £1m to £3.5m in 1997.

Research published in February 1999 showed that cameras reduce drivers' speeds markedly and were perceived to be reasonably effective. Safety Camera Partnerships were introduced by the Department for Transport in December 1999 with eight initial trial areas. In 1999 income from penalties for offences recorded by cameras was approaching £100 million.

In 1999 there was an increase in road fatalities for only the second time in 10 years (the previous time being in 1997). (Note: Department for Transport (2008), p. 106 table 2)

In March 2000 the government launched a new road-safety strategy that would focus specifically on speed aiming to reduce road fatalities and serious injuries by 40%, and by 60% for children by 2010 (compared to the average of 1994–1998). A similar level of 10-year casualty reduction had been consistently achieved over each of the previous eight years. Safe Speed was founded to challenge this strategy and campaign against the crack-down on speed.

In April 2000 two motorists caught speeding and challenged the Road Traffic Act 1988 which required the registered keeper of a vehicle to identify the driver at a particular time as being in contradiction to the Human Rights Act 1998 on the grounds that it amounted to a 'compulsory confession', also that since the camera partnerships included the police, local authorities, Magistrates Courts Service (MCS) and Crown Prosecution Service (CPS) which had a financial interest in the fine revenue that they would not get a fair trial. Their plea was initially granted by a judge then overturned but was then heard by the European Court of Human Rights (ECtHR), and the European Court of Justice (ECJ). In 2007 the European Court of Human Rights found there was no breach of article 6 in requiring the keepers of cars caught speeding on camera to provide the name of the driver.

During 2001 The Road Vehicles (Display of Registration Marks) Regulations 2001 made it illegal to alter, rearrange or misrepresent the letters or numbers on a registration plate (number plate), with a maximum fine of up to £1000. The Vehicles (Crime) Act 2001 introduced registration for number plate suppliers, regulate the specifications for registration plates and provided new 'Unified power for Secretary of State to fund speed cameras etc.'

The Transport Research Laboratory published a report on traffic management at major motorway road works in January 2004. Safe Speed received a copy of the then unpublished report and claimed that it showed that fixed cameras increased the risk of injury accidents 55 per cent at road works and by 31 per cent on open motorways, also that fatal and serious crashes were 32 per cent more likely where cameras were being operated'.

The first average speed camera in Scotland was installed on the A77 road in 2004. Vehicle speeds significantly reduced immediately after the system was installed, the average being reduced by 5–6 mph and the number of drivers exceeding the speed limit by 80% or more in some areas.

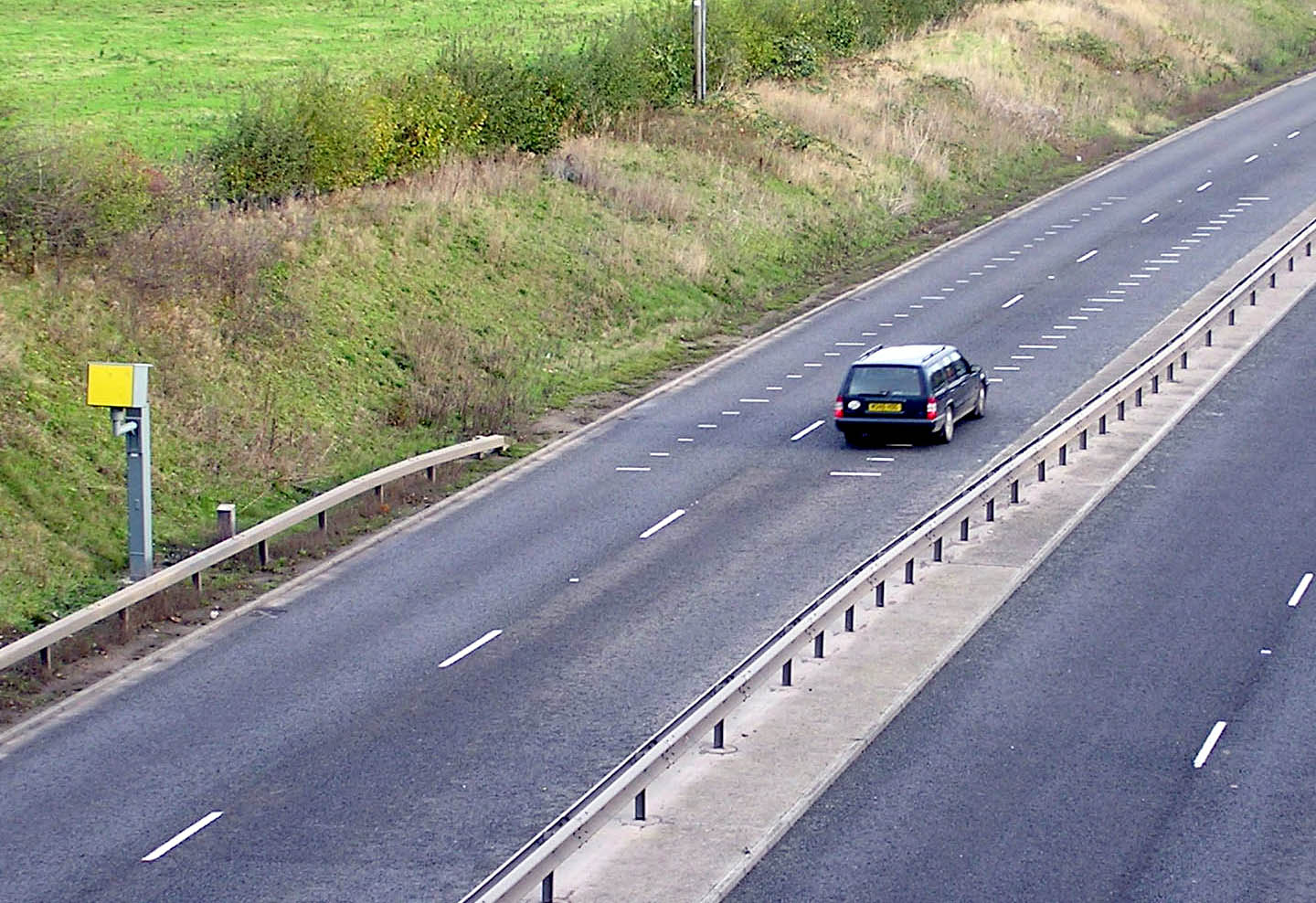
Gatso speed camera on a dual carriageway showing characteristic road markings

In March 2005 a BBC program Inside Out demonstrated how the LTI 20.20 LIDAR speed gun, of which 3,500 were in use in the UK, could create exaggerated reading. Errors came from two sources. 'Sweep errors' were as a result of the camera not measuring the distance to a fixed point on the vehicle but instead being 'swept' along the side of the vehicle. This was demonstrated by sweeping the target along a wall which was recorded as moving at 58 mph. Another way of achieving a bogus reading was where the laser reflected off a wing mirror, hit a stationary reflective object and then returned reflecting off the mirror a second time.

In July 2005 the Department for Transport blocked the installation of nearly 500 new speed cameras over concerns that partnerships have failed to consider alternatives.

A 2006 report from the Department for Transport estimated that 'exceeding the speed limit' was a fact in 12% of fatal road crashes and 5% of all casualty crashes. In the year 2006/2007 1.75 million drivers had 3 points put on their licenses and a total of £114 million of fines were issued. The 2006 AA road map controversially included the location for thousands of speed cameras – the first time such information was available in that form. A trial of number-plate displaying vehicle activated signs in 2006 at roadworks on the M42 motorway resulted in half of the speeding traffic slowed down, compared to a third who responded to normal speed cameras.

As of April 2006 there were thirty eight Safety Camera Partnerships in England and Wales covering forty-one police force areas out of a total of forty-three. The Road Safety Act 2006 introduced new legislation relating to road safety grants, the application of surplus income from safety camera enforcement and regulation relating to fixed fines. From April 2007 authorities received a 'Road Safety Grant' which was no longer related to the number of fines issued locally and was instead given directly to those local authorities responsible for road safety regardless or not of whether they operate traffic enforcement cameras.

During 2007 a e-petition to ban speed cameras organised by Safe Speed received 28,000 signatures.

=== April 2007–present ===
Funding for Safety Camera Partnership changed in April 2007 and has subsequently come from Department for Transport as 'Road Safety Grants' rather than being directly linked to money raised locally from fines as it had been previously.

Swindon in Wiltshire switched off their five fixed cameras in July 2009, with the intention of replacing them with vehicle activated speed warning signs. They thus became the first local council with no fixed cameras, although the police will continue to use their mobile speed cameras to enforce speed limits. In the nine months following the switch-off there was a small reduction in casualty rates between similar periods before and after the switch off (Before: 1 fatal, 1 serious and 13 slight accidents. Afterwards: no fatalities, 2 serious and 12 slight accidents). The journalist George Monbiot claimed that the results were not statistically significant, highlighting earlier findings across the whole of Wiltshire that there had been a 33% reduction in the number of people killed and seriously injured generally and a 68% reduction at camera sites during the previous three years.

A report by ICM Research (an Opinion poll research organisation) sponsored by motor insurance company LV in 2010 indicated that 1% of accidents were caused by drivers braking and then accelerating near speed cameras and that this would equate to a total of some 28,000 accidents across the country. A spokesman said that speed cameras 'impair driving ability or at the least concentration on the road'.

In May 2010 the new Coalition government said that the 'Labour's 13-year war on the motorist is over' and that the new government 'pledged to scrap public funding for speed cameras'. In July 2010, Mike Penning, the Road safety minister reduced the Road Safety Grant for the current year to Local Authorities from £95 million to £57 million saying that local authorities had relied too heavily on safety cameras for far too long and that he was pleased that some councils were now focusing on other road safety measures. It is estimated that as a result the Treasury is now distributing £40 million less in Road Safety Grant than is raised from fines in the year. The cuts include a 27% to the revenue grant used for camera maintenance and education programs and 100% to the capital grant used for road safety measures such as the installation of fixed cameras, speed humps and pedestrian crossings. Brake warned that by removing ring-fencing the cuts could in reality be larger. Penning later said "road safety grant was reduced as this grant was spread evenly across all local authorities, not because this was considered an area of lower priority spending."

In June 2010 it was announced that 9 of Somerset's 26 fixed speed cameras were to be switched off.

In July 2010, the BBC reported that the Devon and Cornwall Safety Camera Partnership was to be wound up, and that no speed camera would be operated in the South West from the following year unless funding was provided by the government. Also in July 2010 one-fifth of the speed cameras in Northamptonshire were switched off – the council would not reveal which of its 42 cameras remained active, and others announced plans to review camera provision. and a total of four other counties; Buckinghamshire, Lancashire, Dorset and Essex announced plans to turn off some or all of their cameras;

All the Oxfordshire speed cameras were switched off on 1 August 2010. Later in August an Oxford Mail report challenged a claim by Thames Valley Safer Roads Partnership that speed offences had increased since the switch-off, stating that they have received data showing that speed offences actually fell by 4 per-cent when compared the figures since the switch-off to those of 2008–9. In September, Oxfordshire's Thames Valley Safer Roads Partnership reported that the number of drivers speeding past the county's deactivated speed cameras had increased by up to 88%. Following lobbying by road safety groups and by local residents it was announced in November that they would be reinstated.

The Oxfordshire cameras were switched back on in April 2011 after a new source of funding was found for them. Following rule changes on the threshold for offering "Speed Awareness Courses" as an alternative to a fine and licence points for drivers, and given that the compulsory fees charged for such courses go directly to the partnerships rather than directly to central government as for the fine revenues, the partnership will be able to fund their operations from course fees. Compared with the same period in the previous year with the cameras still switched on, the number of serious injuries that occurred during the same period with the cameras switched off was exactly the same – at 13 – and the number of slight injuries was 15 more at 70, resulting from 62 crashes – 2 more than when the cameras were still operating. There were no fatalities during either period.

In July 2010, some opposition politicians and some road safety campaigners claimed that lives were being put at risk by the removal of speed cameras. The AA agreed saying adding that cameras were supported by the majority of motorists.

In August 2010, Gloucestershire cancelled plans to update cameras and reduced or cancelled maintenance contracts.

In October 2010, Wiltshire switched off its remaining speed cameras, both fixed and mobile. Speed limit enforcement will continue to be provided in the county by Wiltshire's traffic police and Community Speed Watch.

In December 2010, Portsmouth City Council decided to end its membership of the Hampshire and Isle of Wight Road Safety Partnership, and to remove all its speed cameras.

In 2017 fines issued by courts for the most serious speeding offences have increased to better reflect the seriousness of the offence. On 24 April 2017 new rules came into force which see the maximum fine for being caught speeding increase by 150% to £2,500 from £1,000 for the most serious offenders. The minimum penalty for speeding remains a £100 fine and 3 penalty points added to your licence.

A 2017 Freedom of Information request found that 52% of speed cameras in the UK were switched on. The report showed that four out of the 45 police forces in the UK had no working speed cameras and that West Yorkshire, South Yorkshire, Greater Manchester, Kent and Cheshire police forces had a quarter or less active cameras. The report found that City of London, Metropolitan Police/TfL, Lancashire, Nottinghamshire, Suffolk and Northern Ireland police forces said that all of their cameras are active. The reason for this has been a cut in funding and many cameras, most notably many Gatso and Truvelo Combi speed cameras, still used older film technologies rather than newer digital technologies.

== See also ==
- SPECS (speed camera)
- Speed limit
- Speed limit enforcement
- Traffic enforcement camera
