= Watchman camera =

Traffic management practice

The Watchman Casualty Reduction Scheme is a traffic calming measure used in the United Kingdom. The scheme comprises various methods to reduce traffic speed including cameras and Variable Message Signs which flash the speed limit when a driver is going too fast. The cameras do not issue fines or penalty points to the driver, but record the number plate, speed and time of vehicles. The scheme has been very effective on keeping general traffic speeds below the limit of the road. Each Watchman System comes standard with high-speed communications allowing access to live and recorded video images without having to physically visit the unit. This feature allows traffic managers remote access from a PC, laptop or dedicated control room. Each unit can be programmed to take appropriate automatic action upon detecting a certain speed of vehicle, for example, automatically issuing a letter to the owners of vehicles traveling in excess of 50 mph on a particular stretch of road, or to capture on video the passage of vehicles driving above a certain speed.

They work by constantly emitting radar signals to detect speeding vehicles, similar to traffic enforcement cameras. They have two cameras, one is used to monitor the road, and the other records the number plate of vehicles, by employing the Number Plate Recognition System. Since these cameras have rear facing lenses as well, one can not avoid them by slowing down as they approach the camera.

In addition to recording the information of speeding vehicles, a Watchman System can also be used for long-term analysis of traffic movement by counting each passing vehicle and registering its speed. Details of up to 2 million vehicles can be stored into its hard disk, in essence creating a traffic census for the stretch of road. It can also be used to track suspect vehicles after crimes.

== See also ==
- Security cameras
