= Safe Speed =

British advocacy group against speed cameras

Safe Speed's logo, a roundel with the group's initials.

Safe Speed was a United Kingdom-based pressure group that campaigned against speed cameras, claiming that it did so on the grounds of road safety.

== History ==
The organisation was started in 2001 by Paul Smith, a former computer electronics engineer, which ran from Smith's home in Scotland. Following Smith's death in 2007 the campaign was taken over by his partner Claire Armstrong.

== Criticism ==
There have been few formal studies evaluating the claims made by Safe Speed:

- George Monbiot has argued that Safe Speed is much more about speed than safety, and is part of a "culture of speed".
- The claim that "one third of road deaths are due to speed cameras" was disputed by the Parliamentary Advisory Council for Transport Safety (PACTS) and by the National Safety Camera Scheme which cite seatbelt and alcohol laws introduced prior to the 1990s, and recent increased road use and mobile phone use as better explanations for the perceived increase in casualties. Safe Speed's method of extrapolating from two years' data is also disputed.
- Which? magazine reported that the Parliamentary Advisory Council for Transport Safety (PACTS) and the National Safety Camera Liaison (NSCL) cite three studies which do allow for long-term trends, and which confirm the correlation between speed cameras and accident reduction. The magazine also reported that the Transport Research Laboratory (TRL) disputes Safe Speed's interpretation of TRL 323. In particular they state that the study was dependent on subjective judgements of primary cause, and that many of the other primary causes listed also implied excessive speed. Other TRL studies (e.g. 421 and 511) have examined the relationship between speed and accidents and suggest a strong association. A study of over 300 roads, encompassing several hundred thousand observations, demonstrated that the higher the average speed of traffic on a given type of road, the more accidents there are. The study also demonstrated that injury accidents rise as average speed increases (if all else remains constant).
