= Traffic calming =

Road safety design measure

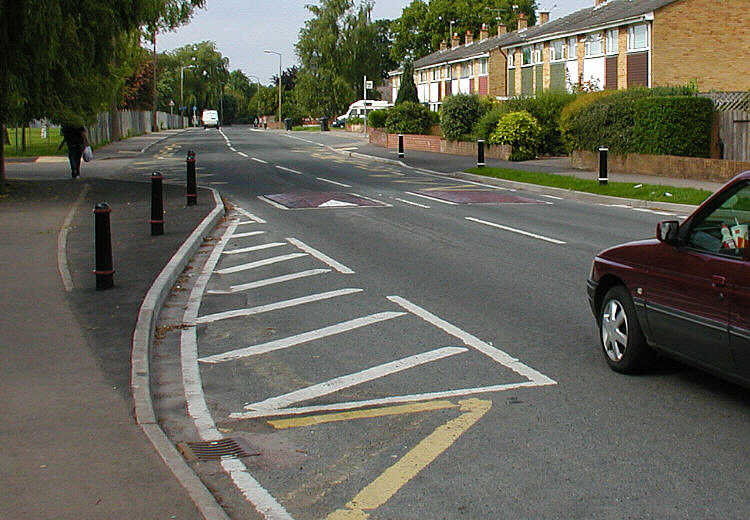
Two traffic calming measures on a road in England which aim to slow down drivers. The speed cushions (the two reddish raised pads or bumps) discourage fast driving. The curb extension (marked by the black posts and white stripes) extend into the road and narrows the area for driving, which tends to reduce drivers' speed.

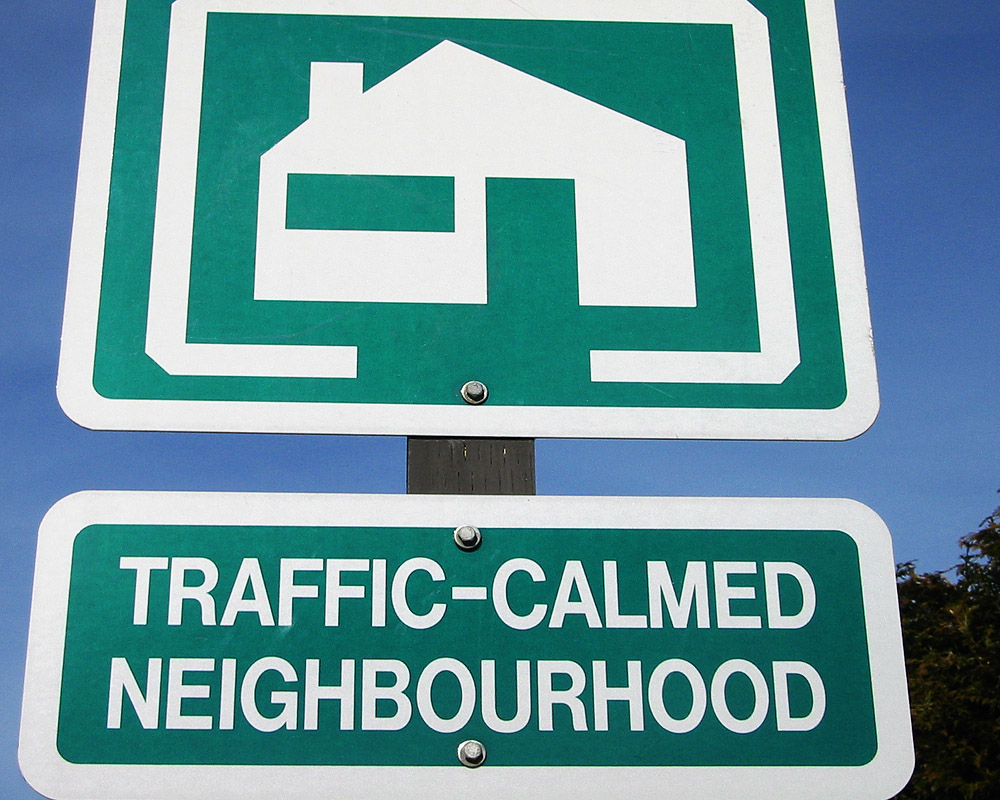
Signage indicating that a motorist is approaching traffic calming devices

Traffic calming is the use of traffic engineering measures, such as road design, traffic signs, road surface markings and road use rule changes, to slow down traffic and improve road safety for motorists, pedestrians, and cyclists. It has become a tool used by urban planners and road designers to combat speeding and other unsafe behaviours of drivers. It aims to encourage safer, more responsible driving and potentially restrict traffic flow. Urban planners and traffic engineers have many strategies for traffic calming, including narrowed roads and speed humps. Such measures are common in Australia and Europe (especially Northern Europe), but less so in North America, where the focus is often more on facilitating motorized traffic flow. Although they are becoming more popular. Traffic calming is a calque (literal translation) of the German word Verkehrsberuhigung. The term's first published use in English was in 1985 by Carmen Hass-Klau.

== History ==
In its early development in the UK in the 1930s, traffic calming was based on the idea that residential areas should be protected from through-traffic. Subsequently, it became valued for its ability to improve pedestrian safety and reduce noise and air pollution from traffic.

For much of the 20th century, streets were designed by engineers who were charged only with ensuring smooth motor vehicular traffic flow and not with fostering the other functions of streets. Traffic calming initiatives have grown to consider other design functions as well. For example, it has been shown that car traffic severely impairs the social and recreational functions of public streets. The Livable Streets study by Donald Appleyard (1981) found that residents of streets with light traffic had, on average, three more friends and twice as many acquaintances as the people on streets with heavy traffic which were otherwise similar in dimensions, income, etc.

== Measures ==
Traffic engineers refer to three "E's" when discussing traffic calming: engineering, (community) education, and (police) enforcement. Because neighborhood traffic management studies have shown that residents often contribute to the perceived speeding problem within their neighborhoods, instructions on traffic calming (for example in Hass-Klau et al., 1992) stress that the most effective traffic calming plans entail all three components—that engineering measures alone will not produce satisfactory results.

=== Horizontal deflection ===
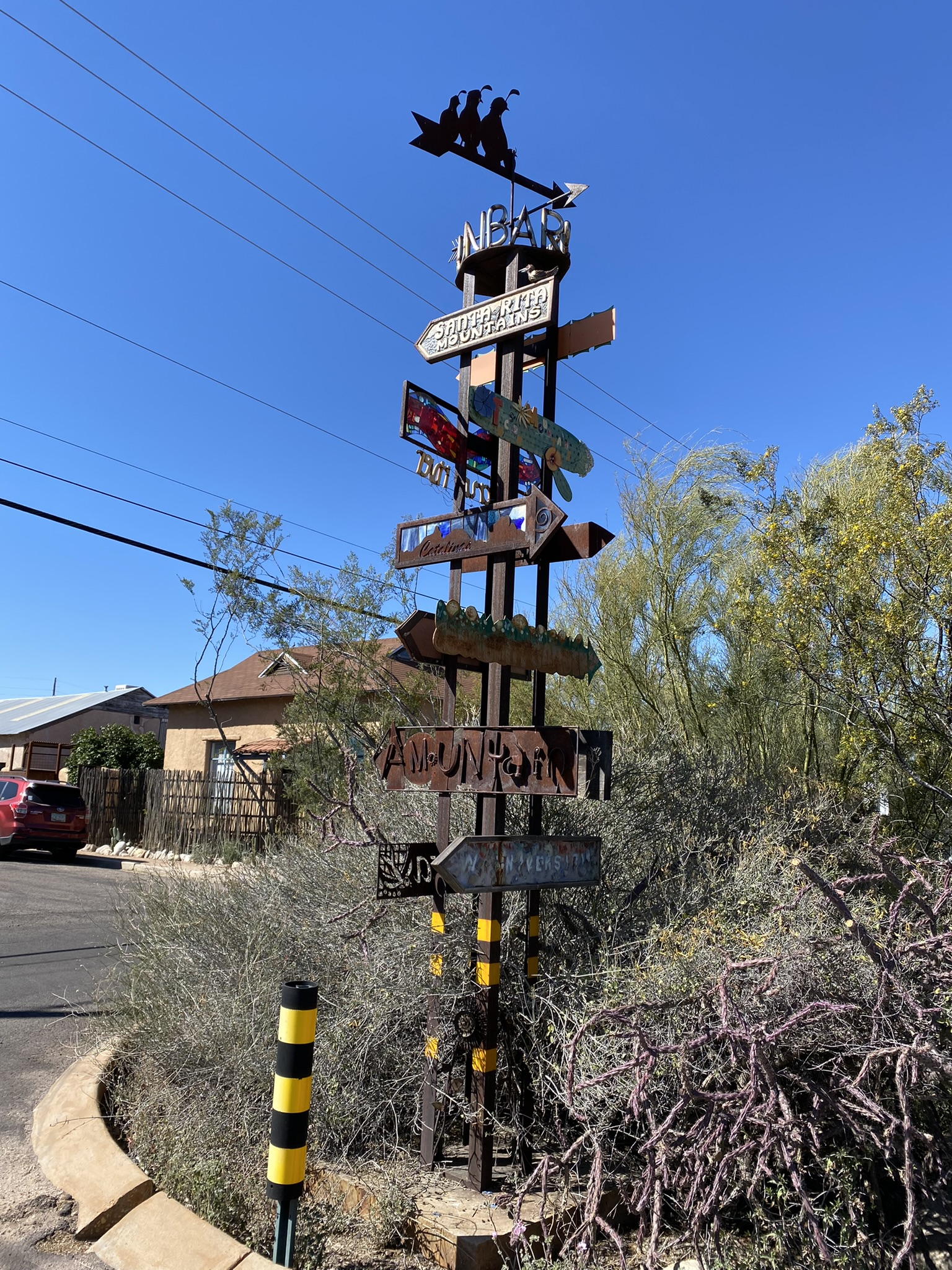
Traffic calming roundabout and rainwater-harvesting infrastructure in Tucson, Arizona

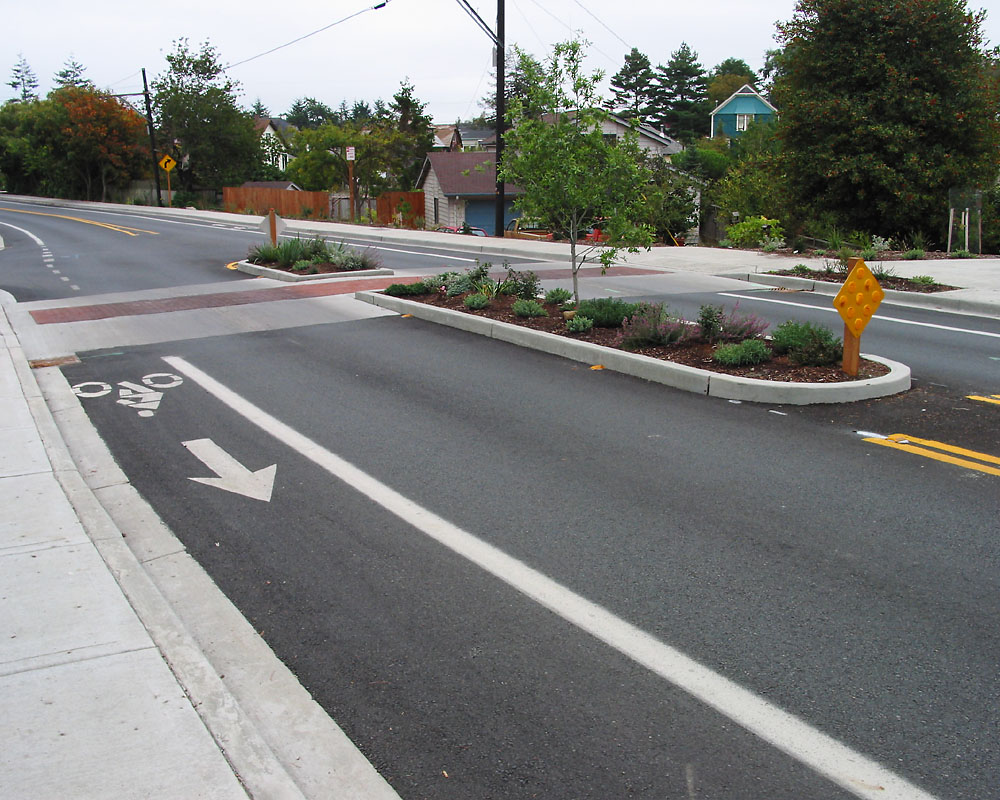
Median island with a raised mid-block pedestrian crossing

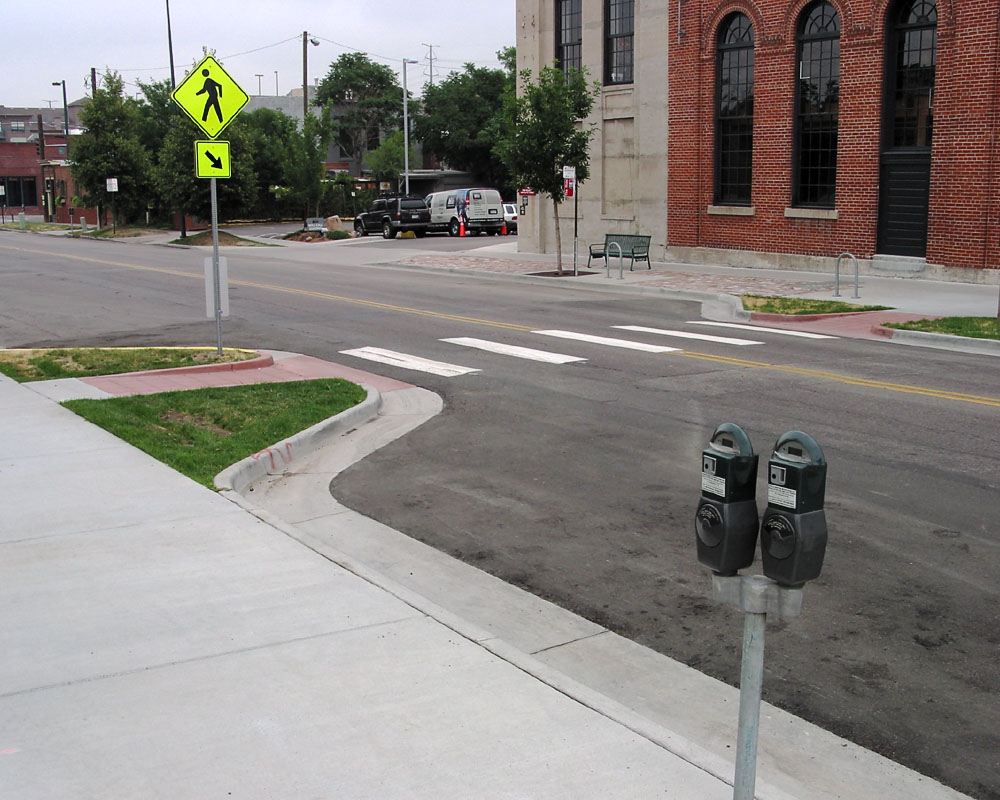
Curb extension at a mid-block pedestrian crossing

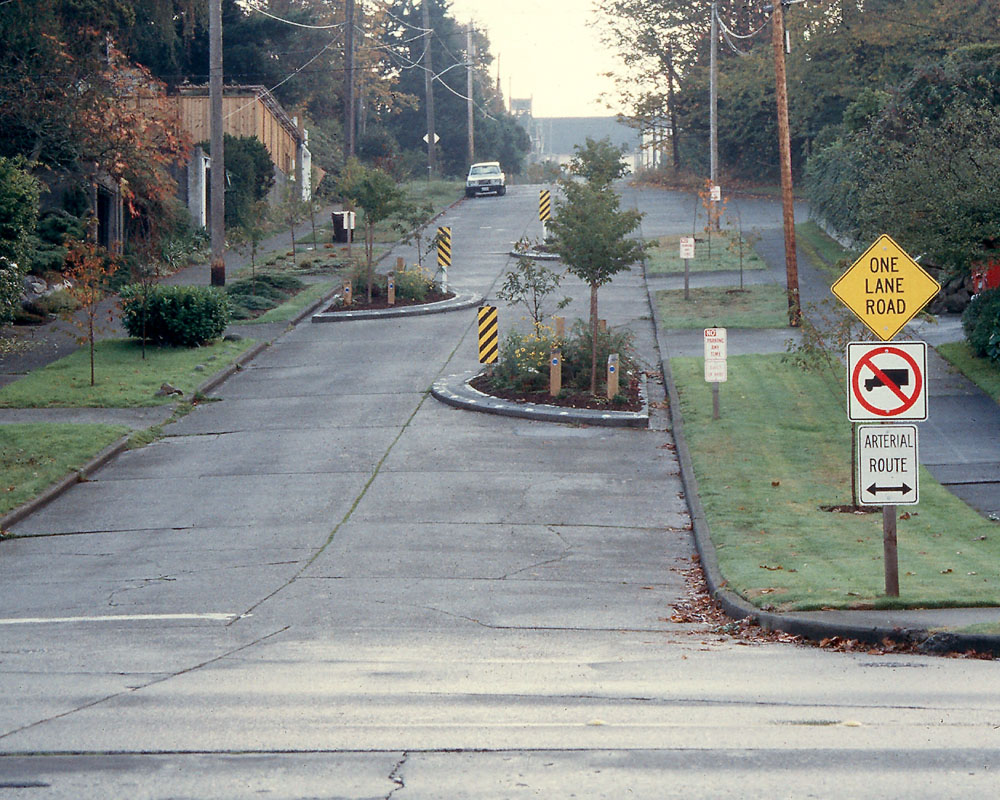
Chicane on a one-lane road

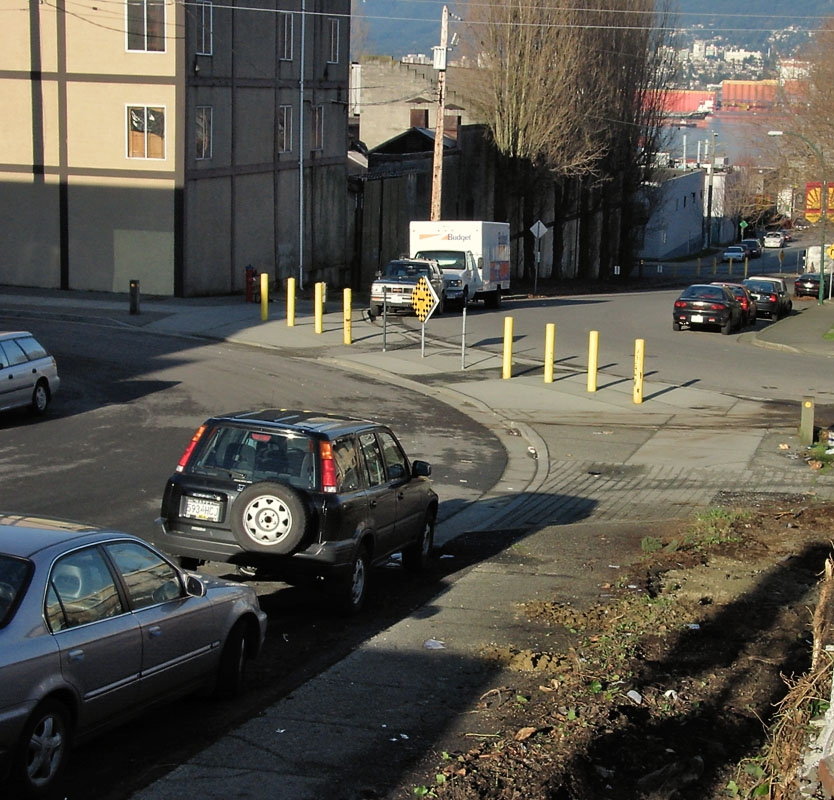
A diverter replaces a crossroads with two curves, making the street better for local traffic while redirecting through traffic

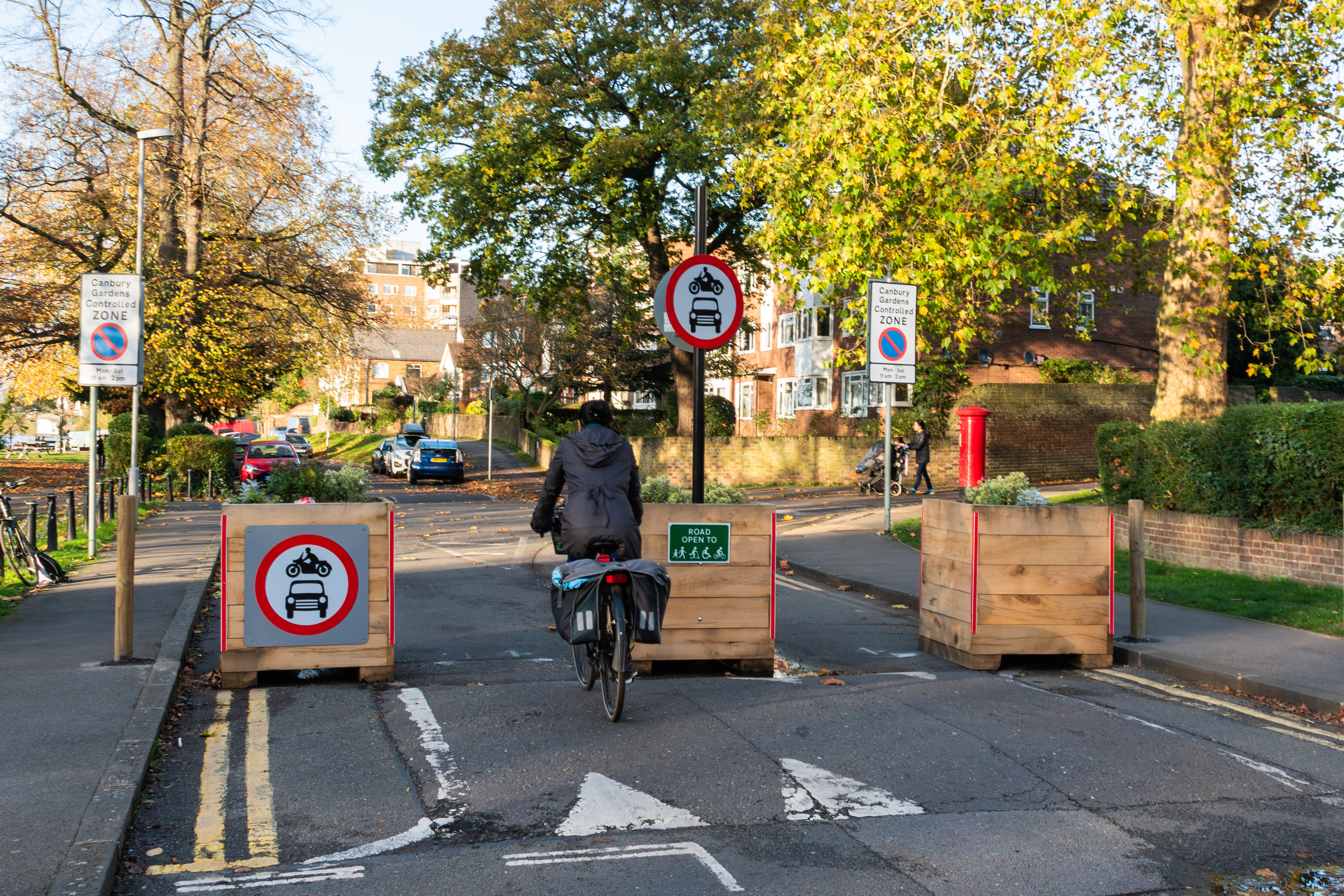
Modal filter as part of a trial LTN in Kingston, London. The spacing encourages cars to reroute while allowing small vehicles like bikes to pass through

Horizontal deflection traffic calming measures cause a lateral shift in the travel pattern of vehicles. This shift forces motorists to slow down in order to comfortably navigate the measure. This is often done by narrowing traffic lanes. Such measures include:

- Bollards to restrict road width
- Curb extensions (also called bulbouts) narrow the width of the roadway at pedestrian crossings
- Chokers are curb extensions that narrow roadways to a single lane at certain points
- Chicanes, which create a horizontal deflection that causes vehicles to slow as they would for a curve.
- Roundabouts and traffic circles provide another source of horizontal deflection especially when integrated within intersecting roads.

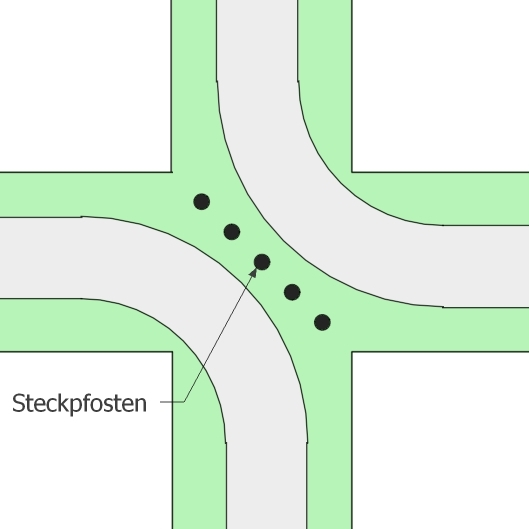
Diagram of an intersection divided by a median diverter which sometimes also functions as a modal filter

- Road diets remove a lane from the street. For example, allowing parking on one or both sides of a street, or introducing bicycle lanes to reduce the number of driving lanes.
- Pedestrian refuges or small islands or median strips in the middle of the street can help reduce lane widths and allow for pedestrians to cross the street more safely.
- Converting one-way streets into two-way streets forces opposing traffic into close proximity, which requires more careful driving.
- Modal filters to prevent vehicle traffic into a residential area.
- Converting an intersection into a cul-de-sac or dead end.
- Boom barrier, restricting through traffic to authorised vehicles only.
- Closing of streets to create pedestrian zones.

=== Vertical deflection ===
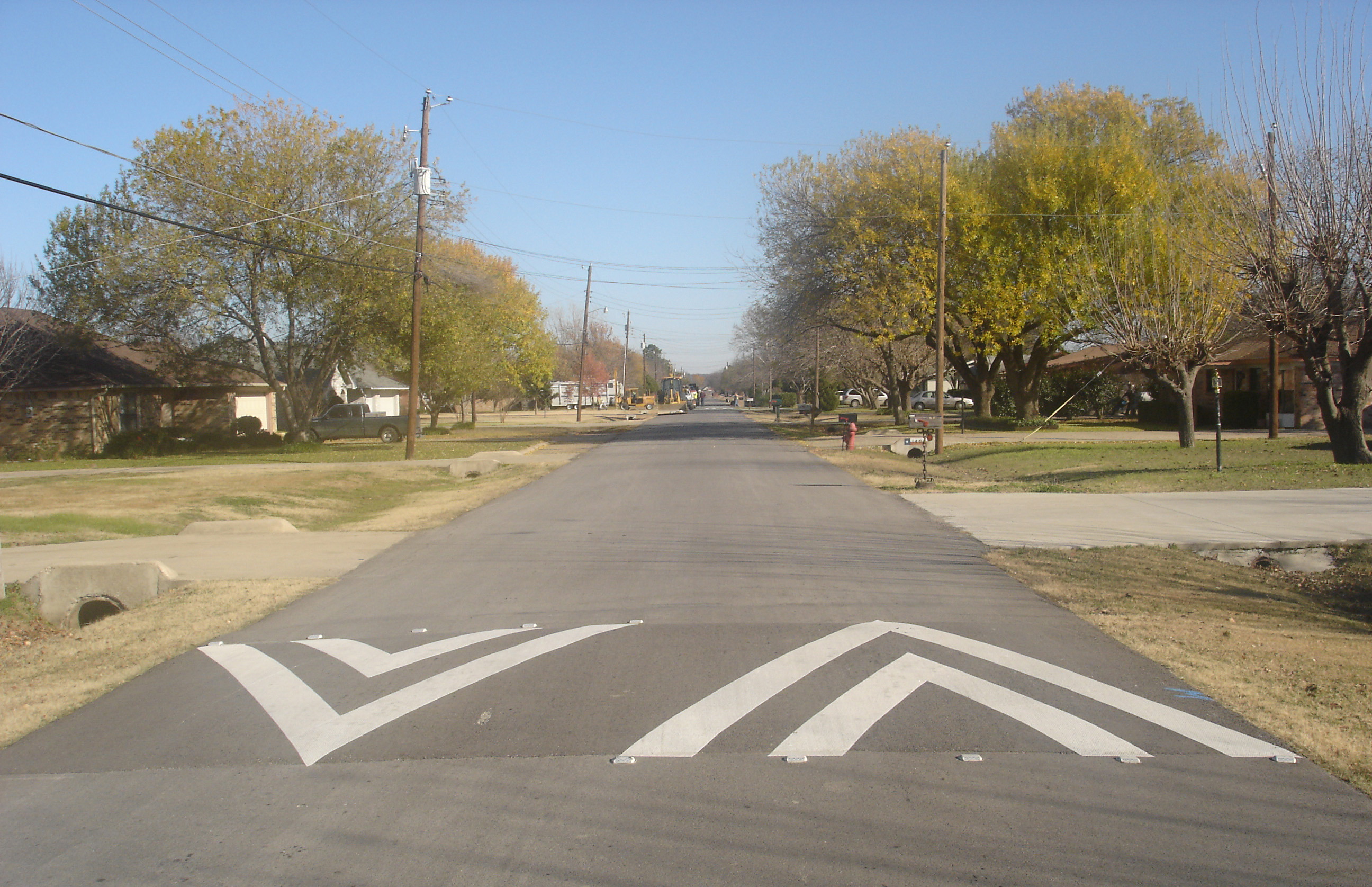
Speed hump made of asphalt

Vertical deflection traffic calming measures cause a vertical upward movement of the vehicle. The change in the height of the roadway forces the motorist to slow down in order to maintain an acceptable level of comfort. Sic measures include:

- Speed bumps
- Speed humps, parabolic devices that are less aggressive than speed bumps.
- Speed cushions, two or three small speed humps sitting in a line across the road that slow cars down but allows wider emergency vehicles to straddle them so as not to slow emergency response time.
- Speed tables, long flat-topped speed humps that slow cars more gradually than humps.
- Raised pedestrian crossings and zebra crossings, which act as speed tables, often situated at junctions.
- Raised intersections, like raised pedestrian crossings, act as speed tables.
- Speed dips, sunken instead of raised (often seen as double dips in cycleways in The Netherlands).
- Rumble strips, when placed perpendicular to traffic in the travel lane (rather than placed between lanes parallel to traffic) produce unpleasant sounds and vibration when crossed, encouraging slower speeds.

=== Non-physical measures ===
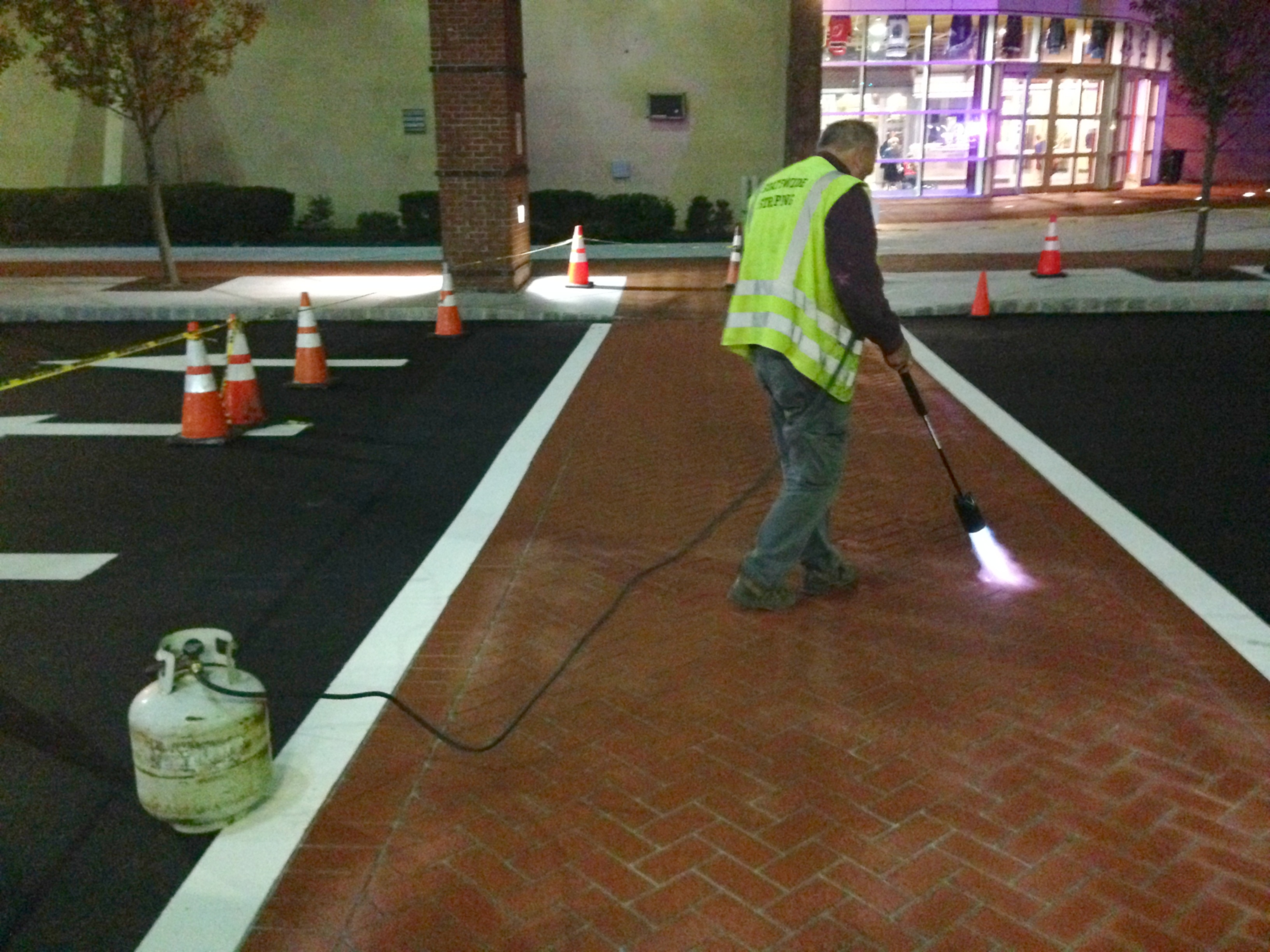
Construction of polymer cement overlay to change asphalt to brick texture and colour to indicate a high-traffic pedestrian crossing

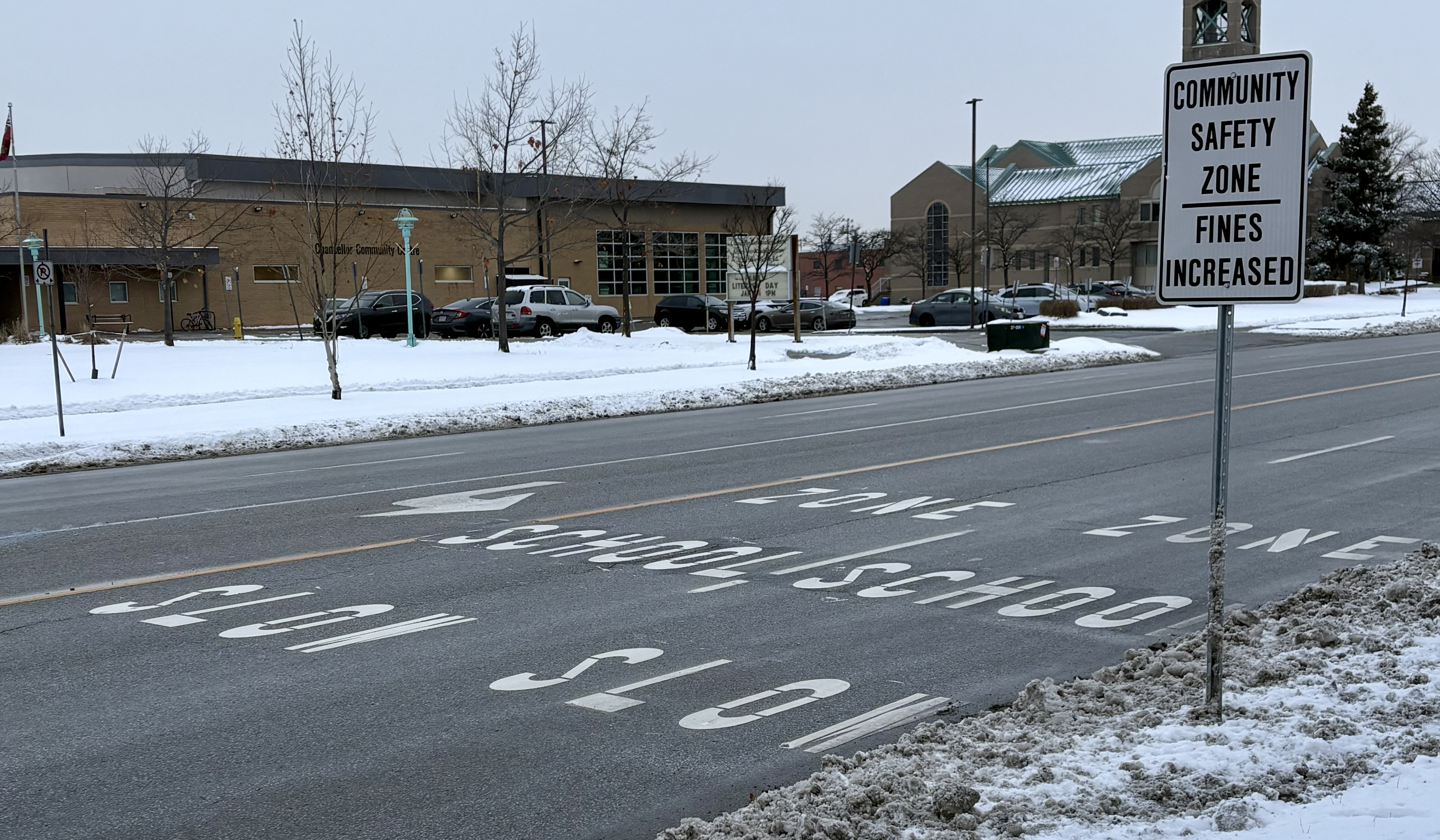
Slow school zone road surface marking in Vaughan, Ontario

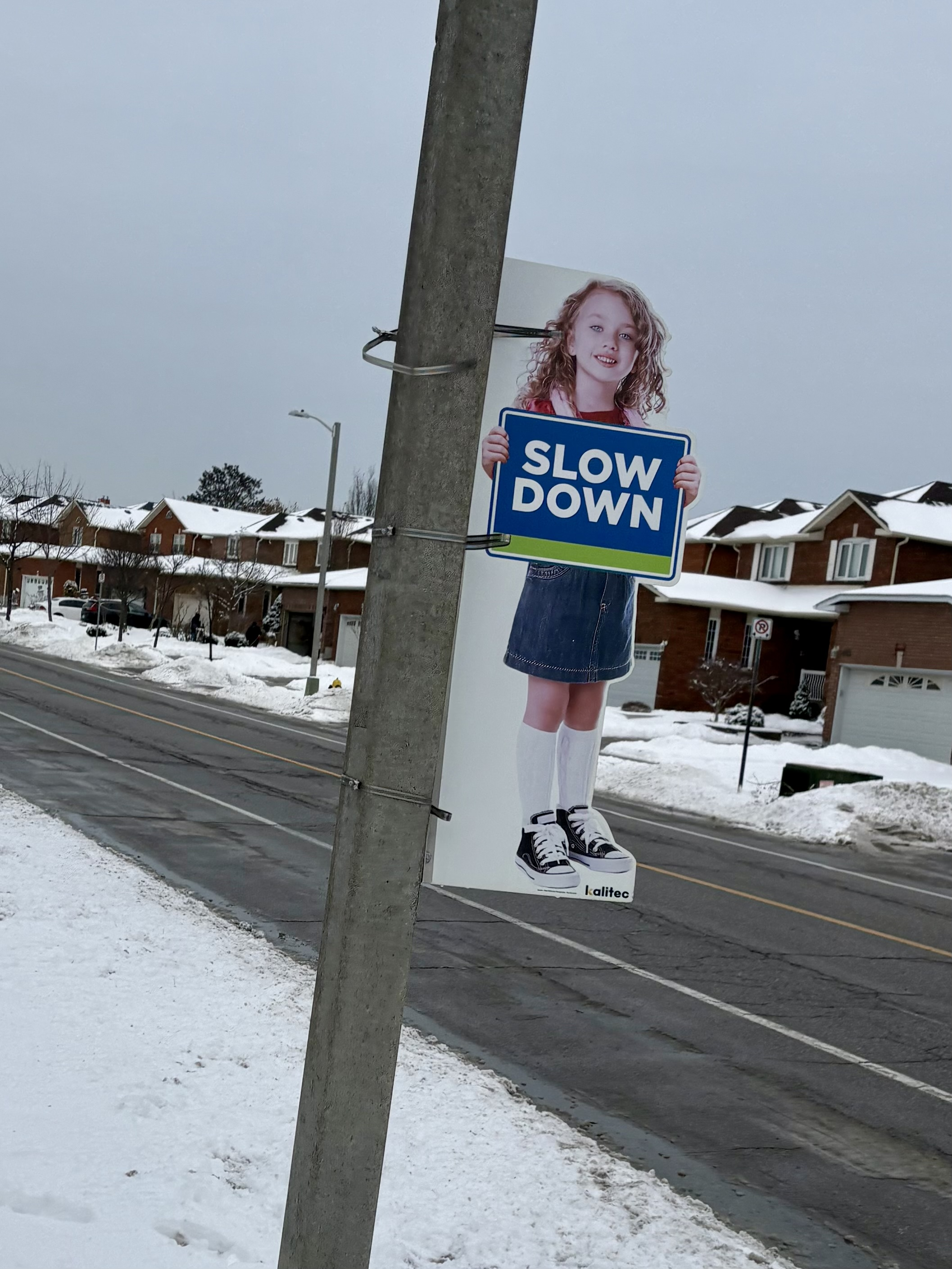
Slow down warning sign in Vaughan, Ontario

- Road surface markings that narrow traffic lanes or write messages on the road such as "school zone" or "slow down".
- Changing the surface material or texture (for example, the selective use of brick, cobblestone, or polymer cement overlay). Changes in texture may also include changes in color to highlight to drivers that they are in a pedestrian-centric zone.
- Radar speed sign
- Warning sign

=== Implementation strategies ===
There are primarily two implementation options for the creation of traffic calming measure: capital reconstruction versus operational changes.

- Capital reconstruction is rebuilding a street, which may involve moving infrastructure (such as sewers, water lines, electrical equipment) and adjusting the location, size and path of the roadway. Typically, capital reconstruction involves years of planning and design, and millions of dollars of investment.
- Operational changes to a road have to do with more short-term changes that typically implement minor adjustments within the existing curbline or that do not require rebuilding the road. These treatments range from a very temporary use of safety cones or other safety-approved traffic management devices, such as flexible bollards, that test a traffic-calming initiative for a few days to longer-term operational changes that may include restriping a street, which is best to plan around any routine maintenance resurfacing.

=== Enforcement and education measures ===
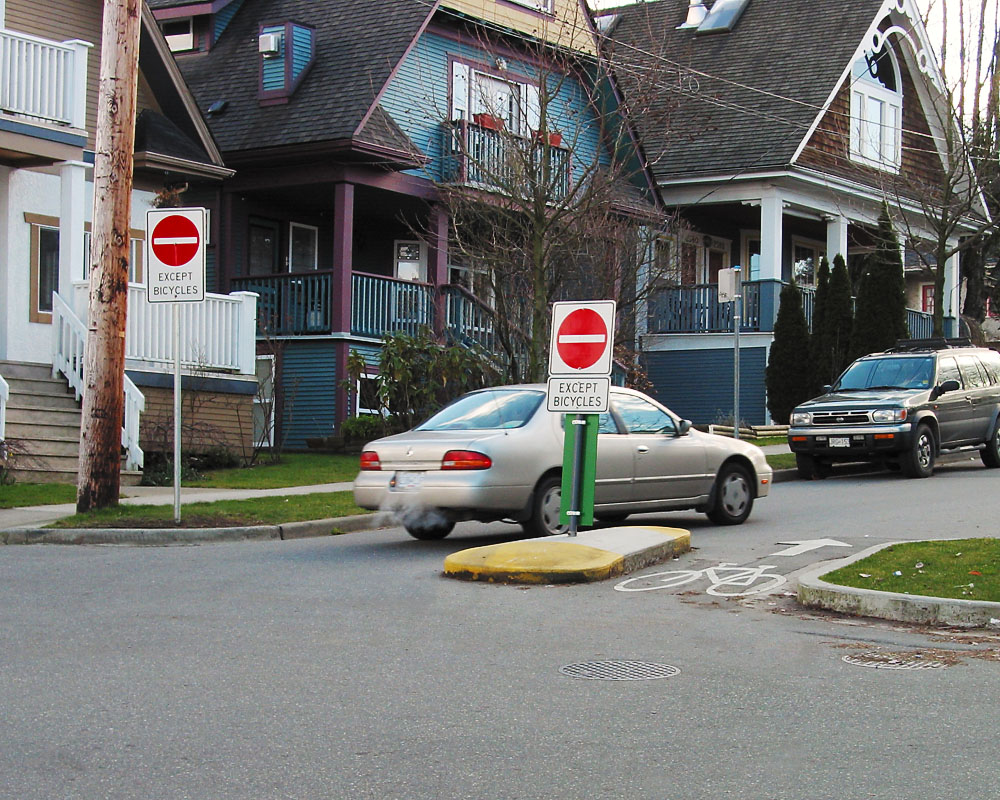
A motorist disregards a directional closure (a two-lane roadway with one terminus converted to one-way access)

Enforcement and education measures for traffic calming include:

- Reducing speed limits near institutions such as schools and hospitals (see below)
- Vehicle activated signs and radar speed feedback signs, signs which react with a message if they detect a vehicle exceeding a pre-determined speed.
- Embedded pavement flashing-light systems which react to pedestrian presence at crossings to signal drivers and increase awareness.
- Watchman, traffic calming system

==== Speed limits ====
Speed reduction has traditionally been attempted by the introduction of statutory speed limits. Traffic speeds of 30 km/h (20 mph) and lower are said to be more desirable on urban roads with mixed traffic. The Austrian city of Graz, which has achieved steady growth in cycling, has applied 30 km/h limits to 75% its streets since 1994. Zones where speeds are set at 30 km/h (or 20 mph) are preferred by some as they are found to be effective at reducing crashes and increasing community cohesion. Speed limits which are set below the speed that most motorists perceive to be reasonable for the given road require additional measures to improve compliance. Attempts to improve speed limit observance are usually by either education, enforcement or road engineering. "Education" can mean publicity campaigns or targeted road user training.

Speed limit enforcement techniques include: direct police action, automated systems such as speed cameras or vehicle activated signs or traffic lights triggered by traffic exceeding a preset speed threshold. One cycling expert argues for placing direct restrictions on motor-vehicle speed and acceleration performance. An EU report on promoting walking and cycling specifies as one of its top measures comprehensive camera-based speed control using mainly movable equipment at unexpected spots. The Netherlands has an estimated 1,500 speed/red-light camera installations and has set a target for 30 km/h limits on 70% of urban roads. The UK has more than 6,000 speed cameras, which took more than £100 million in fines in 2006/07.

== Examples around the world ==
=== Europe ===
Not Just Bikes compares traffic calming in the Netherlands and Canada (2020).

Traffic calming has been successfully used for decades in cities across Europe. For example, a living street (sometimes known as home zones or by the Dutch word woonerf, as the concept originated in the Netherlands) towards the end of the 1960s, initially in Delft, is a street in which the needs of car drivers are secondary to the needs of other road users; traffic calming principles are integrated into their design. From the Netherlands, the concept spread rapidly to Germany, starting in North Rhine-Westphalia in 1976, and had become very widespread by the early 1980s. The earliest documented use of the term 'traffic calming' as the translation of the German Verkehrsberuhigung was by Carmen Hass-Klau in 1985. Ideas and techniques also spread to the UK towards the end of the 1980s, and practice there was advocated particularly by the academics such as Carmen Hass-Klau and Tim Pharaoh, in the guidelines published by Devon County Council (of which he was the principal author).

The Netherlands, in 1999, had over 6000 woonerven where cyclists and pedestrians have legal priority over cars and where a motorised "walking speed" limit applies. However, UK and Irish traffic calming schemes, particularly involving road narrowings and pinch points, are viewed by some as extremely hostile and have been implicated directly in death and injury to cyclists and pedestrians.

The town of Hilden in Germany has achieved a rate of 24% trips made by bicycle, partly by employing various traffic calming measures such as widespread 32 kilometres per hour (20 mph) zones, bicycle priority roads, and raised platform speed tables for cycle crossings.

In the United Kingdom, Low Traffic Neighbourhoods incorporate traffic calming and Modal filters for filtered permeability. In 2020, some LTNs were introduced with emergency funding from the government, in response to the COVID-19 pandemic. A study found that people living in LTNs in Waltham Forest became less likely to own a car and were more likely to walk or cycle.

School Streets are another UK scheme which involves part-time restrictions on motor vehicles during school pick up and drop off times.

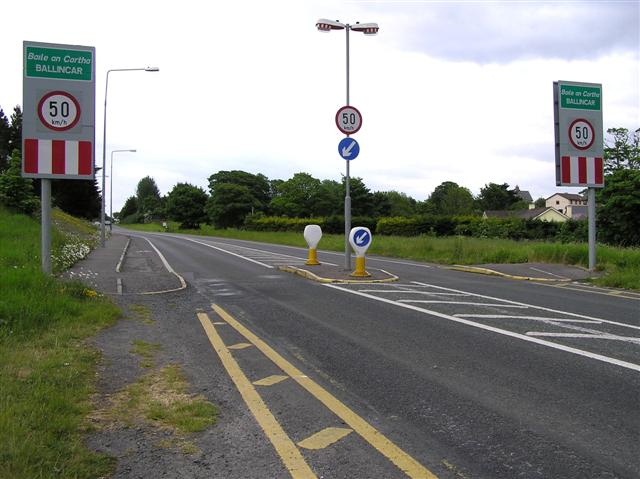
A typical traffic calming gateway in Ireland, marking the transition from rural road to built-up area

In Ireland, traffic calming schemes have been implemented on national roads since 1993, typically on those with a hard shoulder, on the approach to towns and villages where the speed limit is reduced from 100 km/h to 50 or 60 km/h. This is done by reducing the width of the hard shoulder and the carriageway, various landscaping and installation of 'gateways' in order to reduce the driver's field of view, which results in a reduction of their speed. A gateway marks the transition from high-speed to low-speed road and may feature a pavement, cycle lane, central island (where the road is sufficiently wide enough) or all three, and is accompanied with town/village entrance and speed limit signs as well as bollards and a lamppost in the island.

An evaluation of 91 traffic calming schemes implemented between 1997 and 2002 showed that they were successful in reducing road collisions, the number of which decreased by 13%. The number of fatal collisions was reduced by 52%.

=== North America ===
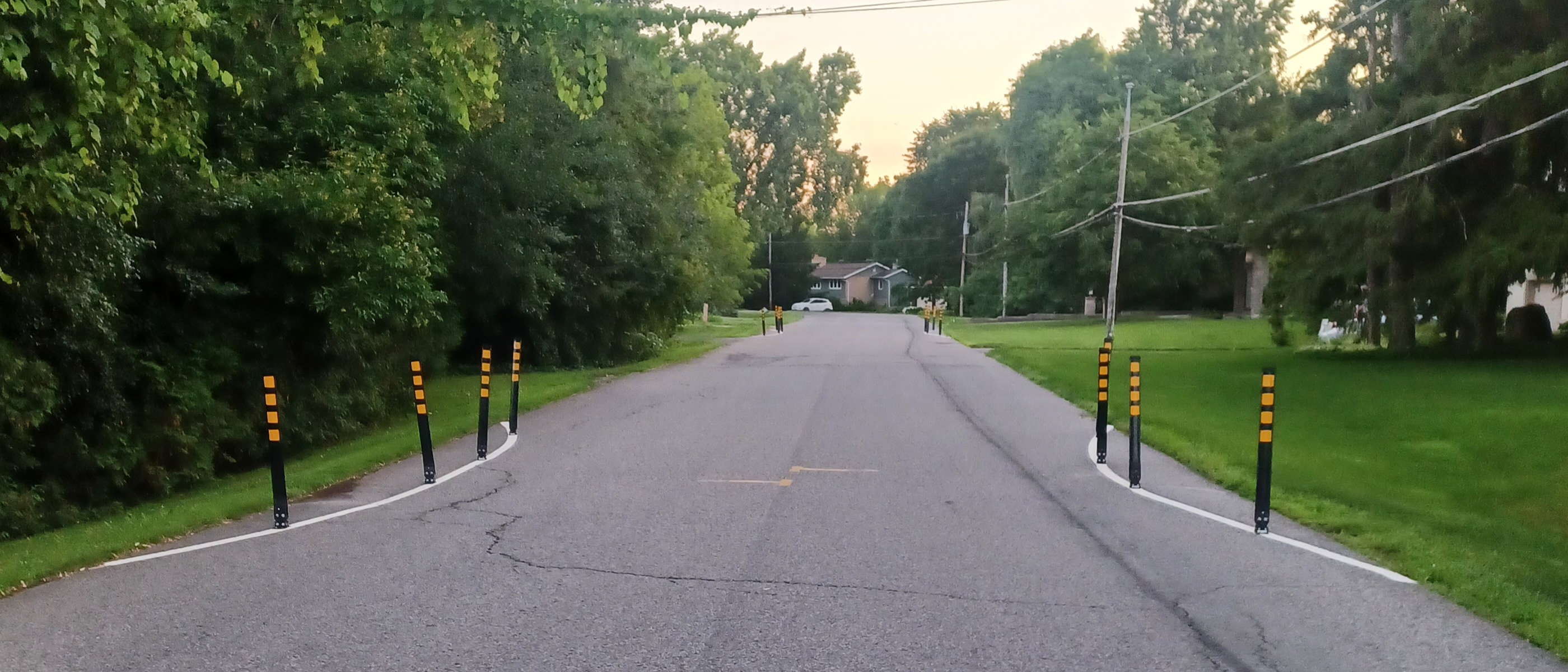
A suburban residential street in Ottawa, Canada narrowed with painted "bumpers" and bollards to encourage lower driving speeds and discourage passing.

By 2017, San Francisco's Vision Zero program, which heavily features traffic calming, had reduced fatalities by 33%.

In New York City, corridor safety upgrades produced about 6% reduction in pedestrian crash incidence compared with similar corridors that were not upgraded. These improvements were implemented as part of the city's Vision Zero policy.. A reduction in speed limits also produced a positive effect, according to a 2020 study..

A 2018 study found that traffic calming measures in Portland, Oregon reduced excessive speeds, reduced daily traffic volume by 16% and increased home prices by 1%.

In 2025, Ontario Premier Doug Ford struck the section of the Highway Traffic Act that permitted automated speed enforcement. Instead, the government launched a $210 million road safety initiatives fund for municipalities to implement traffic calming measures.

=== Japan ===
Various forms of traffic calming are used in Japanese cities, particularly in large cities like Tokyo and Yokohama. Tokyo's narrow streets force automobiles and pedestrians to be close to one another; a common traffic calming technique in Tokyo is to change the surface material and/or texture of the shoulder of narrow roads, which helps define the boundary between cars and pedestrians, while allowing cars to use the shoulder to pass each other after yielding to pedestrians.

== Reception and evaluation ==
A Cochrane Review of studies found that there is evidence to demonstrate the efficacy of traffic calming measures in reducing traffic-related injuries and may even reduce deaths. However, the review found that more evidence is needed to demonstrate its efficacy in low income countries.

== See also ==
- Assured clear distance ahead
- Hierarchy of roads
- Low emission zone
- Pedestrian
- Road traffic control
- Self-explaining road
- Shared space
- Street hierarchy
- Sustainable transportation
- Rainbow crossing
- Pavement art
