= SPECS (speed camera) =

Average speed measuring camera system

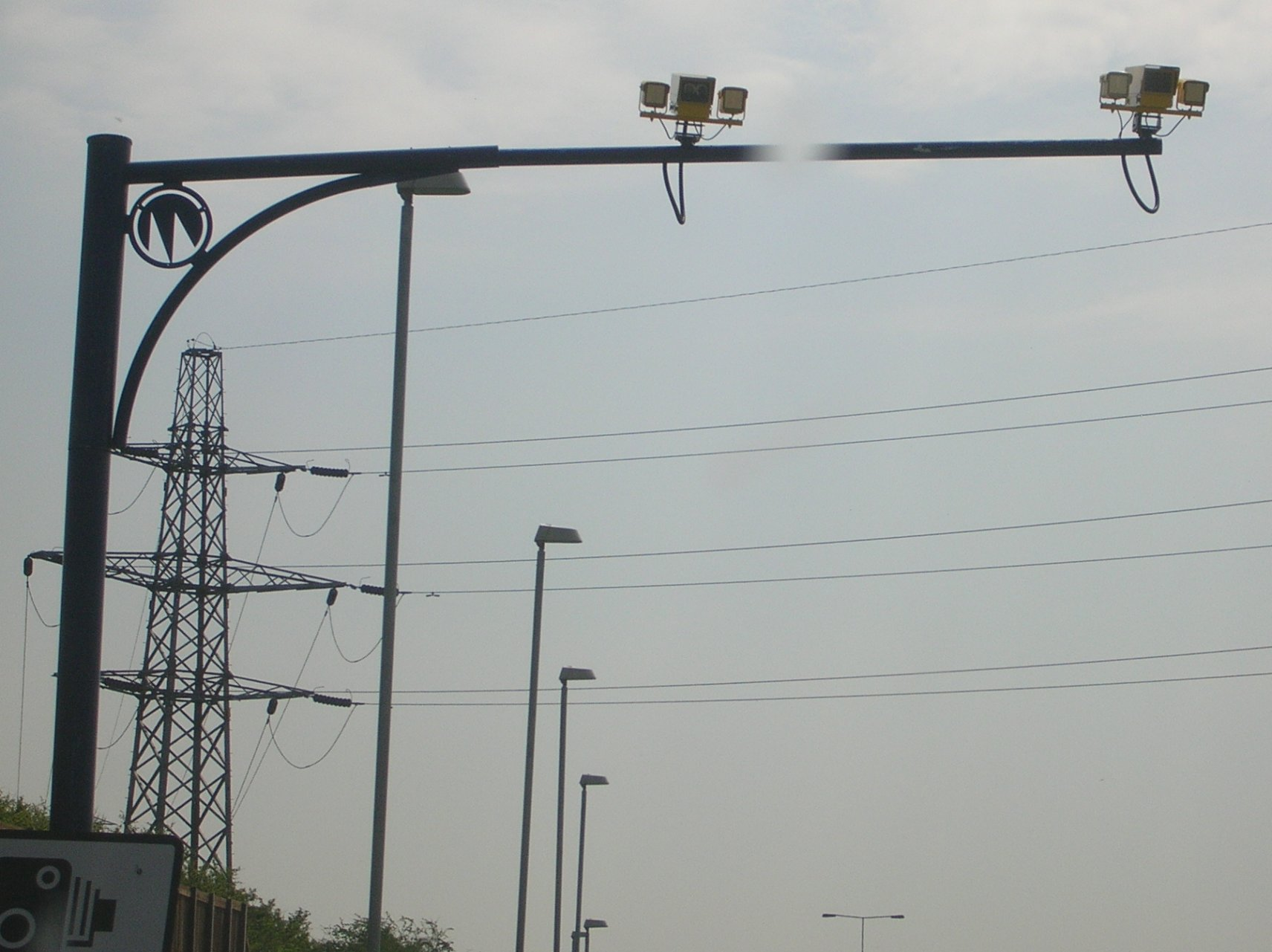
SPECS cameras installed above the motorway

SPECS is an average speed measuring speed camera system introduced in 1999. It is one of the systems used for speed limit enforcement in the United Kingdom.

SPECS was originally manufactured by Speed Check Services Limited, from which it takes its name. The company was acquired by Vysionics in 2010, which in turn was acquired by Jenoptik in 2014.

== About SPECS cameras ==
SPECS cameras operate as sets of two or more cameras installed along a fixed route that can be from 75 metres (246 feet). Maximum distance was 10 km with SPECS1 (SVDD) but with the event of SPECS3 became unlimited although legal requirements limit the maximum practical distance. They work by using an automatic number plate recognition (ANPR) system to record a vehicle's front number plate at each fixed camera site. As the distance is known between these sites, the average speed can be calculated by dividing this by the time taken to travel between two points. The cameras use infrared photography, allowing them to operate both day and night.

There is a popular misconception that the Home Office has approved the SPECS system for single-lane use only. The cameras can only operate in pairs, where each pair only monitors one lane of a multi lane road. So in theory, one can escape detection by changing lanes between the entry and exit cameras. In reality, two or more sets of pairs of cameras are arranged to have overlapping areas of monitoring; since the driver cannot tell which cameras are 'entry' and which are 'exit', as they look identical, they cannot tell where to change lane to escape detection. With the introduction of SPECS3-Vector cameras were able to monitor more than one lane including traffic going in different directions as long as the orientation of a pair of cameras is the same.

The system has another deficiency in that since the cameras only read the front number plate of a vehicle, speeding motorcycles escape detection because they have no front number plate to read. This issue went away with the introduction of SPECS3 which can be set up to be forward facing as well as rear facing allowing motorcyclists to be caught. A prime example of a site setup for this is the A537 Cat-and-Fiddle site.

The cameras are often painted yellow and have been given the nickname "yellow vultures".

== Incidents ==
In February 2007 a letter bomb exploded at the accountants of Speed Check Services Limited in what was believed to be an attack on organisations related to DNA testing and road transport.

== Similar systems in other countries ==
Similar systems are being used in other countries:

- Trajectcontrole (The Netherlands, first country to use "fixed average speed check")
- Odcinkowy pomiar prędkości (Poland)
- Section Control (Austria)
- Tutor or Safety Tutor (Italy)
- Safe-T-Cam (Australia)
- Trajectcontrole/Radar tronçon (Belgium)
- ITSv (Integrated Time headway and Speed violation System) (Iran)

== See also ==
- Safety Camera Partnership
- TASCAR
- Traffic enforcement camera
