= Radar speed sign =

Interactive traffic sign

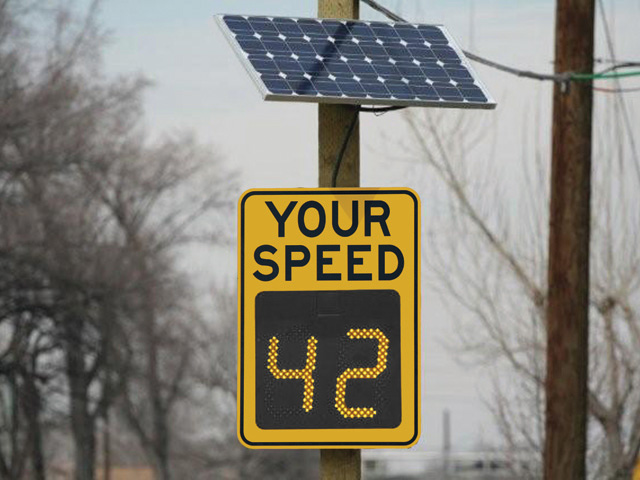
Standard radar speed sign with block letters. Pictured with solar panel.

A radar speed sign or speed feedback sign is an interactive sign comprising a speed-measuring device (e.g. a loop detector or radar) and a message sign generally constructed of a series of LEDs, which displays vehicle speed of approaching motorists. The purpose of radar speed signs is to slow cars down by making drivers aware when they are driving at speeds above the posted limits. They are used as a traffic calming device in addition to or instead of physical devices such as speed bumps and rumble strips.

The devices have been referred to by a wide variety of names, a partial list of which follows: driver feedback sign, radar signs, Vehicle Activated Sign (UK), changeable message sign, Your Speed sign, radar feedback sign, speed radar sign, radar speed display, speed feedback sign, traffic calming sign, speed display board, dynamic speed display (DSDS) or variable message sign.

== Usage ==
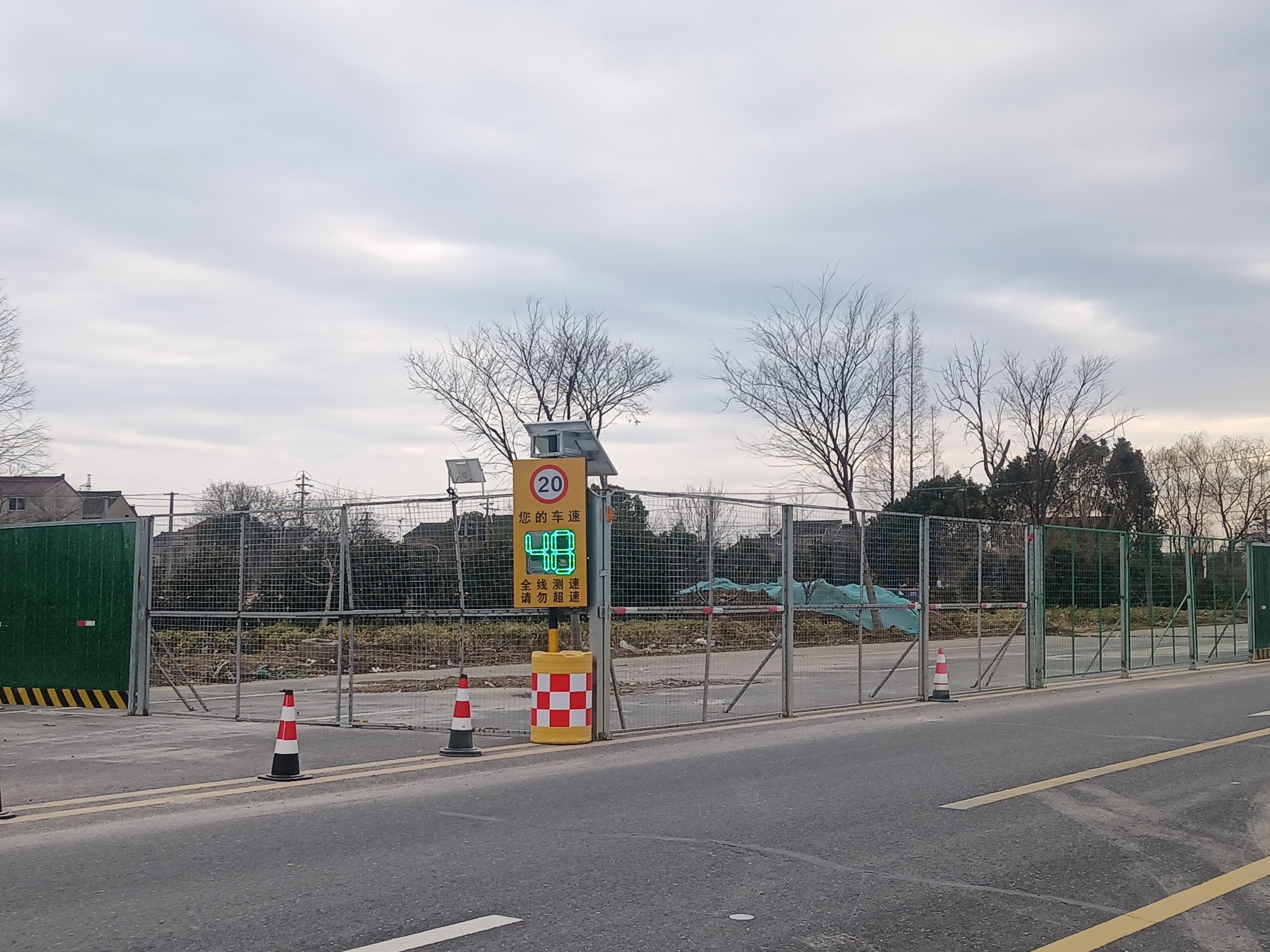
Radar speed sign at construction site, used to monitor the speed of passing vehicles

Radar speed signs are often used in school zones, sometimes in conjunction with Safe Routes to School programs, in construction zones, or on busy residential roads. Some college and corporate campuses use radar speed signs to slow traffic as well. Many plants are using these signs to monitor forklifts and other type trucks. There are steps to placing a radar speed sign.

Speed display signs are sometimes used in conjunction with physical traffic calming solutions. They are also used on streets that cities do not want to put physical measures on either because of snow concerns or traffic volume. Often, cities will use these signs to test streets to determine the need for further traffic calming.

== Features and types ==
Signs are available in a range of costs with a variety of different features. Manufacturers of radar speed signs abound, ranging in style and features from a basic inexpensive sign to more sophisticated signs with myriad features to help analyze data and improve results. Pole mounted signs that combine speed display with variable message capability are often used in school zones, eliminating the trailer's "footprint".

Standard signs have stationary block letters that display the words "your speed". More advanced models include variable messages such as Your Speed, Speed Limit, and Slow Down, which can be programmed based on motorist speed.

Many manufacturers offer optional solar power, which allows the signs to be powered via solar energy with rechargeable batteries included for nighttime operation. Many users (especially in Northern climates) have reported problems with solar powered signs failing to work during winter months, and with their internal batteries failing prematurely. However, newer proprietary power efficient methods are available as well as cold weather batteries.

Some of the features offered on the higher end signs include focused viewing systems to avoid distractions for motorists in other lanes, vehicle data collection, programmable software that allows you to determine sign behavior such as blanking/blinking speed thresholds and stealth modes, and/or access via portable devices such as Bluetooth or PDAs. Many signs offer tampering and vandalism prevention measures built into the signs, such as Lexan and BashPlates. Some signs offer a flashing light to warn motorists who exceed a designated speed. However, many state, county and city traffic engineers in the USA specify only signs that meet the federal guidelines called MUTCD (Manual on Uniform Traffic Control Devices) which, due to safety reasons, eliminate certain distracting features like strobe lights and certain color messages. A Vermont state guideline is very specific and eliminates many features. See more about MUTCD below.

The first place to install an emotive radar speed sign, which displays a smile for drivers within the speed limit and a frown for those exceeding it, was Sussex County, Delaware . The Delaware Department of Transportation (DelDOT) installed the sign as part of a pilot program on Johnson Road. This is one of eleven such signs DelDOT plans to deploy across the state.

== Effectiveness ==
Studies conducted both in the UK and in the US have found radar speed signs to effectively slow traffic down. Although the overall speed reductions are generally less than those resulting from physical measures, the signs have the greatest effect on those drivers that are exceeding the posted speed, or traveling within speed transition zones.

One sample study undertaken along speed transition zones in Shelburne, Vermont measured vehicle speeds at three locations before and after the installation of radar speed signs, and found reductions in 85th percentile speed ranging from 3 to 6 mph. Another study conducted in Bellevue, Washington found that various types of radar speed signs installed in thirty-one locations resulted in 85th percentile speed reductions generally ranging from about 2-6 mph, with a few exceptions; Where four locations measured a reduction of less than 1 mph, and one other location had actually increased by 0.3 mph. However, another location had measured the maximum reduction of 6.8 mph. In spite of the small average speed reduction, the city considers the signs to be successful because they have resulted in a dramatic reduction in the speed of those vehicles that were traveling in excess of the limit, while not interfering with the progress of the majority of traffic that is already traveling at or below the speed limit.

The signs were most effective on streets where vehicles were driving more than 10 mph above the posted speed limit. In the Bellevue study, streets where signs were installed continued to experience speed reductions even two years after the signs were installed.

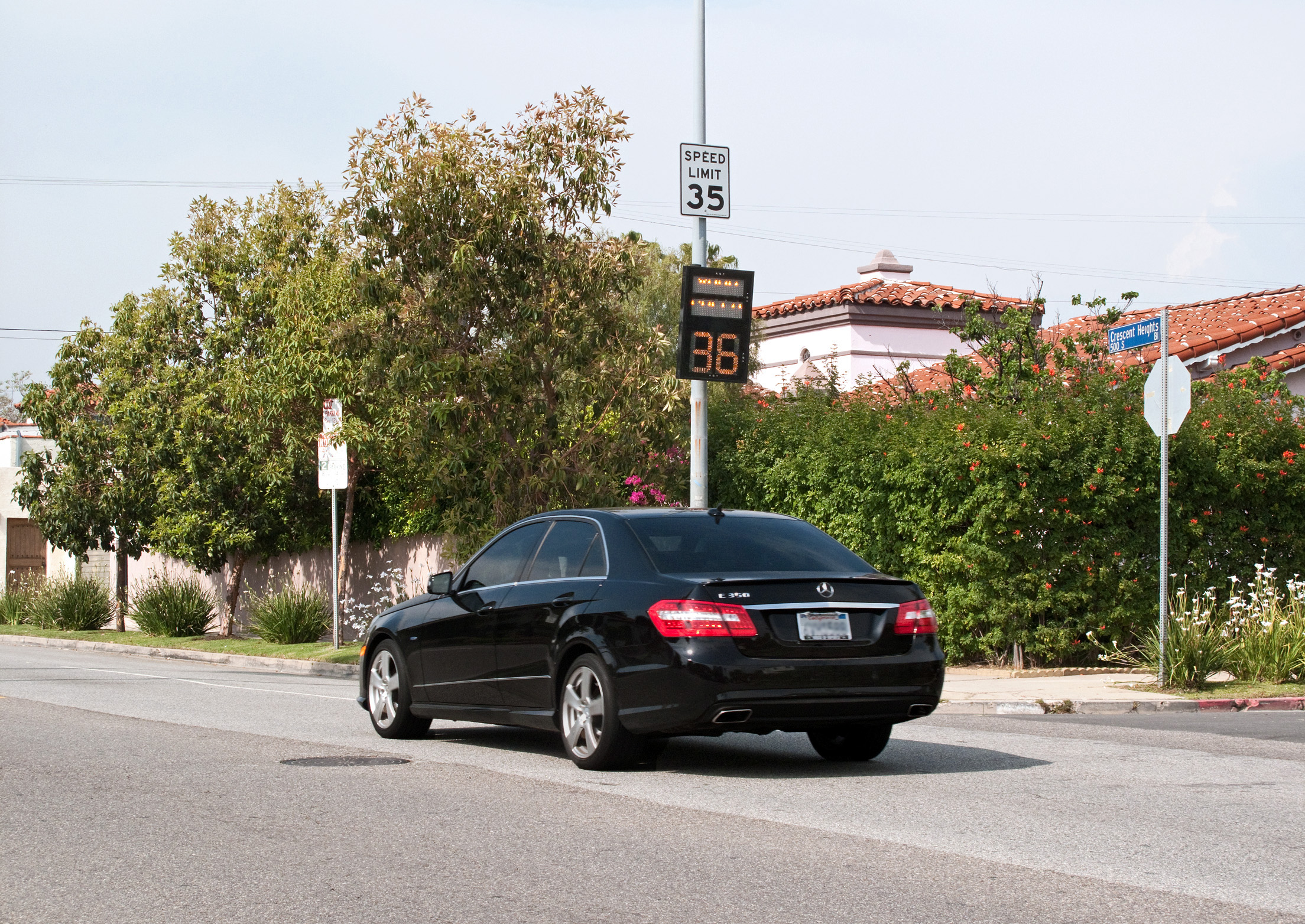
A radar speed sign (below a "Speed Limit 35" sign) in Los Angeles, California. The radar sign reads "36"

== U.S. federal standards ==
The MUTCD (Manual on Uniform Traffic Control Devices), a standards document issued by the Federal Highway Administration (FHWA) of the United States Department of Transportation (USDOT), has specified standards regarding sign size and letter height for Speed Limit Signs (an R2-1 in the parlance) under Section 2B.13. This is the only section of the current revision of the MUTCD to mention the use of a radar speed sign and refers to them as “changeable message signs”, a term normally associated with work zone safety and the like. Subsequent the release of the 2009 edition of the MUTCD, an official interpretation regarding the use of radar speed feedback signs cited (in Section 2L.04) that "changeable message signs shall not include advertising, animation, rapid flashing, dissolving, exploding, scrolling, or other dynamic elements" to enhance the conspicuity of highway signs.

Section 2B.13 (excerpt) “A changeable message sign that changes the speed limit for traffic and ambient conditions may be installed provided that the appropriate speed limit is shown at the proper times.

A changeable message sign that displays to approaching drivers the speed at which they are traveling may be installed in conjunction with a Speed Limit sign.

Guidance: If a changeable message sign displaying approach speeds is installed, the legend YOUR SPEED XX (MPH) or such similar legend should be shown. The color of the changeable message legend should be a yellow legend on a black background or the reverse of these colors.”

The first paragraph allows for the use of VSL Signs (Variable Speed Limit signs), the second for use of a Speed Feedback Sign. The third is “Guidance”, not regulation, concerning the content and color of the “legend”, typically the static signage surrounding the electronic display.

Two other states have been much more specific in their directive regarding Speed Feedback Signs, California and Minnesota. California's most recent comments were somewhat more specific as to what they expected. In it they expressed specifics regarding color of the numerals, some technical specifics regarding the LEDs used and expressly prohibit the signs from being used for any VSL purpose, which several signs on the market do. They also call for a White on Black plaque rarely if ever found in the market. White on black is usually reserved for night time speed limit signs. In addition the document offers guidance on character shape, eschewing the common 7-segment style for a more graphic character resembling the fonts (D or E Series Highway Fonts) used on R2-1 signs.

“California MUTCD Page 2B-13 (FHWA’s MUTCD 2003 Revision 1, as amended for use in California)

Vehicle Speed Feedback Signs Option: A Vehicle Speed Feedback sign that displays to approaching drivers the speed at which they are traveling may be installed in conjunction with a Speed Limit (R2-1) sign.

Standard: If a Vehicle Speed Feedback sign displaying approach speeds is installed, the legend shall be YOUR SPEED XX. The numerals displaying the speed shall be white, yellow, yellow-green or amber color on black background. When activated, lights shall be steady-burn conforming to the provisions of CVC Sections 21466 and 21466.5. Vehicle Speed Feedback signs shall not alternatively be operated as variable speed limit signs.

Guidance: To the degree practical, numerals for displaying approach speeds should be similar font and size as numerals on the corresponding Speed Limit (R2-1) sign.

Option: When used, the Vehicle Speed Feedback sign may be mounted on either a separate support or on the same support as the Speed Limit (R2-1) sign. In lieu of lights, legend may be retro-reflective film for flip-disk systems. The legend YOUR SPEED may be white on black plaque located above the changeable speed display.

Support: Driver comprehension may improve when the Vehicle Speed Feedback Sign is mounted on the same support below the Speed Limit (R2-1) sign. Vehicle Speed Feedback Signs are appropriate for use with advisory speed signs and with temporary signs in temporary traffic control zones.”

In Minnesota's case their Department of Transportation got very specific. Too exhaustive to repeat here, it nevertheless addresses specific static sign color based on application, flash rates and activation speeds for violator alerts etc. In addition, a Minimum Product Specification is attached to the document.

It is widely believed in the industry that the new revision of the Federal MUTCD will much more specifically address these devices and will most likely grandfather in non-compliant existing signs for some reasonable period of time.

== Radar Speed Sign Manufacturers ==
- Viatronics, Corp. (Finland)
- Photonplay Systems LTD. (CA)
- Carmanah Technologies Corporation (CAN)
- Elan Cité (DBA Elan City) (FRA)
- Fortel Traffic, Inc. (USA)
- Intuitive Control Systems, LLC (DBA All Traffic Solutions) (USA)
- Kustom Signals, Inc. (USA)
- Logix ITS (DBA Traffic Logix) (CAN)
- Monitor Systems, Inc. (USA)
- MPD, Inc. (DBA MPH Industries, Inc.) (USA)
- Pandora Technologies Limited (UK)
- Radarsign, LLC (USA)
- RTC Manufacturing (USA)
- Sierzega Elektronik GmbH (AUS)
- Applied Concepts, Inc. (DBA Stalker Radar) (USA)
- TraffiCalm Systems (USA)
- Unipart Dorman (UK)
- Auto Mate Systems Ltd. (UK)

== See also ==
- Glossary of road transport terms
- Speed Hump
- Traffic Calming
- Variable Message Sign
- Vehicle-activated sign
