= Lightguard Systems =

American technology corporation

LightGuard Systems
- Company type: Corporation
- Founded: 1992
- Headquarters: Santa Rosa, California, United States
- Key people: Michael Harrison, Founder
- Website: www.lightguardsystems.com

Lightguard Systems is a California traffic safety device company known for developing “Smart Crosswalk”, the earliest pedestrian safety system to use embedded pavement flashing-light systems.

== Founding ==
Lightguard Systems Inc. produces Lighted Crosswalk Systems invented by its founder, Michael Harrison. Inspired by a series of fatal pedestrian traffic incidents in Santa Rosa, California in 1991, Harrison developed the first LightGuard system as a safety aid for installation at pedestrian crossings and started LightGuard Systems to produce them. A commercial pilot, Harrison was inspired by the flashing lights used as runway beacon lights. He applied this principle for crosswalk visibility and founded LightGuard Systems to produce and install systems based on the technology he developed.

== Lighted Crosswalk System ==
“The experimental ‘Crosswalk Warning System’, also known as the ‘LightGuard System’ or the ‘Santa Rosa Lights’ consists of warning lights housed in a unit which is installed on the pavement adjacent to a marked crosswalk. The lights reflect out toward the oncoming traffic to warn drivers of a pedestrian’s presence.”

Developed with an embedded pavement flashing-light system, the LightGuard system includes flashing lights and other visual cues to influence driver behavior near pedestrian crossings. Systems may be manually operated or activated automatically through electronic sensors. LightGuard’s Smart Crosswalk and other Embedded pavement flashing-light systems can be powered from the electrical grid or by on-site solar power sources.

== Safety ==
Reports cite that studies conducted at specific locations where no traffic signal was present have shown lighted crosswalk systems like those produced by LightGuard and other manufacturers increased driver awareness of crosswalks, increasing pedestrian safety. One study calculated an increase in driver awareness of 20-95%.

== Installations ==
LightGuard has installed its eponymous system in locations throughout the US, including at the Miami International Airport and others at San Francisco City Hall, as well as sites in Mexico.

== Location ==
The company has offices in Sonoma County, California
