= Embedded pavement flashing-light system =

Crosswalk signal

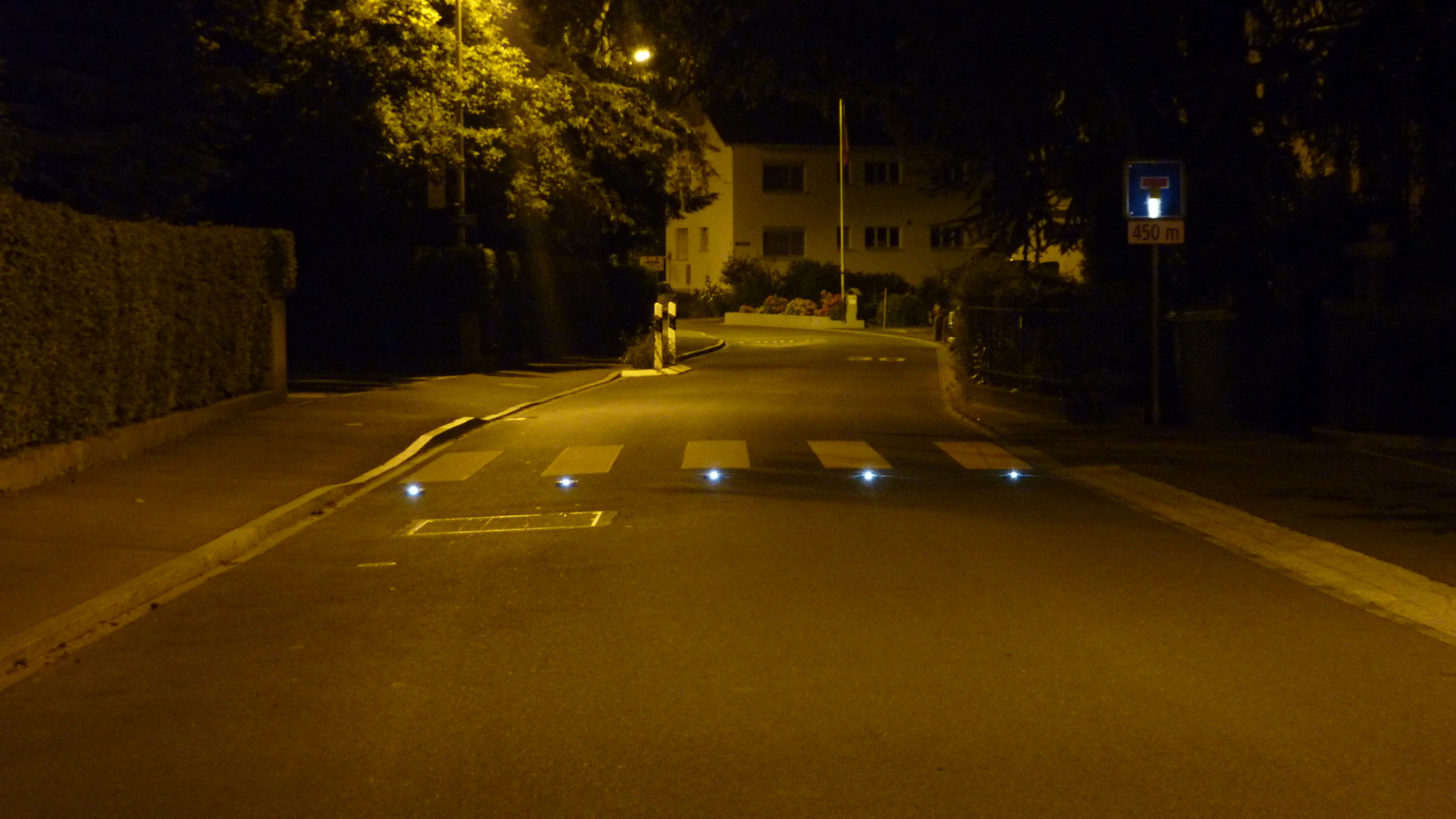
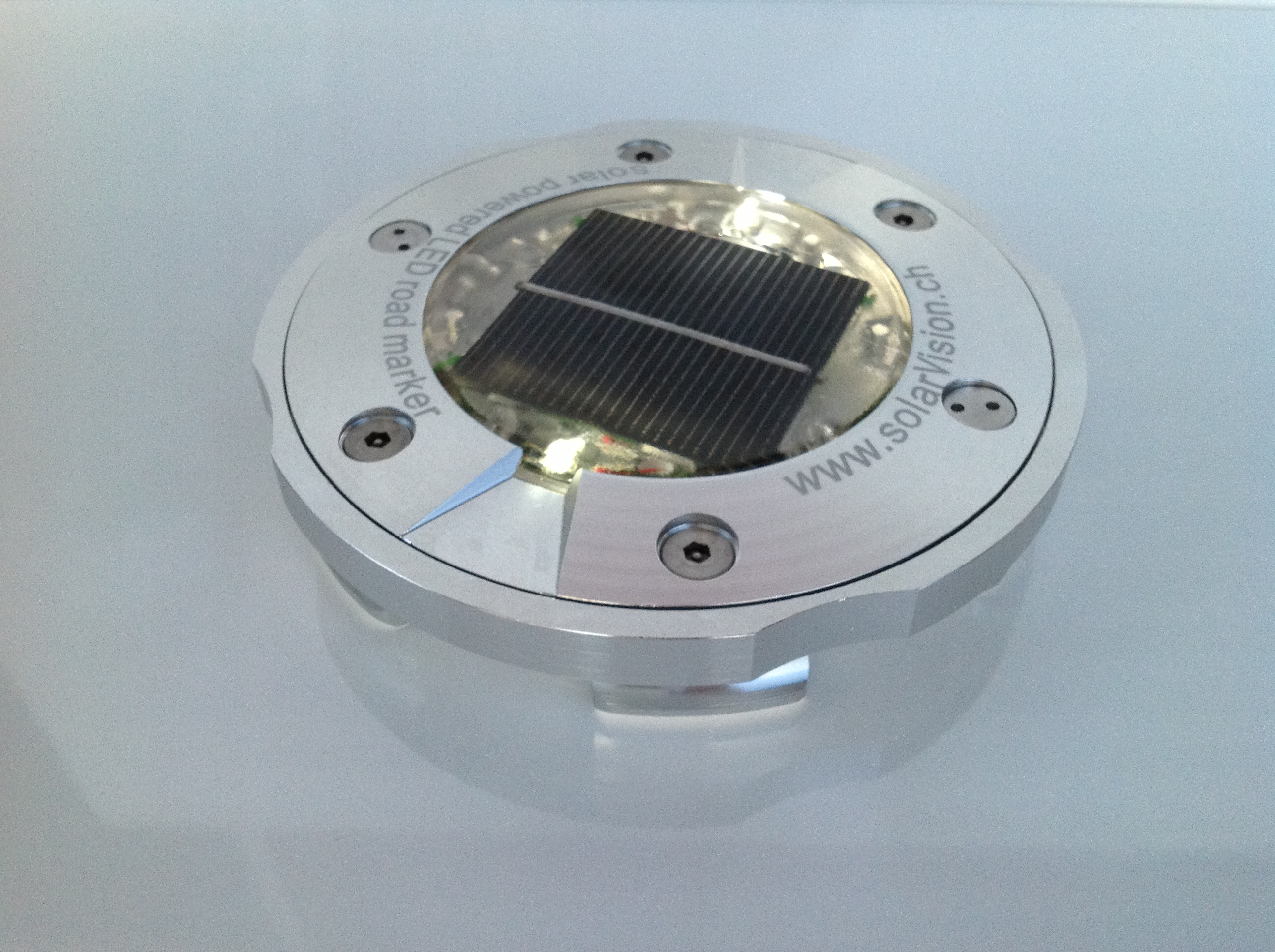
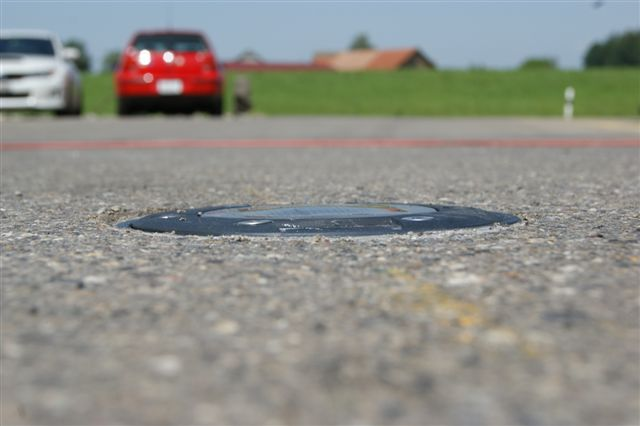
Photos of embedded flashing-light system

An embedded flashing-light system, or an in-pavement flashing-light system, is a traffic safety device installed at pedestrian crossings or intersections to enhance driver awareness of pedestrians or traffic signals. These systems typically consist of LED lights embedded within the road surface, positioned to face oncoming traffic or pedestrians.

When in use, the embedded lights flash or illuminate in unison, alerting drivers to the traffic light signal changes or pedestrians. These lights are synchronized with the traffic light system to enhance overall effectiveness, ensuring coordinated alerts for both pedestrian crossing times and signal changes. In certain areas, these systems constantly operate to delineate traffic lanes, providing continuous guidance to drivers.

== History ==
The concept for an embedded pavement flashing light system was conceived by pilot Michael Harrison in Santa Rosa, California, in 1992 after a friend was involved in a pedestrian accident. He based it on his experience with airport runway lights embedded in the pavement, Mr. Harrison went on to found Lightguard Systems.

== Types ==
There are two different types of embedded pavement flashing light systems, passive and active. These types differ in how the system is activated.

With a passive system, the pedestrian activates the device merely by walking up to the crosswalk. This is accomplished by using one of several motion detection devices. These include microwave, motion sensors, video detection, pressure plates, or a light trip beam. With an active system, the device is usually activated by a button that a pedestrian pushes to cross. These active systems are generally similar to lighted pedestrian signs at traffic intersections. Because many pedestrians may not realize that they need to press a button to activate the system, it is generally recommended to install a passive system.

== Effectiveness ==
Compared with other types of warning devices, the effectiveness of the embedded pavement flashing light system seems to be high. When approaching a crosswalk with an embedded pavement flashing light system, drivers are more apt to slow down and yield to pedestrians than when drivers approach a crosswalk with another type of lighted warning device. Also, compared to a crosswalk with no warning device, drivers are more likely to slow down and yield to pedestrians when the embedded pavement flashing light system is in place.
