= Parliamentary Advisory Council for Transport Safety =

The Parliamentary Advisory Council for Transport Safety (PACTS) is a registered charity. For much of its history, it was also an All-party parliamentary group of the UK parliament. In 2016, following changes to parliamentary rules, PACTS the charity was separated from the APPG and PACTS now provides the secretariat to the Transport Safety APPG. PACTS charitable objective is: To protect human life through the promotion of transport safety for the public benefit. Its annual accounts and trustees review of the year can be accessed via the Charity Commission’s website.

== History ==
The Parliamentary Advisory Council for Transport Safety (PACTS) was established in 1982 after a successful campaign by parliamentarians and transport safety experts to introduce compulsory seat belt wearing through the Transport Act 1981. The group recognised the need for an independent advisory body that could connect research, policy, and legislation. Members of both Houses of Parliament joined with safety professionals to create PACTS.

At first, PACTS focused on improving road safety, especially through work on seat belt and drink-driving laws. Over time it expanded its scope to cover all modes of transport, including road, rail, and air. During the 1980s and 1990s, PACTS contributed to key parliamentary debates and inquiries on transport safety and played a part in shaping reforms that improved rail safety after several serious incidents.

In 1991 PACTS became a registered charity and a company limited by guarantee, which strengthened its independent position. Since then, the organisation has been governed by a Board of Trustees who oversee its strategic direction and ensure its charitable objectives are met. It also became a founding member of the European Transport Safety Council and began working with international partners to promote evidence-based approaches to transport safety across Europe.

Over the following decades PACTS contributed to major advances in safety policy, vehicle design, and infrastructure. It has continued to promote research-led policymaking and has built a reputation for bridging the gap between academics, practitioners, and legislators.

Today PACTS supports the All-Party Parliamentary Group for Transport Safety and provides expert advice to members of Parliament advocating for legislative change to create a safe transport system. It remains the only UK organisation that addresses transport safety across all modes while remaining independent from political or commercial interests.

PACTS’ vision is for a transport system free from death and life-changing injury, in which all users feel safe. In line with international commitments such as the United Nations’ road safety targets, PACTS calls for a 50 percent reduction in road deaths in the UK by 2030 and continues to promote the Safe System across the transport sector.

== Membership ==
PACTS has an annual membership of over 150 organisations and individuals. To inform its work, it brings together expertise and knowledge from the public, private and professional sectors, comprising insurers, car manufacturers, police and emergency services, local authorities, research institutions and road user groups. It seeks to use this expertise to provide independent, research-based technical advice to Parliamentarians.

Members also provide technical expertise through a structure of working parties. These look at road user behaviour, vehicle design, the road environment, aviation and rail safety. Chaired by independent and respected experts in the field, these enable PACTS to maintain its current knowledge and understanding of the issues facing transport safety.

== Events ==
PACTS organises the prestigious annual Westminster Lecture on Transport Safety to help disseminate key research and knowledge about transport safety. The lecture highlights PACTS’ long-standing role in bringing together leading experts, policymakers, and practitioners to share insight and advance evidence-based safety policy.

As part of its educational work, it also organises two conferences a year, usually held in October and March. These offer an opportunity for practitioners and researchers to debate key research findings and to evaluate examples of current practice in transport safety. Recent conferences have covered driving while impaired, vehicle design innovations and aiming for zero.

== Europe ==
Recognising the importance of the European dimension in transport safety, PACTS was a co-founder of the European Transport Safety Council (ETSC) which is based in Brussels. This brings together representative organisations across the EU and occupies a similar position to PACTS in relation to the European Parliament and Commission. ETSC is a European (not EU) body and PACTS engagement is unaffected by brexit.

== Current work ==
PACTS undertakes a broad range of activities to influence and shape transport safety policy, research, and practice across the UK.

One of its most recent initiatives is “A world-leading strategy, promoting road harm reduction based on the Safe System”, published in September 2025, which calls for the UK to adopt bold cross-government commitments and a systems-based approach to reduce road harm. The strategy frames road safety as a central component of public health, economic efficiency, and social equity and underscores the importance of Safe System principles.

PACTS also promotes the Safe System in its ongoing work. This means recognising that human error is inevitable, and designing transport systems so that collisions do not result in death or serious injury. The organisation publishes guidance and commentary on implementing Safe System principles in roads, vehicles, speeds, post-crash response, and infrastructure.

In the area of new mobility, PACTS has engaged with e-scooter safety, producing expert commentary and evidence on how these emerging transport modes should be regulated and integrated safely into public space.

PACTS continues to advocate for renewed attention to seat belt use, underlining its status as one of the most effective life-saving measures, and calling for enhanced public policy, enforcement, education, and awareness.

All of these activities are complemented by PACTS’ regular role in producing research reports, briefings and consultation responses, and several active working parties. PACTS collaborates with government, industry, academia and third sector partners to translate evidence into policy and practice.
