= Safety camera partnership =

Local multi-agency partnership

A safety camera partnership (also casualty reduction partnership, safer roads partnership) is a local multi-agency partnership between local government, police authorities, Her Majesty's Courts Service, National Highways/Welsh Government, and the National Health Service within the United Kingdom. Their aim is to enforce speed limits and red traffic lights by the use of cameras.

They were initially established in 1999 as part of the National Safety Camera Scheme to enforce speed limits in the United Kingdom. Until April 2007, the partnerships were funded from penalties generated from the use of traffic enforcement cameras in each area, but subsequently time they have received road safety grants.

== Rationale ==
The stated objective was to reduce deaths and serious injury on the roads by reducing the level and severity of speeding and red light running through deterring, detecting and enforcement of speed and red light offences using but not limited to camera technology and driver education programmes.

The programme was started as part of the UK government's Road Safety Strategy that set targets of:

- 40% reduction in deaths and serious injuries by 2010 (compared to the average of 1994–8)
- 50% reduction in deaths and serious injuries of children.

The reported casualty statistics 2009 showed that the 2009 figures for deaths and serious injuries were 44% lower than the 1994-8 average and deaths and serious injuries of children down by 61% on the 1994-8 average. A similar level of 10-year casualty reduction had been consistently achieved over each of the previous sixteen years, with a previous high of 43% in 1993 and the lowest recent figure being 38% in 2006.

== History ==
The safety camera programme was announced with a press release in December 1999. Eight trial areas were announced which would begin a roll-out of a number of Safety Cameras. These areas were Cleveland, Essex, Lincolnshire, Northamptonshire, Nottingham, South Wales, Strathclyde and Thames Valley.

The announcement was in part the result of a report commissioned by the UK Department for Transport (DfT) to look at the differing effects of various strategies related to the deployment of speed cameras. The main finding of the report was that camera deployment can reduce drivers' speeds markedly and that cameras on the survey roads were perceived to be reasonably effective.

The eight initial implementations began on 1 April 2000. The cameras were mainly to be placed in locations where there had been a significant number of casualties as a result of road accidents. One novelty in the partnerships was that the revenue raised by the cameras would be ring-fenced for investment back into the running and maintenance of the original cameras and investment in more cameras. In part this was a response to allegations that such cameras were being placed for revenue generation and not for safety reasons. From the start the partnerships were controversial with strong opinions both for and against the cameras. In December 2001 new regulations enforced a code of visibility for the cameras in order that they were always clearly seen by motorists. As of April 2006 there were thirty eight safety camera partnerships in England and Wales covering forty-one police force areas out of a total of forty-three (Durham and North Yorkshire are the exceptions). Similar arrangements exist in Scotland and Northern Ireland.

As the cameras became more widespread the issue became more contentious politically. In particular motoring bodies began to question the effectiveness of speed cameras as a means for accident prevention. There were also constitutional concerns about the membership of the Courts Service and the payments made to that body contrary to the fundamental principle of Natural Justice: nemo iudex in causa sua. This created a demand for research showing whether or not the cameras were, in practice, effective at reducing deaths and injuries from road accidents, and to address the unlawful payments. Four independent evaluation reports were commissioned by the DfT to address this.

Since April 2007 however, an annual specific (although not ring fenced) 'road safety grant' which was no longer related to the number of penalties issued locally was given directly to the local authorities with a responsibility for road safety who were free to choose whether or not to re-invest this in their partnership.

During 2007 a total of 1.26 million fixed penalties were issued, which was down 23% from the previous year.
