= Vehicle-activated sign =

Road sign triggered by traffic

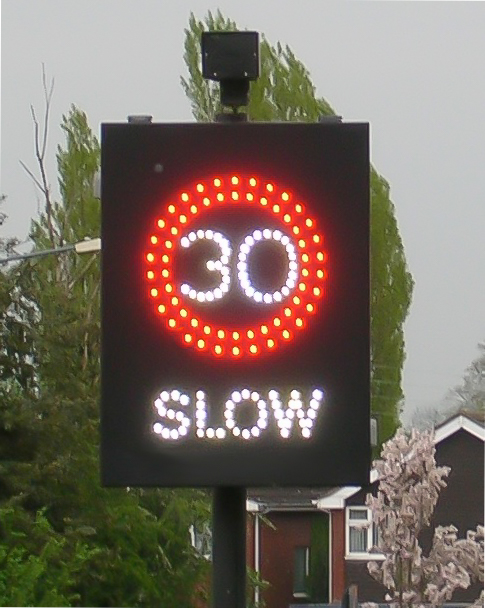
Vehicle activated speed enforcing sign

Vehicle activated sign (VAS) is a generic term for a type of road traffic sign which displays a message conditional upon the presence, or speed, of a road vehicle. The devices are deployed on roadsides like regular traffic signs in various countries. They are intended to help drivers by alerting them and drawing attention to danger or other undesirable situation.

== Sign types ==
=== Speed enforcing ===
These signs activate if an approaching vehicle is detected to be exceeding a preset speed threshold. The speed limit and/or a warning message will illuminate on the sign to remind the driver/rider to slow down.

Another variation of VAS displays the speed of any passing vehicle. If the vehicle is moving faster than the speed limit the number will flash, or be displayed in an alternate colour. Other signs also flash alternately between a number indicating the speed and an emoticon. A Smiley face is displayed if the vehicle is moving below the speed limit, while a sad face is displayed when the limit is being exceeded. This kind of VAS is widely deployed in the Netherlands and Belgium.

=== Hazard warning ===
These signs are installed on the approaches to hazards such as bends and junctions. If triggered they may display a warning message and/or an image of the appropriate road sign (sharp bend, junction, overheight warning, etc.).

Sydney, Australia has implemented a unique low-clearance hazard warning using a curtain of water directly in the path of the vehicle. "When a truck gets too close ... a curtain of water starts flowing and a stop sign is projected onto it. The result is a warning that's so in-your-face that not only do the trucks stop, but so do all of the cars around it."

=== Sign design ===
Vehicle activated signs used on the public highways are normally designed to mirror the standard road traffic signs and in the UK to the TSR&GD standards, these signs should also be designed to EN12966:2014 to ensure the signs are fit for use on the public highways.

== Sign effectiveness ==
In a 2002 study conducted by TRL for the UK Department for Transport one of the conclusions was that vehicle activated signs appear to be very effective in reducing speeds; in particular, they are capable of reducing the number of drivers who exceed the speed limit and who contribute disproportionately to the accident risk, without the need for enforcement such as speed cameras.
