= HADECS =

Type of speed camera used in England

HADECS or Highways Agency Digital Enforcement and Compliance System is a type of speed camera on roads in England, operated by National Highways.

== History ==
The HADECS camera was introduced in 2012.

HADECS cameras have been introduced to enforce variable speed limits (VSLs) as found commonly on managed motorways - hard shoulder running in peak traffic flows.

=== Hadecs 3 ===
Hadecs 3 was introduced on the M25 in Kent in April 2014, becoming active on 22 October 2014.

HADECS3
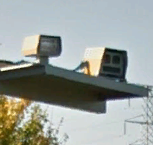
- Redflex HADECS3 on M42
- Manufacturer: Redflex Holdings

Two manufacturers currently hold Home Office Type Approval to supply equipment for the HADECS 3 system, those being Redflex Holdings and Dynniq.
