= Vision Zero (New York City) =

2014 traffic-safety program

Vision Zero is a program that was passed into law by New York City Mayor Bill de Blasio in 2014. It was sponsored by former council member David G. Greenfield. Its purpose is to eliminate all traffic deaths and serious injuries on New York City streets by 2024. On January 15, 2014, Mayor de Blasio announced the launch of Vision Zero in New York City, based on a similar program of the same name that was implemented in Sweden. The original Swedish theory hypothesizes that pedestrian deaths are not as much "accidents" as they are a failure of street design. Traffic-related injuries and crashes in New York City increased from 2014 through 2018, though traffic-related deaths decreased.

== Context ==
In 1990 there were 701 traffic fatalities in New York City. In 2013 there were 286 traffic fatalities. 2014 saw the fewest pedestrian fatalities since 1910, with 132 deaths. However, traffic injuries and traffic crashes in New York City under de Blasio's mayoralty have been increasing.

There have been both a greater number of crashes since the program began, according to New York City Police Department data. Collisions on New York City streets increased over 11% between 2014 and 2018. In 2014, there were 205,486 such collisions; that number rose to 228,227 in 2018. There has also been a steadily rising injury toll, according to New York City Police Department data. Between 2014 and 2018, collisions resulting in injuries increased by 18% (from 37,556 in 2014, to 44,508 in 2018).

In 2016, there were 10,775 pedestrian injuries, 148 pedestrian deaths, 4,592 bicyclist injuries, and 18 bicyclist deaths citywide due to motor vehicle drivers. However, in July 2019, de Blasio came under criticism after fifteen cyclists died since the beginning of the year, more than the number of cyclists killed in all of 2018.

== Program ==
=== Implementation ===
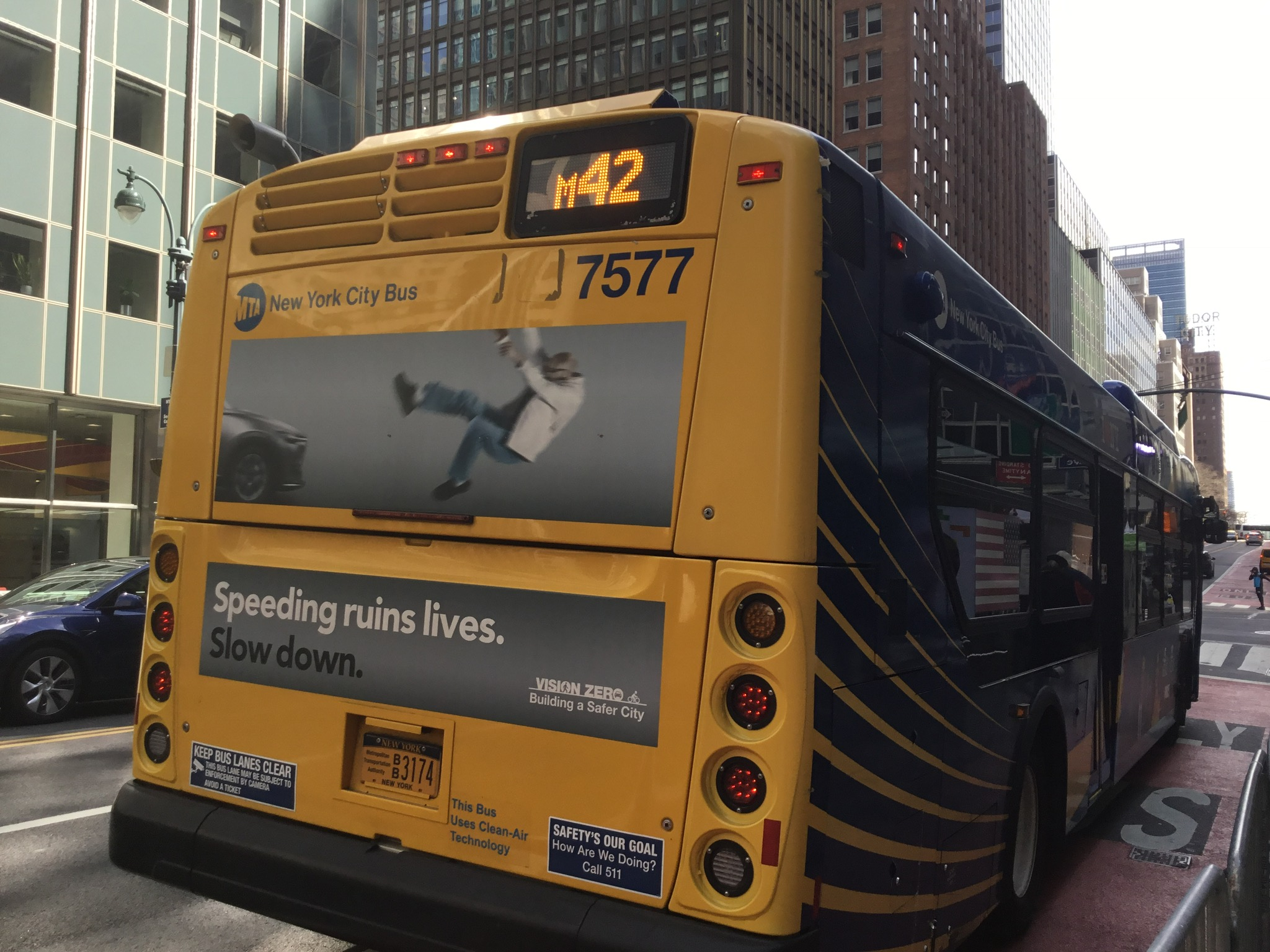
Vision Zero ad campaign on a city bus in 2023

The plan includes criminal charges against traffic violators, speed limit reduction from 30 to 25 miles per hour (48 to 40 km/h), slow zones, increased enforcement, increase use of speed cameras, quicker repairing broken traffic signals, and strict enforcement on taxi drivers. It also includes adding leading pedestrian interval signals, which allow pedestrians to start crossing before parallel vehicular traffic has a green light, to 800 signalized intersections per year. In addition, over 7,500 of the city's 13,000 signalized intersections received pedestrian countdown timers that count down the seconds remaining for pedestrians to cross. New Vision Zero laws made it a crime, punishable by imprisonment, if a driver does not yield to a pedestrian and causes death or injury. Any government official on duty is exempt from this law and is not charged with a crime.

=== Results ===
There was a reduction in traffic fatalities in the year 2014, but the reaction was mixed. Transit union officials say that bus drivers are persecuted through this law, and that they should be treated like government officials and not be charged criminally. Opponents say that bus drivers killed at least 9 of the 132 pedestrians in 2014 and that they should therefore be investigated like anyone else.

Traffic injuries and traffic crashes in New York City under Mayor de Blasio had increased, though deaths have decreased. In 2019 there had been criticism of de Blasio's initiative stemming from an increase in bicyclist fatalities from collisions with motor vehicles to fifteen as of July 2019, as compared to ten in all of 2018. A 2024 study in the American Journal of Public Health found that, as a result of Vision Zero, Medicaid expenses related to traffic injuries in New York City had decreased from $762 million in 2014 to $671 million in 2018.

Evaluations of New York City's Vision Zero policy have generally found positive safety outcomes, particularly for pedestrians. A 2024 study estimated an immediate reduction of about 6% in pedestrian crash incidence following the implementation of corridor upgrades, based on a comparison between upgraded corridors and similar corridors that did not receive upgrades. Long-term analyses of the program in New York City have also identified overall declines in pedestrian and vehicle occupant casualties over nearly a decade of implementation. In addition, studies examining specific policy components have found that reductions in posted speed limits were associated with decreases in traffic injuries, supporting speed management as a key element of Vision Zero.

Total fatalities	Pedestrian fatalities
Source: Year Three Report

== See also ==
- New York City speed camera program
- Transportation safety in the United States
