= Speed limits in Oman =

Oman employs a minimum and maximum speed limits which varies for different types of vehicles and road. The roads are monitored by speed cameras to detect traffic violation such as speeding. Heavy vehicles such as trucks, mini buses and buses are installed with speed limiters to prevent overspeeding.

== Speed limits ==
The speed limit are followed by Kilometres per hour (km/h)

=== Light motor vehicle ===
| Road types | Speed Limit | References |
|---|---|---|
| Freeway | 120 km/h (75 mph) | |
| Rural Roads | 90 km/h (56 mph) | |
| Urban Dual carriageway | 60–80 km/h (37–50 mph) | |
| Urban Single carriageway (Residential areas) | 40 km/h (25 mph) | |
| Parking areas and service road | 25 km/h (16 mph) | |
