= KGYS (urban safety management system) =

Turkish monitoring and imaging system

KGYS, acronym for Kent Güvenlik Yönetim Sistemi" (literally: City Security Management System), is a modular monitoring and imaging system used in urban areas of Turkey for law enforcement to ensure public security, to defend against internal security threats and to perform control tasks more effectively. Significant results are obtained by processing the image and location data in accordance with the legislation, which are supported by results produced by the Turkish Police Information Network (PolNet).

KGYS consists of:

- Command and control center,
- Vehicle tracking system,
- Mobile vehicle inquiry system,
- Police station holding cell improvement and control system,
- Regional imaging system,
- Automatic number plate recognition system,
- Mobile operations management and
- Police computer network.

The 2015-established traffic law enforcement system TEDES, which consists of speed camera, red light camera and automatic number plate recognition device, is an integral part of KGYS.
