= Traffic Electronic Control System (Turkey) =

Turkish vehicle camera and plate recognition system

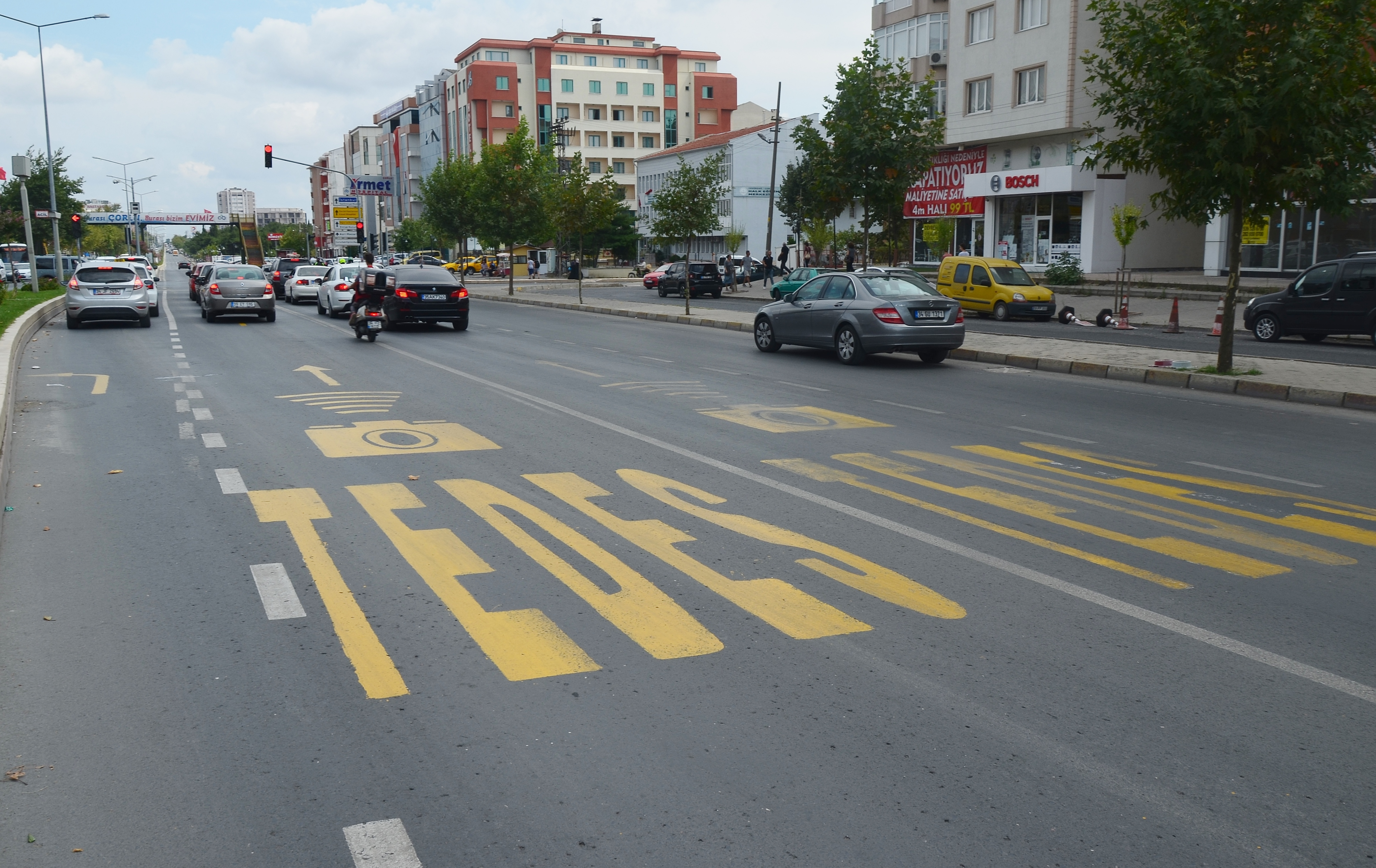
Road markings for TEDES on a street

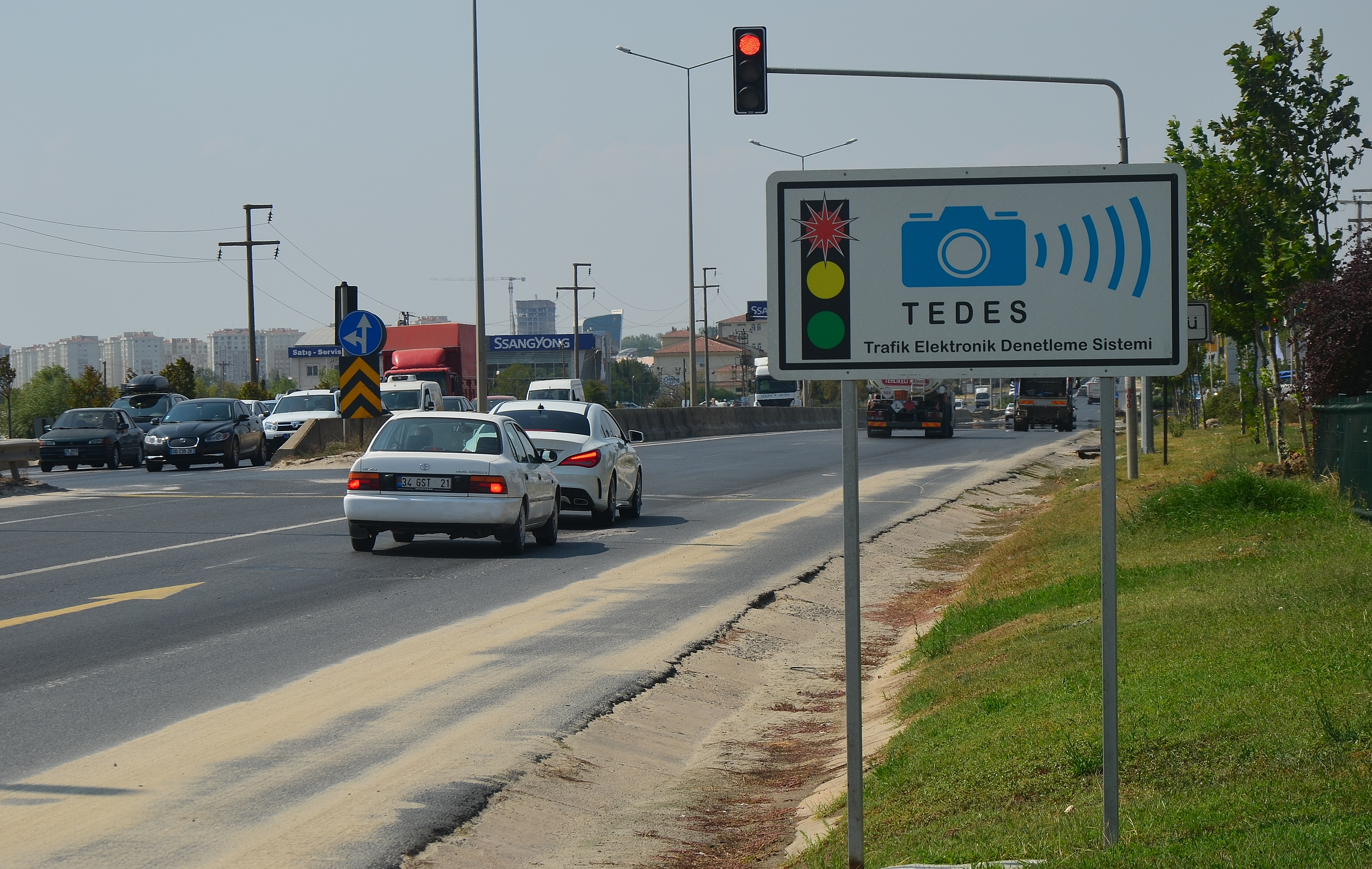
Road sign for TEDES on a highway

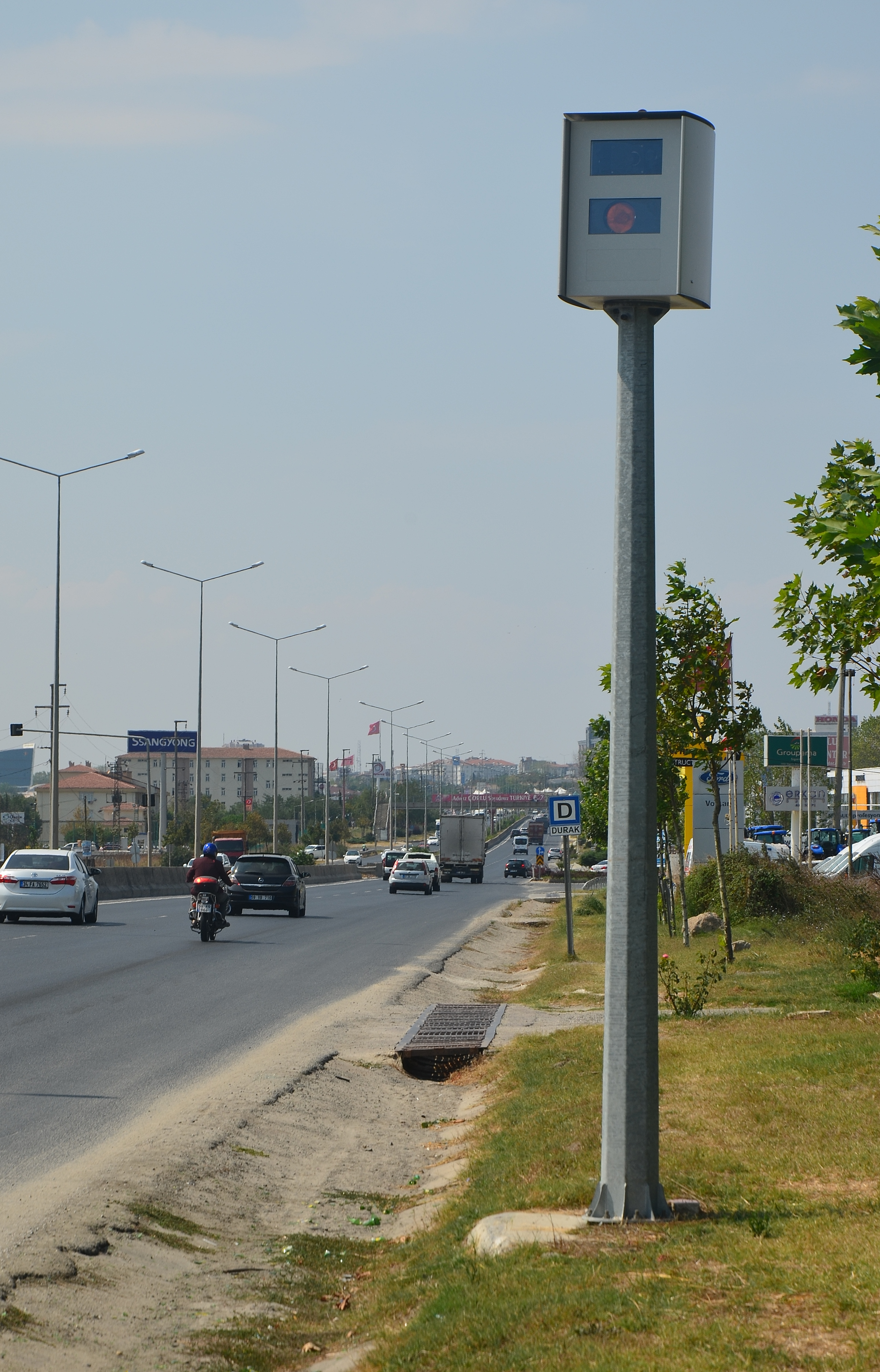
Speed camera of TEDES on a highway

Traffic Electronic Control System, locally known as TEDES, an acronym for "Trafik Elektronik DEnetleme Sistemi", is a monitoring and imaging system for traffic law enforcement used on some streets and highways in Turkey to ensure road safety.

TEDES equipment is an integrated speed camera, red light camera and automatic number plate recognition device. Mounted beside or over a road, it detects violations of traffic regulation such as speeding and red light running. Other capabilities of TEDES are monitoring of driving on emergency stopping lane and parking violations. The system is linked to an automated ticketing service.

== Implementation ==
The legal infrastructure for TEDES was enacted on December 9, 2015, as a supplement to the Highways Traffic Law (Act #2918). For the implementation, municipalities are made responsible. TEDES measures are executed by the Turkish National Police in the name of the Ministry of the Interior and the Ministry of Finance. Municipalities receive 30% of the monthly revenues from the TEDES-related traffic fines for their expenses on installation and maintenance.

TEDES is an integral part of the public area CCTV system (KGYS "Kent Güvenlik Yönetim Sistemi", literally: "City Security Management System") when this is already installed in the related city.

Pilot experiment with TEDES started in Çerkezköy, Tekirdağ Province in November 2013. Other cities in the country implemented the system later with Ordu being the first in November 2015.

== Ticketing ==
The information collected by TEDES is converted to an administrative penalty decision. A traffic ticket constituting a fine assessed against the owner of the vehicle is sent per mail to the owner's address accompanied by an image of the vehicle taken during the violation, which shows the vehicle registration plate. The fine for speeding is categorized in two as exceeding the speed limit between 10% and 30%, and more than 30%. Forced red light violation in order to enable emergency vehicles with right-of-way, such as ambulances, fire engines and police cars, pass through is not charged. According to a court order, traffic law violations of a vehicle assessed by TEDES within five minutes can be charged once only.

Arrival of the ticket per mail can take five to fifteen days. The existence of a ticket can be questioned online at the government's website by giving details of the related traffic registration certificate. The fine can be paid online at the website of the government's revenue administration.

== Controversy ==
The income generated by ticketing the drivers is also shared with the municipalities where the system is commissioned. This incentivises municipalities to install TEDES on the most lucrative parts of the roads to increase the number of traffic violation tickets.

== Road safety ==
It was reported that the number of traffic collisions at the TEDES-monitored intersections and fast lanes in Gaziantep declined by about 40% within two months of the implementation of TEDES in mid-April 2016. The average daily traffic law violation decreased from 3,500 in April 2016, to 1,500 in May and 1,200 in June of the same year. About 70% of the violations were speeding related.

== See also ==
- New York City speed camera program
