= College-preparatory school =

Type of secondary school

A college-preparatory school (often shortened to prep school, preparatory school, college prep school or college prep academy) is a type of secondary school. The term refers to public, private independent or parochial schools primarily designed to prepare students for higher education.

== Japan ==
In Japan, college-prep schools are called Shingakkō (進学校), which means a school used to progress into another school. Prep schools in Japan are usually considered prestigious and are often difficult to get into. However, there are many tiers of prep schools, the entry into which depends on the university that the school leads into.

Japanese prep schools started as chūgakkō (中学校), secondary schools for boys, which were founded after the secondary school law in 1886. Later, kōtō jogakkō (高等女学校), secondary school for girls (1891), and jitsugyō gakkō (実業学校), vocational schools (1924), were included among chūtōgakkō and were legally regarded as schools on the same level as a school for boys. However, graduates from those two types of schools had more requirements for college entrance. In the modern period, many Japanese secondary schools were five-year schools, except for during a short term from 1943 to 1946.

The social status of chūgakkō, or kyūsei chūgakkō (旧制中学校), secondary schools for boys under the old system, did not disappear even after the new system (6-3-3) took effect in 1947. Many shingakukō are six-year schools. Many have their origins in kyūsei chūgakkō and kōtō jogakkō, or ones attached to universities. Japanese pupils who aspire to a prep school education take written examinations in sixth grade in each prep school.

Unlike six-year prep schools, the top municipal senior high school (three-year schools) in each school zone and some high-ranked private senior high schools (ditto) are also regarded as shingakukō (進学校). In the 21st century, some trial cases connecting public junior and senior high schools are seen in each region, too, broadening the education for college entrance. As the Japanese government provides grant-in-aid to private schools, the tuition is 5,000–10,000 US dollars per year, even if it is a private school.

== United States ==
In the United States, there are public, private, and charter college-preparatory schools that can be either parochial or secular. Admission is sometimes based on specific selection criteria, usually academic, but some schools have open enrollment. In 2017, 5.7 million students were enrolled in US private elementary or secondary schools, constituting 10% of total school enrollment. Of those, 1.4 million students were enrolled in a secular (nonsectarian) school.

Public and charter college preparatory schools are typically connected to a local school district and draw from the entire district instead of the closest school zone. Some offer specialized courses or curricula that prepare students for a specific field of study. In contrast, others use the label as a promotional tool without offering programs different from a conventional high school.

Preparatory schools began before the Civil War, when there were no public schools above the grammar school or elementary level anywhere in the US. Their graduates were not ready for college study, so many colleges set up "preparatory academies" to prepare them for college study. The preparatory division could dwarf the college enrollment, as at New York Central College. There were also preparatory schools unaffiliated with colleges, especially for girls, such as the Columbia Female Academy. At the time, men and women did not study together at any level, and there were no women's colleges. Some of the female preparatory schools became women's colleges after the Civil War.

Free high school level education for all became available in the later 19th and early 20th centuries. Since then, the surviving "prep schools" in the US are primarily private, elite institutions that have very selective admission criteria and high tuition fees, catering to students in the 13–18 age range. Prep schools can be day schools, boarding schools, or both, and may be co-educational or single-sex. Day schools are more common than boarding, and, since the 1970s, co-educational schools have been more common than single-sex. Unlike the public schools, which are free, they charge tuition ($10,000 to 40,000+ a year in 2014).

Some prep schools are affiliated with a particular religious denomination. Unlike parochial schools, independent preparatory schools are not governed by a religious organization, and students are usually not required to receive instruction in one particular religion. While independent prep schools in the United States are not subject to government oversight or regulation, many are accredited by one of the six regional accreditation agencies for educational institutions.

== See also ==
- Advanced Placement
- International Baccalaureate
- Gymnasium (school)
