= Mobile speed camera =

A mobile speed camera is speed limit enforcement device used in Australia, France, India, Ireland, Italy, the United Kingdom and other countries to refer to a road vehicle fitted with speed camera equipment which can park at the side of the road, or on overbridges to monitor the speed of passing traffic.

Mobile speed cameras come in many shapes, sizes and colour schemes. Generally there are two types, a vehicle with the camera equipment poking out of the rear (for layby based vans) or out of the sliding side panel (for overbridge based vans) They are not required by law to carry a 'speed camera warning' logo, (although government guidelines state they should) although by the time motorist has seen it, their speed has been recorded anyway. In Italy, mobile speed detection stations must be indicated on the road by appropriate signs.

Introduced over the last year or so are mobile speed traps based on motorbikes to allow speed monitoring in areas where it is impossible to park a vehicle.

The first speed camera device invented in Italy was invented in 1964 by Sodi Scientifica, a family-run company from Florence by Fiorello Sodi.
