= Automatic number-plate recognition in the United Kingdom =

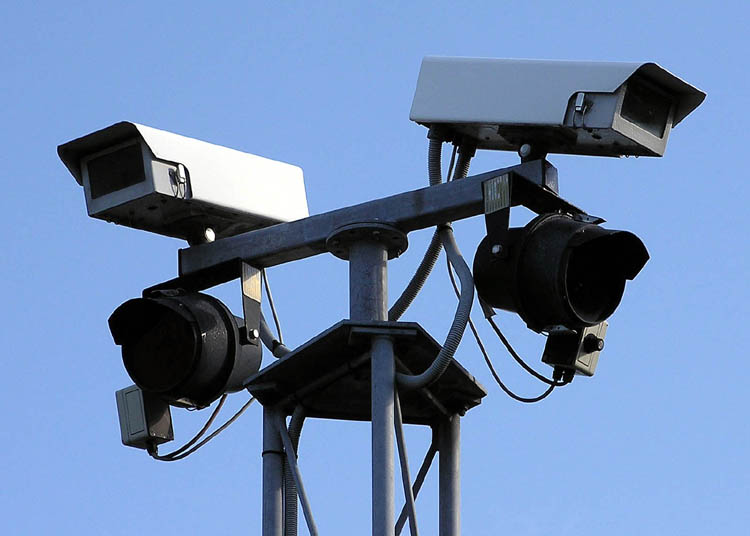
Closed-circuit television cameras such as these can be used to take the images scanned by automatic number plate recognition systems

Automatic number-plate recognition (ANPR) is a technology for automatically reading vehicle number plates.

Vehicle movements on UK roads are recorded by a network of 11,000 cameras that read around 50 million number plates daily. ANPR data is collated from all police forces into a central database and retained for a period of one year, at the National ANPR Data Centre (NADC), which can be accessed, analysed and used as evidence as part of investigations by UK law enforcement agencies.

The Home Office states ANPR is used by law enforcement agencies in the United Kingdom to help detect, deter and disrupt criminality including tackling organised crime groups and terrorists.

The Conservative – Liberal Democrat Coalition government placed ANPR under statutory regulation through the Protection of Freedoms Act 2012. This established a right in law to collect the data, and placed controls on its use, storage and access by third parties.

== The ANPR CCTV network ==
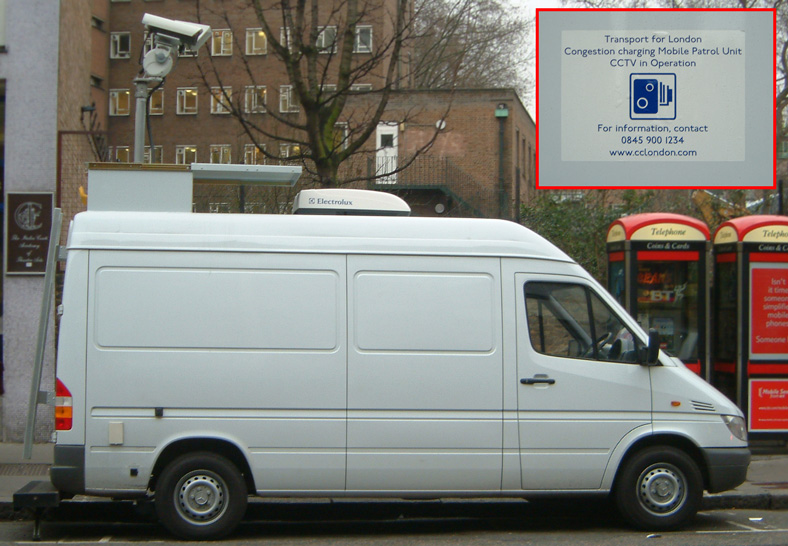
The London congestion charge scheme uses two hundred and thirty cameras and ANPR to help monitor vehicles in the charging zone

In 2005, the Independent reported that by the following year, the majority of roads, urban centres, London's congestion charge zone, ports and petrol station forecourts will have been covered by CCTV camera networks using automatic number plate recognition. Their report said already in use cameras in some areas were being updated to feed data to a new centralised network, as part of a national surveillance strategy.

"What we're trying to do as far as we can is to stitch together the existing camera network rather than install a huge number of new cameras," - Frank Whiteley, ANPR steering committee chairman

Whilst some covert cameras are in use, most are standard CCTV cameras that were modified to be able to identify number plates. All British police forces were to be given dedicated ANPR vehicles, with all the data generated being fed The National ANPR Data Centre.

== National ANPR Data Centre ==
The National ANPR Data Centre stores all ANPR data feed from the various police forces, currently it does not take data from CCTV networks in the UK. It is based at Hendon in north London, on the same site used for the Police National Computer. In March 2006 the National ANPR Data Centre claimed they could store 'reads' of up to 50 million number plates per day, with plans to expand capacity to 100 million reads in subsequent years. Vehicle sighting data is by default stored for two years. At the present 27 million clocks a day, over 18 billion ANPR records would be recorded every year. According to the National Policing Improvement Agency 25,000 hits per day against the ANPR database generate a transaction against the Police National Computer.

=== Crosschecks ===
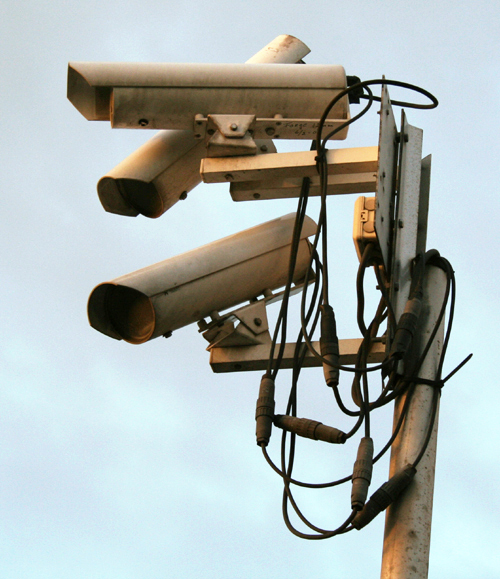
CCTV cameras

The National ANPR Data Centre is connected to the Police National Computer to provide up-to-date lists of vehicles connected by the police to crimes. Other crosschecks will include insurance-industry data to identify uninsured drivers, vehicles without a valid MoT test certificates, vehicles who have failed to pay for valid vehicle excise duty, and/or with vehicles with unlawful number plates.

The National ANPR Data Centre allows analysis across police force boundaries. If a vehicle enters the ANPR network, the police should receive a photograph of the vehicle entering and leaving the zone. As the data generated is stored for two years the police argue criminals could be identified and linked to vehicles.

=== Data mining ===
The National ANPR Data Centre will make it possible for software to data mine previous sightings of license plate to identify patterns in the data. Patterns can be used to build up intelligence of a vehicle's movements on the road network or to find cloned vehicles by searching the database for impossibly quick journeys.

"We can use ANPR on investigations or we can use it looking forward in a proactive, intelligence way. Things like building up the lifestyle of criminals - where they are going to be at certain times. We seek to link the criminal to the vehicle through intelligence. Vehicles moving on the roads are open to police scrutiny at any time. The Road Traffic Act gives us the right to stop vehicles at any time for any purpose" - Frank Whiteley, Chief Constable of Hertfordshire and Chair of the ACPO ANPR Steering Group

=== The database ===
The National ANPR Data Centre uses Java software in conjunction with an Oracle database, using closed-access intranets instead the internet to transmit data. The system will be designed to work with possible future electronic vehicle identification marks on the bodywork of cars.

== Data access ==
=== Police ===
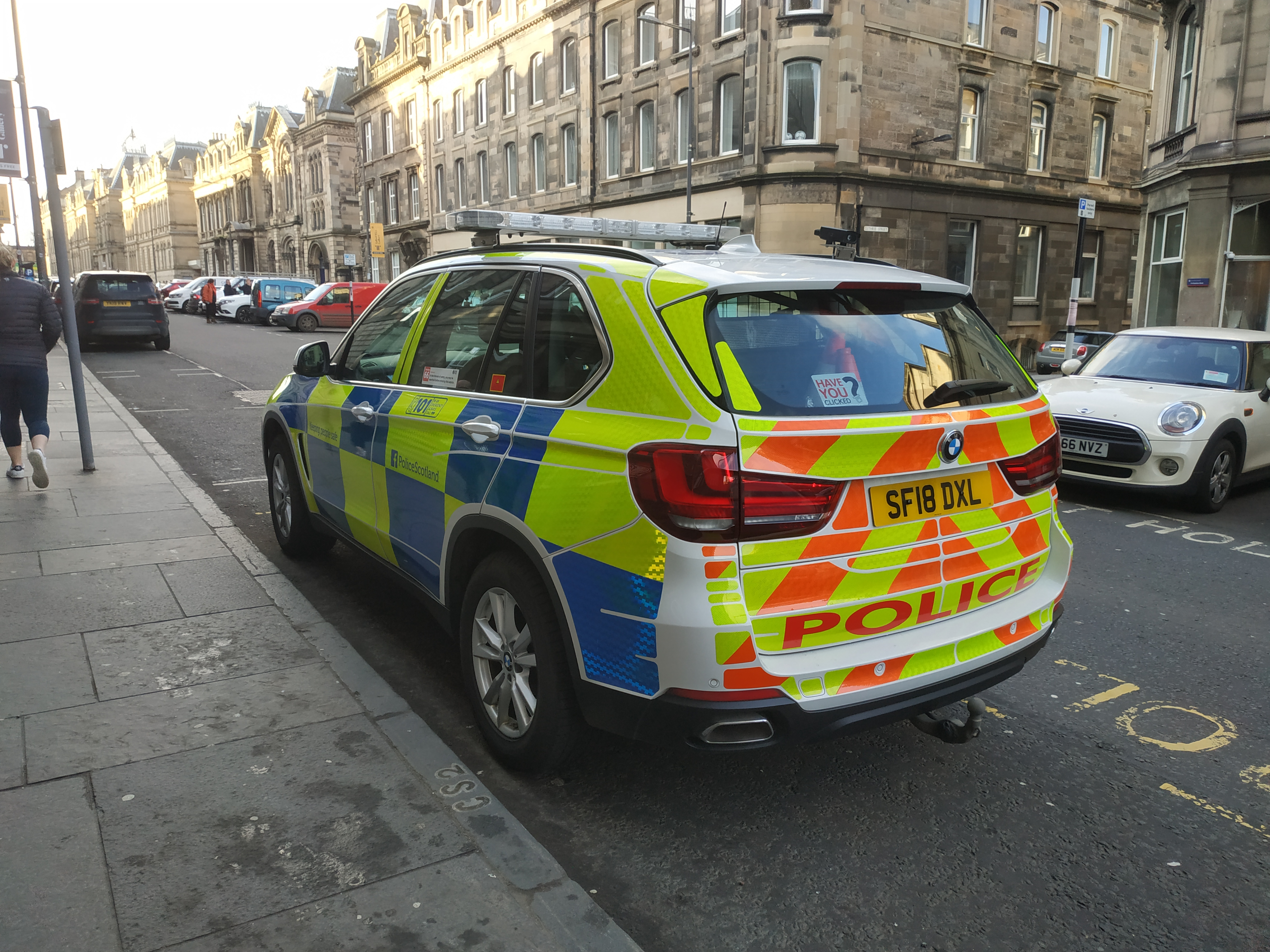
rear-facing ANPR camera on a Scottish police vehicle

All police forces have real-time access to ANPR camera data through direct links to the National ANPR Data Centre. Effectively, the police (and the security services) can track any car (technically any numberplate) around the country in close to real time.

The current restrictions have been a source of contention due to the lack of regulation in access to data, though access is limited due to computing capacity rather than civil liberties. Giving every police officer open access would be taxing on the software, "[making] it unstable, slow it down", according to John Dean, a National ANPR co-ordinator. ANPR records younger than 91 days can only be accessed on the NADC with an Inspector's authority to investigate serious and major crime; enquiries regarding records over 90 days old but less than a year require a Superintendent's authority, and enquiries over a year must relate to Counter Terrorism investigations, and require a Superintendent's authority.

Mobile ANPR systems—such as ProVida ANPR—are becoming more popular as systems in traffic police intercept cars. Their advantage is that officers can get real-time 'hits' from passing vehicles, as they are on patrol.

== Legislation ==
In 2012, the government enacted the Protection of Freedoms Act which includes several provisions related to controlling and restricting the collection, storage, retention, and use of information about individuals. Under this Act, the Home Office published a code of practice in 2013 for the use of surveillance cameras, including ANPR, by government and law enforcement agencies. The aim of the code is to help ensure their use is "characterised as surveillance by consent, and such consent on the part of the community must be informed consent and not assumed by a system operator. Surveillance by consent should be regarded as analogous to policing by consent." In addition, a set a standards were introduced in 2014 for data, infrastructure, and data access and management.

== History ==
In August 2004 a presentation by John Dean, the Association of Chief Police Officers' (ACPO) National ANPR Co-ordinator at IFSEC revealed how ANPR was being used to 'deny criminals the use of the road'.

On 18 November 2005 British police constable Sharon Beshenivsky was shot and killed during a robbery in Bradford. The CCTV network was linked into an ANPR system and was able to identify the getaway car and track its movements, leading to the arrest of six suspects. At its launch in May, Ch Supt Geoff Dodd of West Yorkshire Police, called the ANPR system a "revolutionary tool in detecting crime".

=== Project Laser in the United Kingdom ===
In March 2005, plans were announced to set up a nationwide system of over 2,000 automatic number plate recognition cameras in the United Kingdom.

This followed the successful rollout of Project Spectrum in which all 43 Police Forces in England and Wales were supplied by the Home Office with an ANPR capable mobile unit, and a 'Back Office'. A subsequent series of trials were then commenced in 2002 when the Vehicle and Operator Services Agency (VOSA) was given funding by the Home Office to work with the Police Standards Unit and develop "Project Laser" using the equipment supplied under Project Spectrum. With the aim of running the ANPR system nationwide, it was initially trialled by nine police forces and ran between 30 September 2002 and March 2003. Those police forces covered the areas of Greater Manchester, North Wales, Avon and Somerset, Northampton, London, Kent, West Yorkshire, Staffordshire and West Midlands

The second phase of the project ran between 1 June 2003 and 21 June 2004 and involved 23 police forces in total. The DVLA is also involved with Project Laser, using the system to gather details on unregistered and unlicensed vehicles and those without a valid MOT certificate or insurance cover.

"Eventually the database will link to most CCTV systems in town centres, meaning that all vehicles filmed on one of the many cameras protecting Bedford High Street, for instance, can be checked against the database and the movements of wanted cars traced to help with serious crime investigations."
— Bedfordshire Police

The project was seen as a success despite a Home Office report showing that the Driver and Vehicle Licensing Agency (DVLA) trial had an error rate of up to 40%, with claims that the system was contributing

"…in excess of 100 arrests per officer per year – ten times the national average…"

Further findings went on to show that the error rate dropped to 5% when infrared systems and more regular updates of information were used.

During the second phase of the project around 28 million number plates were spotted in total, with 1.1 million (3.9%) of these matching an entry in one of the databases. 180,543 vehicles were stopped (101,775 directly because of the ANPR system), leading to 13,499 arrests (7.5% of the total) and the issue of 50,910 fines (28.2%). 1,152 stolen vehicles (worth £7.5 million in total), £380,000 worth of drugs and £640,000 worth of stolen goods were also recovered. The primary goal of the second phase was to see how well the costs of the ANPR system could be covered. The final conclusion was that less than 10% of the expenditure incurred was recouped, with the Home Office claiming that the failure of drivers to pay fines contributed to this low figure, and continued to recommend the system be deployed throughout the UK. Report (PDF)

Funding is now in place for the construction of the National ANPR Data Centre capable of holding 50 million ANPR reads per day, destined to form the basis of a vehicle movement database.

There have been stories in the national press suggesting that the use of the network could be extended to catch drivers using mobile phones illegally, and those failing to wear seat belts, although the current system only retains text-strings consisting of number, date, & time.

=== Project Champion ===
Project Champion is a project to install a £3m network of 169 ANPR cameras to monitor vehicles entering and leaving the Sparkbrook and Washwood Heath neighbourhoods of Birmingham, both of which have large Muslim communities. Its implementation was frozen in June 2010 amid allegations that the police deliberately misled councillors about its purpose, after it was revealed that it was being funded as an anti-terrorism initiative, rather than for 'reassurance and crime prevention'.

== Criticism ==
Speaking on 14 September 2008, Simon Davies, the director of Privacy International stated that the database would give police "extraordinary powers of surveillance" and claimed that "this would never be allowed in any other democratic country".

John Catt, 80 whilst driving with his daughter Linda - was stopped on 31 July 2005, despite neither having a criminal record. City of London Police searched their vehicle under section 44 powers of the Terrorism Act 2000 and were threatened with arrest if they refused to answer police questions. After making formal police complaints, it was discovered they were stopped after their vehicle had been picked up by roadside ANPR CCTV cameras, due to their vehicle being marked in the Police National Computer database as a result of them being spotted attending EDO MBM demonstrations in Brighton. Supporters of the Catts highlight the fact that John and Linda Catt had been suspected of no crime, and argue that they were unfairly targeted due to their associations. Police spokesmen described the campaign Catt had been taking part in as a "campaign of illegality designed to pressurise EDO to cease its lawful business" which resulted in convictions for campaigners, and argued that surveillance of Catt was necessary because "his voluntary association at the Smash EDO protests forms part of a far wider picture of information which it is necessary for the police to continue to monitor in order to plan to maintain the peace, minimise the risks of criminal offending and adequately to detect and prosecute offenders". Sussex Police refused to confirm or deny whether a tag exists on their car. As of February 2012 John Catt did not have a criminal record. Catt commented "That our participation in peaceful protest outside an arms factory led to our arbitrary stop-check for terrorist activities many miles away by another force is a very disturbing development of the 'police state'."

The Register has noted that "in theory a system could be organised in such a way that records of law-abiding drivers weren't generated at all, but that hasn't been the way things have panned out."

=== Car cloning ===
The success of ANPR in detecting vehicles of interest to police has led to a new kind of crime, termed car cloning. Criminals target vehicles of the same make and model to copy these number plates so that ANPR systems will record a read on the make and model relating to a fake number plate. Any legal transgressions could then lead to the legitimate owner receiving notification of enforcement action instead of the criminal. There is very little monitoring of number plate manufacture, particularly websites offering "vanity plates" (plates that are supposedly usable only in off-road circumstances, such as car shows) and this gives criminals avenues to attempt to evade detection; ANPR will often show that there are multiple vehicles using the same registration number.

== See also ==
- Civil liberties in the United Kingdom
- Mass surveillance in the United Kingdom
- Privacy
