= New York City speed camera program =

Traffic safety initiative in the largest U.S. city

The New York City speed camera program began in 2014. In 2022, the New York City Department of Transportation (DOT) maintained 2,200 speed cameras in 750 New York City school zones, each camera within a quarter-mile radial distance from a school building. The cameras record vehicles traveling at least 11 miles per hour above the speed limit. The cameras are operational and issue tickets 24 hours a day, seven days a week. In 2020, speed cameras caught drivers speeding 4.4 million times.

== The program ==
In 2022, the New York City Department of Transportation (DOT) maintained 2,200 speed cameras (including about 40 mobile cameras) in 750 New York City school zones (up from 140 in 2019), each camera within a quarter-mile (400 m) radial distance from a school building, on New York City's 6,000 miles of streets. The cameras record vehicles traveling at least 11 miles per hour above the speed limit.

All of the cameras are operational and issuing tickets 24 hours a day, seven days a week. As of September 2022, New York State was one of 18 states that operated speed camera programs, and one of at least 12 states that operated speed cameras in school zones.

== History ==
=== 2014–20 ===
In 2018, New York City shut down its 140 school zone speed cameras, because a 2013 law authorizing their use had expired. In 2019, the New York State Legislature enacted a bill (AB 6449, 2019) to expand the speed camera program and implement cameras around every public elementary, middle, and high school in New York City. The law also allowed cameras to operate between the now expanded time span of 6 a.m. and 10 p.m. each weekday, though not during other hours or on weekends. The authorization to use cameras in 750 school zones made New York City's speed camera program the largest in the U.S.; by June 2020, there was a least one speeding camera in each such zone.

In 2020 Local Law 36 was passed, authorizing the DOT to create a Dangerous Vehicle Abatement Program (DVAP). Under this law, a registered owner of a vehicle that receive 15 or more finally adjudicated speed camera tickets within a 12-month period could be required to take a two-hour safe driving class or else risk having their vehicle seized and impounded. As of November 28, 2022, 1080 notices had been sent to individuals pursuant to the DVAP, 643 individuals had registered for the safe vehicle operation course (of which 630 had completed the course), and 12 vehicles had been seized and impounded by the New York City Sheriff.

From 2014 to 2020, 99.9% of the 7.5 million Notices of Liability for infractions caught by a speeding camera were not contested or were upheld on appeal. One-tenth of 1% of total speed camera violations issued in that timeframe were overturned by an Administrative Law Judge.

DOT data showed that “as of December 2020, speeding at fixed camera locations had dropped, on average, 72%.” Crashes resulting in injuries decreased 8% in school zones with cameras. In 2020, speed cameras caught drivers speeding 4,397,375 times. In 2020 the program collected $187 million in fines. These results did not reflect the later expansion of camera locations and active hours.

=== 2021-present ===
In October 2021, the executive director of Transportation Alternatives said: “Speed cameras save lives.... Speed cameras are also popular — with 78 percent of New York City voters supporting more speed cameras in school zones." In 2021, over half of the vehicles that received one speed camera violation did not receive a second one. That year, there were 266 traffic deaths in New York City.

Before 2022, the DOT's speed cameras operated only from 6 a.m. to 10 p.m. on weekdays.

Then, New York's legislature (SB 5602, 2022) eliminated the restriction for cameras to operate solely between 6 a.m. and 10 p.m. on weekdays as of August 2022. The bill was stripped, however, of provisions that would have taken away vehicle registrations for 90 days if drivers received multiple tickets, instituting an escalating fine schedule for repeat offenders (rather than, as is the case, had each succeeding ticket still be for $50), and resulted in insurance companies being notified about their clients' behavior. On August 1, 2022, the DOT launched 24/7 speed camera operations in its speed cameras, more than doubling hours of operation of the cameras.

In the first four weeks after the speed cameras went 24/7, the speed cameras issued 656,794 violations, representing $32.8 million in total fines. The DOT said that from 2014 to 2020 there had been a 72% drop in speeding at locations with speed cameras.

In 2024, at least 132 vehicles received 100 or more speed camera tickets. Two vehicles received over 500 tickets, and one received 562 tickets; it was ticketed on average once every 16 hours. One car had 19 violations in the year through mid-March, before it ultimately struck and killed an 8-year-old boy in Queens, and the driver was charged with driving at an unsafe speed and criminally negligent homicide.

New York City Councilmember Inna Vernikov voted against expanding the speed camera program. In September 2022, it was reported that Vernikov had been caught on camera for repeatedly and recklessly speeding through school zones. She had received 23 camera-issued tickets since mid-2020.

A 2025 study, using quasi-experimental evidence, found that speed cameras in New York City caused a reduction in collisions by 30% and injuries by 16%.

== Evasion ==
At the same time, drivers were intentionally defacing their license plates to avoid detection by the speed cameras. An increasing number of such drivers bent their license plates, covered them with obscuring plastic or reflective or retractable covers, sprayed chemicals on them, or otherwise marred them to make it impossible for the speed cameras to read the license plates. The Twitter feed PlacardCorruption posts examples of illegal obscured plates. New York State law prohibits placing anything over a vehicle's license plate.

Covered-up plates allowed drivers to evade camera tickets 1.5 million times between March 2020 and January 2022. The problem of evasion worsened, and the percentage of drivers with unreadable plates, because the vehicle did not have a plate or the plate had been covered or defaced, rose from 1% or lower of all the tickets issued from January 2016 until March 2020, to 4.75% after mid-2020. As a result, $75 million in possible fines were never issued.

This in turn led to citizen vigilantes looking for and "fixing" defaced license plates. In September 2022, Manhattan Council member Erik Bottcher drafted a bill to require the DOT to issue monthly reports detailing how many times a city speed or red-light camera was foiled because a driver had defaced or covered their plate.

== See also ==
- Vision Zero (New York City)
