= School zone =

Area around a school where the road speed limit is reduced

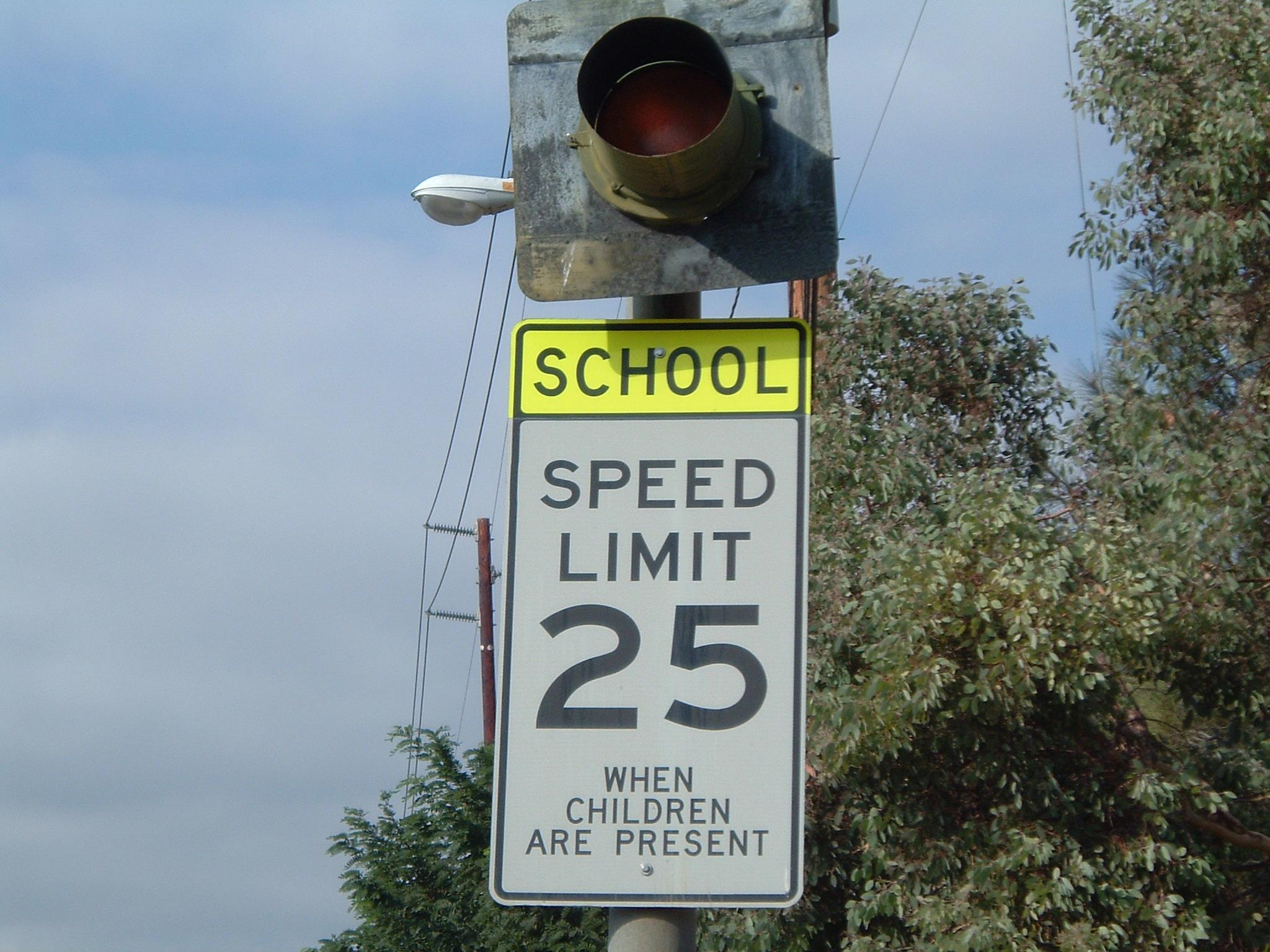
A speed limit sign entering a school zone, along with a warning light above, in Calabasas, California

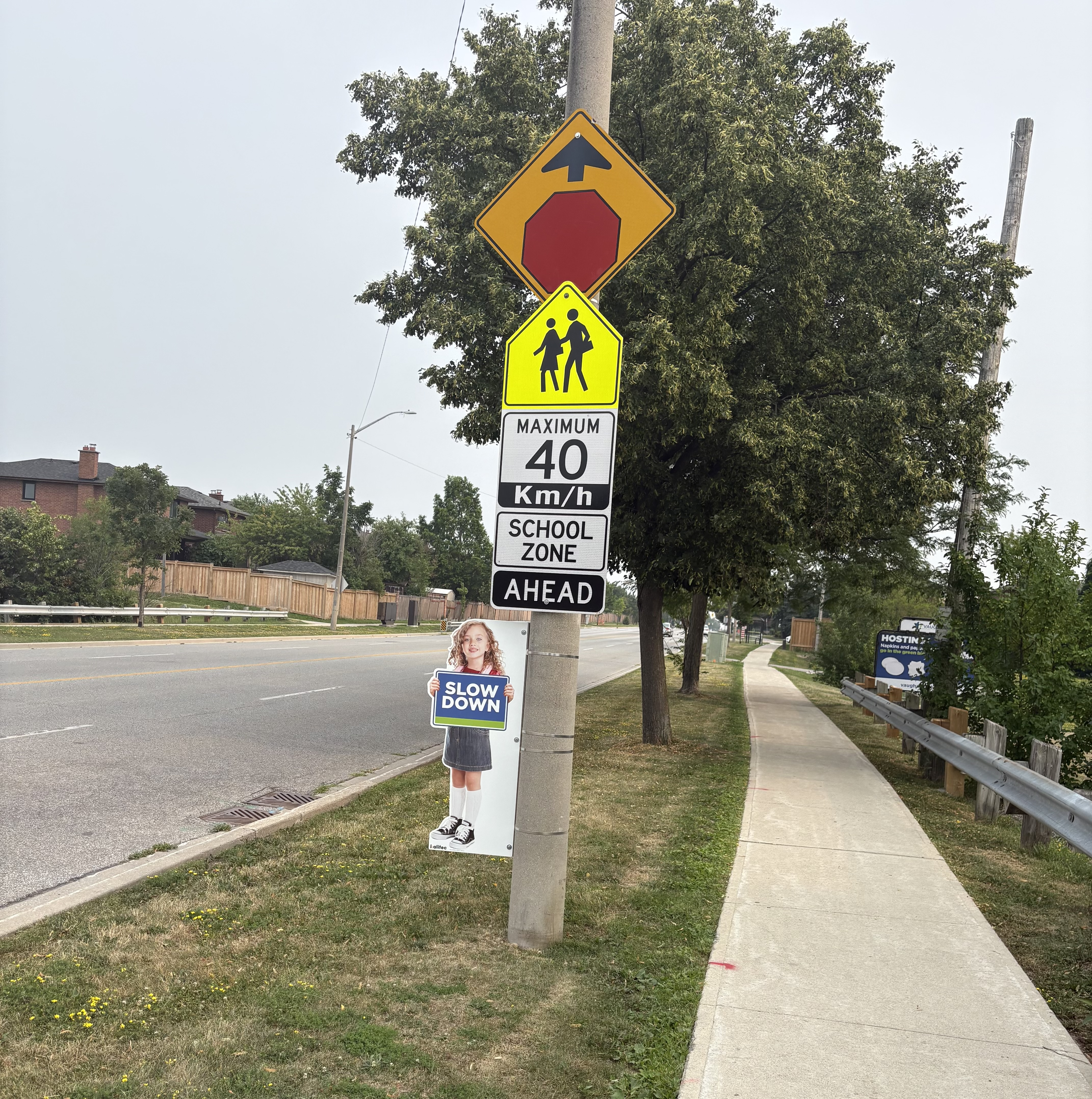
School zone signage in Vaughan, Ontario

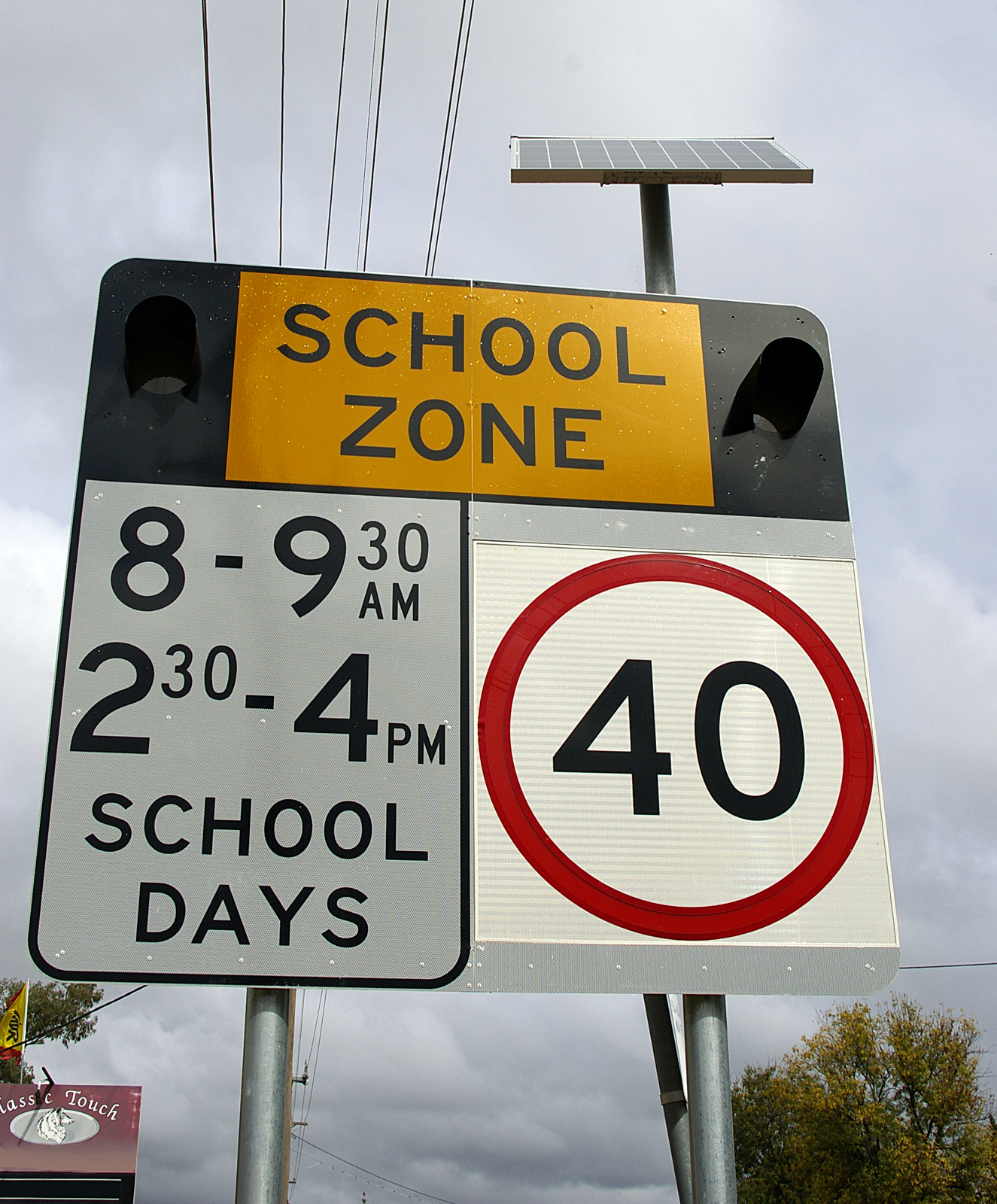
A solar powered school zone sign used in New South Wales, Australia

A school zone refers to an area on a street near a school or near a crosswalk leading to a school that has a likely presence of younger pedestrians. School zones generally have a reduced speed limit during certain hours.

== Fines ==
Fines for speeding may be enhanced in a school zone. For example, many authorities in the United States double speeding fines in school zones. In New South Wales, Australia there are increases in fines that apply in school zones, during school zone times. The most common offences that occur in a school zone also attract demerit points. This includes most parking offences, such as parking on a footpath or nature strip, double parking, disobeying a no stopping or no parking sign and stopping in a bus zone. In the United Kingdom the fine for stopping next to a school is £30.

== When active ==
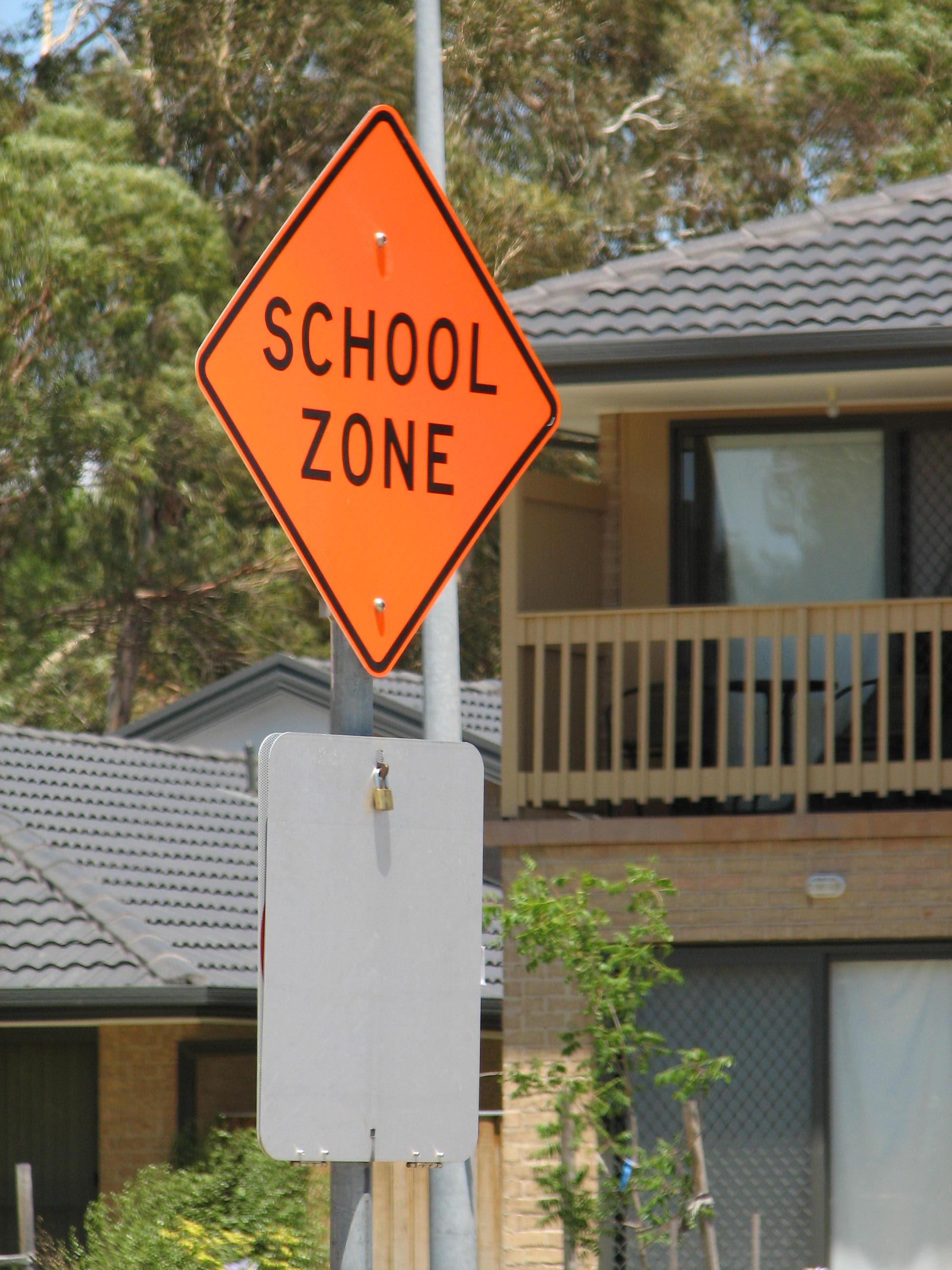
An Australian school zone sign, covered during school holidays, to denote the use of normal speeds

School zone speed limits are often, but not always, only applicable during posted weekday hours near the beginning and end of the school day, when children are likely to cross roads. In some jurisdictions, the school zone speed limit is effective at all times when school is in session, plus additional time before and after the school day. Flashing amber lights often indicate when the school zone is effective. When a school zone also has a large playground facility, it may double as a playground zone and the speed limit could be in effect longer — or even continuous.

In California, school zones are generally in effect only "when children are outside or crossing the street", and usually have a speed limit of 25 mph, or 40 km/h. School zone signs are sometimes amended with the notice "When children are present" (as shown on the photo), which emphasizes its definition in the drivers' handbook.

School zones may also sometimes be in effect during school holidays, due to holiday programs that use school premises. In some locations, however, school zone signs will be locked up during school holidays so that motorists can drive to the normal speed limit.

School zones typically have speed limits between 15 and 25 mph (25 and 40 km/h).

Overtaking moving or stationary vehicles in active school zones is prohibited in some jurisdictions.

== Effectiveness ==
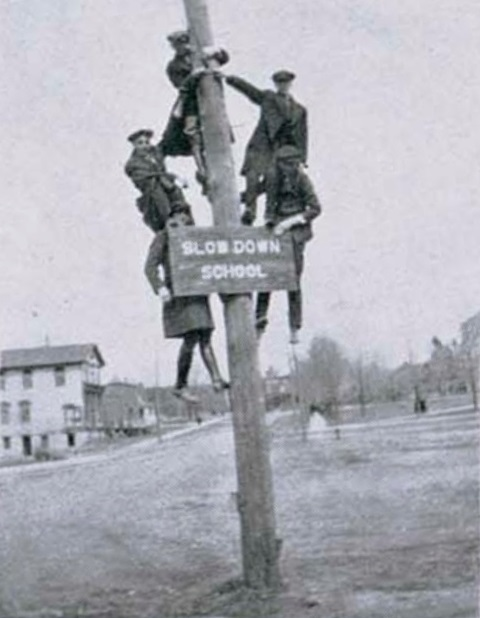
"Slow Down School" sign in Sturgeon Bay, Wisconsin. The safety of school zones depends on the good judgement of motor vehicle operators.

In a review of the available research, the Committee for Guidance on Setting and Enforcing Speed Limits of the Transportation Research Board, part of the United States National Research Council, stated:

Studies of the effectiveness of school zone limits, however, have generally found poor driver compliance, particularly when the limits are set very low, and no relationship between pedestrian crashes and the special limits.

In the Canadian Journal of Civil Engineering it was concluded that "the results of this study provide strong evidence that reducing speed limits to 30 km/h in school zones can bring significant safety benefits by reducing vehicular speeds and fatal and injury crashes."

Despite this there has been no conclusive figures on the effectiveness of school zones.

== See also ==
- New York City speed camera program
