= Redflex Holdings =

Australian traffic technology company

- Industry: Road traffic enforcement products and services
- Founded: January 1997; 29 years ago
- Headquarters: South Melbourne, Victoria, Australia
- Owner: Verra Mobility
- Website: www.redflex.com.au

Redflex Holdings is a traffic technology company that provides vehicle monitoring and enforcement services for government, police, and traffic departments globally. In 2021, Redflex was acquired by the American NASDAQ listed company Verra Mobility and delisted from the ASX

== Redflex operations ==
Redflex operates primarily in Australia and the United States of America, and was listed on the Australian Securities Exchange in January 1997. Redflex Holdings consists of two distinct companies; Redflex Traffic Systems Pty. Ltd., covering Australia and global operations, and Redflex Traffic Systems Inc., covering the US market. The company works with partners in other countries, such as ChinaTel Group in the People's Republic of China. Redflex is based in South Melbourne, where it runs its systems engineering operation as well as its system integration and research and development programs.

In 2011, Redflex was the subject of a failed A$303.5 million hostile takeover bid by the Macquarie Group and Carlyle Group.

Opposition to traffic enforcement cameras owned by Redflex has resulted in their removal in some American cities in Texas and California.

== Bribery investigations ==
In late 2010, Redflex executives were implicated in a bribery investigation in Chicago, Illinois. Following up on a letter from a whistleblower, the Chicago Tribune reported that a Redflex consultant had been making improper payments to a City of Chicago transportation official, John Bills, who was responsible for overseeing the awarding of contracts for the installation and operation of Chicago's widely hated red light camera system. The consultant, Marty O'Malley, who was a long time friend of Bills hired to oversee the Chicago contract, had received US$570,000 in commissions for the contract which had provided approximately US$100 million in revenue for Redflex. A two-year internal investigation conducted by Redflex reported in October 2012 that it had found only one instance of an inappropriate expenditure: a two-star hotel stay at the Days Inn for Bills, paid for by the consultant, who was subsequently sent for anti-bribery training. The Chicago contract is the company's largest in North America; with 384 cameras, it provides 13% of Redflex Holdings' worldwide revenue.

After the Chicago Tribune found additional evidence of improprieties in the relationship between Redflex executives and consultants and Chicago officials, Redflex hired a "former Chicago inspector general, David Hoffman" to lead a new investigation. On 8 February 2013, Redflex received notification from the City of Chicago's Department of Procurement Services that it will "not be considered a responsible vendor for the new RFP for red light cameras that the City intends to issue in the near future." In response, Redflex Holdings chairman of the Australian Board of Directors Max Findlay, board member Ian Davis, and the company's top sales executive all resigned after being blamed for the company's problems in Chicago. Hoffman's report, delivered to the Redflex board in February 2013, found that Redflex had provided Bills with vacations and other gifts paid for by the expense account of Redflex Executive Vice-President Aaron Rosenberg. Hoffman also found that Redflex's president had knowledge of the arrangement and had lied to Chicago's administration about the extent of it. On 20 February, Redflex terminated Rosenberg and filed a lawsuit against him alleging "dishonest and unethical conduct". In a 1 March email addressed to all employees, Redflex Holdings chief executive officer and President Robert DeVincenzi, who took over the company in September 2012, announced the resignations of three top executives in its Phoenix, Arizona headquarters: former President & CEO Karen Finley, Redflex's General Legal Counsel Andrejs Bunkse, and Chief Financial Officer Sean Nolen.

The bribery investigation and ensuing events caused trading in Redflex shares to be halted twice. In 2012, the company reported a net profit of $21.3 million; On 11 February 2013 Redflex announced the figure would be adjusted to US$5.5 million due to legal costs which, after taxes of US$6.2 million are paid, would likely result in the company posting a loss.

In 2015, the Federal Bureau of Investigation and the Internal Revenue Service brought charges of bribery and fraud against former Redflex CEO Karen L. Finley of Cave Creek, Arizona, to which she pleaded guilty to a one-count information charging her with conspiracy to commit federal programs bribery and honest services wire and mail fraud. Finley admitted to a scheme that funnelled campaign contributions to elected officials in Columbus and Cincinnati to either obtain or continue the contracts to supply photo red light enforcement. On 19 October 2016, she was sentenced to fourteen months of confinement for the scheme.
