= Traffic enforcement camera =

Camera for detecting motoring offenses

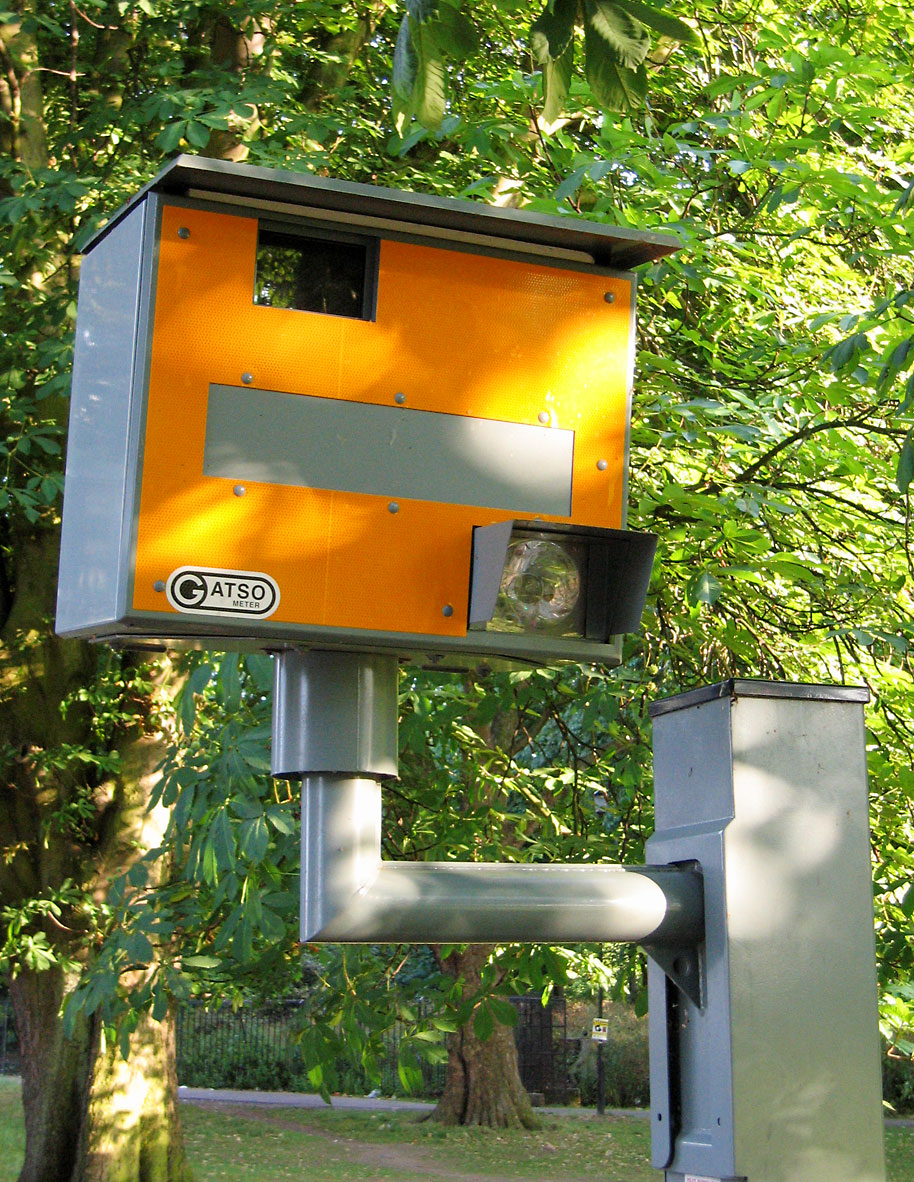
A Gatso speed camera. The camera's lens is visible at top left, while the large flash, used for illuminating number plates and calibration lines on the road when taking photographs, is visible on the bottom right.

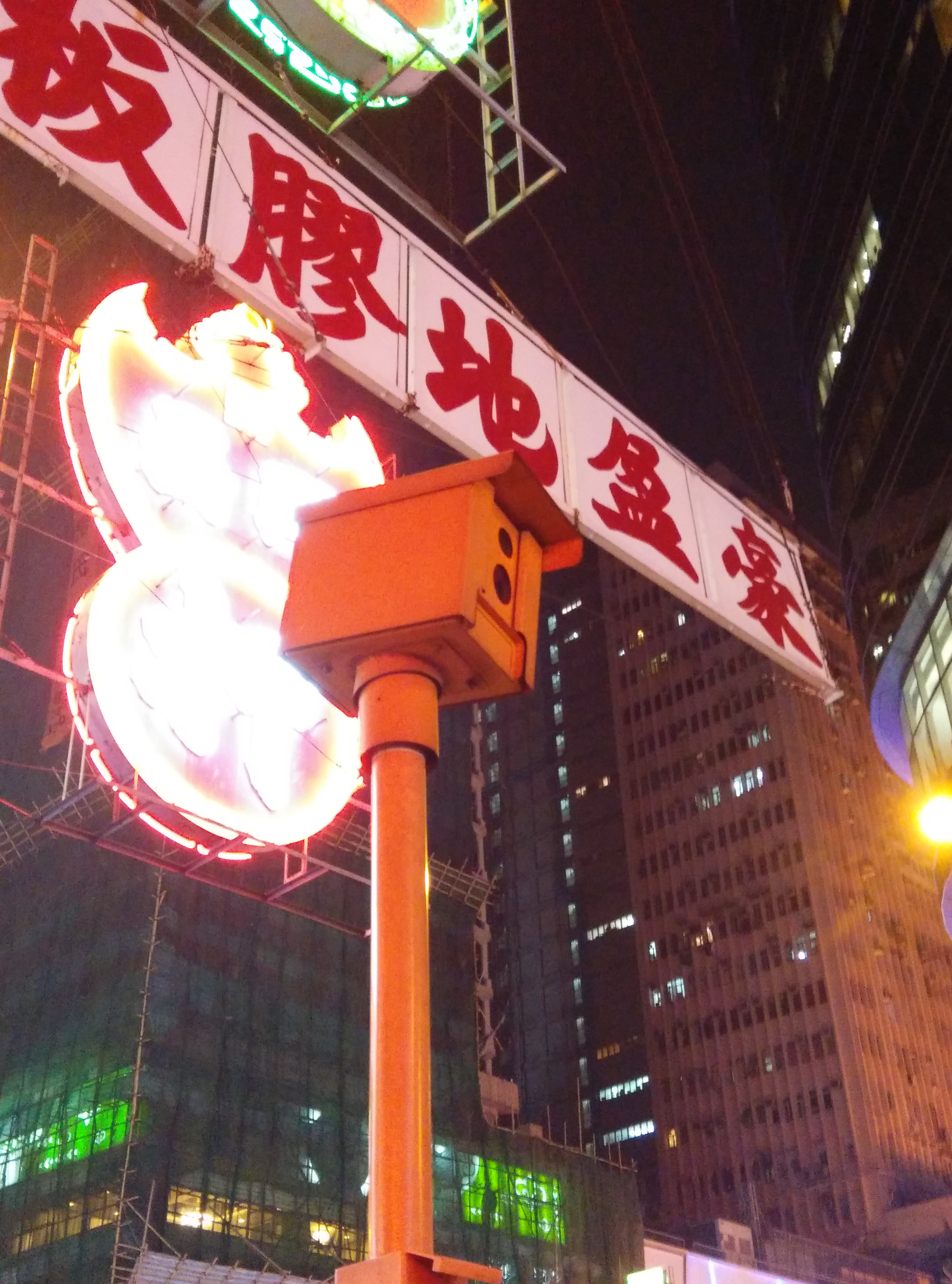
A speed camera in Mong Kok, Hong Kong

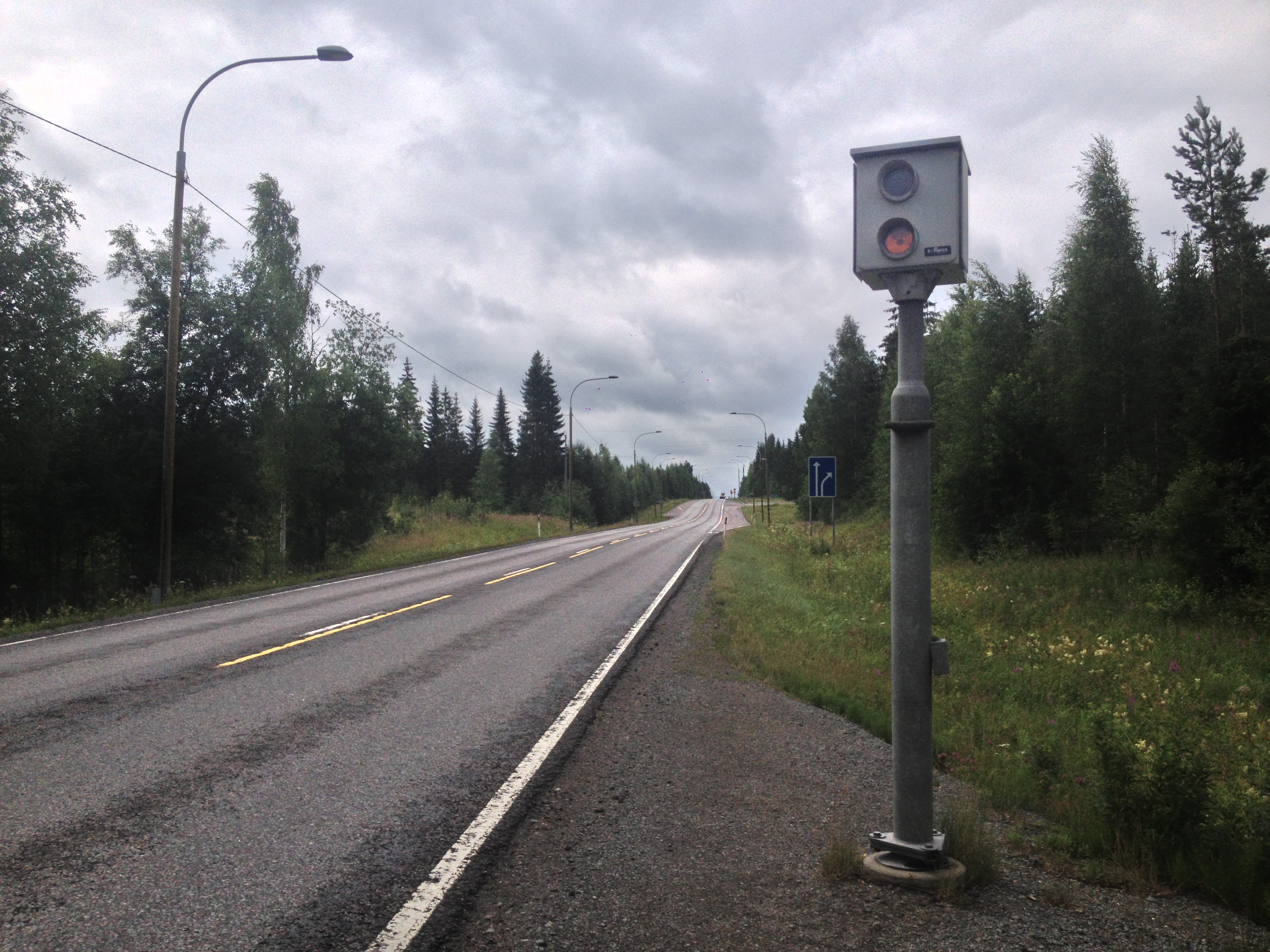
A speed camera on the Highway 5 in Joroinen, South Savo, Finland

A traffic enforcement camera (also a red light camera, speed camera, road safety camera, bus lane camera, depending on use) is a camera which may be mounted beside or over a road or installed in an enforcement vehicle to detect motoring offenses, including speeding, vehicles going through a red traffic light, vehicles going through a toll booth without paying, unauthorized use of a bus lane, or for recording vehicles inside a congestion charge area. It may be linked to an automated ticketing system.

A worldwide review of studies found that speed cameras led to a reduction of "11% to 44% for fatal and serious injury crashes". The UK's Department for Transport estimated that cameras had led to a 22% reduction in personal injury collisions and 42% fewer people being killed or seriously injured at camera sites. The British Medical Journal reported that speed cameras were effective at reducing accidents and injuries in their vicinity and recommended wider deployment. An LSE study in 2017 found that "adding another 1,000 cameras to British roads could save up to 190 lives annually, reduce up to 1,130 collisions and mitigate 330 serious injuries." Research indicates that automated traffic enforcement alleviates biases associated with police stops.

The latest automatic number-plate recognition systems can be used for the detection of average speeds and raise concerns over loss of privacy and the potential for governments to establish mass surveillance of vehicle movements and therefore by association also the movement of the vehicle's owner. Vehicle owners are often required by law to identify the driver of the vehicle and a case was taken to the European Court of Human Rights which found that human rights were not being breached. Some groups, such as the American Civil Liberties Union in the US, claim that "the common use of speed traps as a revenue source also undercuts the legitimacy of safety efforts."

== History ==
Device for speed control in the Hague, newsreel from October 1940

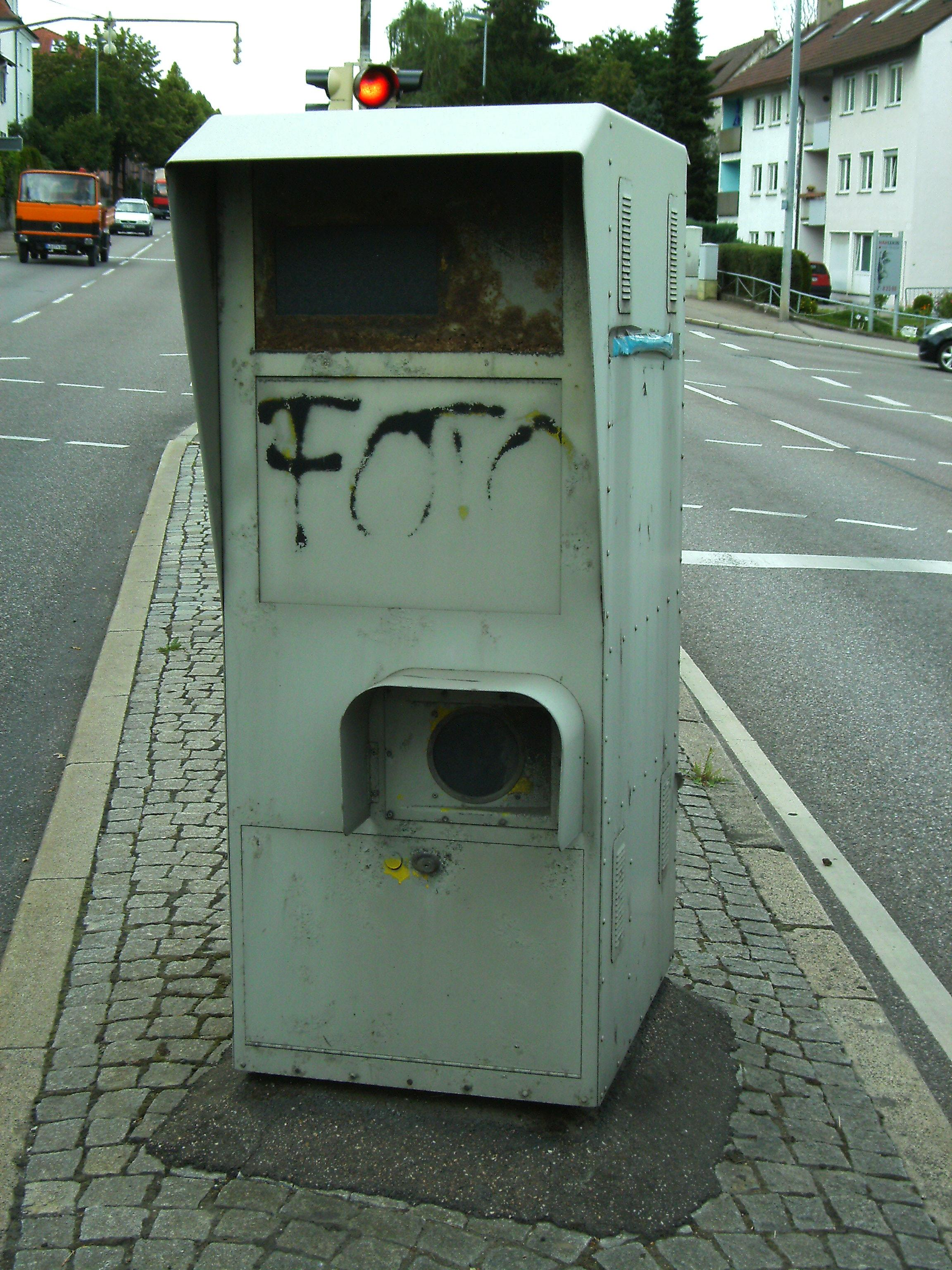
Older traffic enforcement camera in Ludwigsburg, Germany

The idea of the speed cameras dates back to the late 19th century: the 1894 science fiction novel A Journey in Other Worlds, set in the year 2000, includes a description of "instantaneous kodaks" used by police to enforce speed limits. In 1905, Popular Mechanics reported on a patent for a "Time Recording Camera for Trapping Motorists" that enabled the operator to take time-stamped images of a vehicle moving across the start and endpoints of a measured section of road. The timestamps enabled the speed to be calculated, and the photo enabled identification of the driver.

The Dutch company Gatsometer BV, which was founded in 1958 by rally driver Maurice Gatsonides, produced the 'Gatsometer'. Gatsonides wished to better monitor his average speed on a race track and invented the device in order to improve his lap times. The company later started supplying these devices as police speed enforcement tools. The first systems introduced in the late 1960s used film cameras to take their pictures. Gatsometer introduced the first red light camera in 1965, the first radar for use with road traffic in 1971 and the first mobile speed traffic camera in 1982;

From the late 1990s, digital cameras began to be introduced. Digital cameras can be fitted with a network connection to transfer images to a central processing location automatically, so they have advantages over film cameras in speed of issuing fines, maintenance and operational monitoring. However, film-based systems may provide superior image quality in the variety of lighting conditions encountered on roads, and are required by courts in some jurisdictions. New film-based systems are still being sold, but digital pictures are providing greater versatility and lower maintenance and are now more popular with law enforcement agencies.

The first speed camera systems in the US were in Friendswood, Texas, in 1986 and La Marque, Texas, in 1987. Neither program lasted more than a few months before public pressure forced them to be dropped.

== Types ==
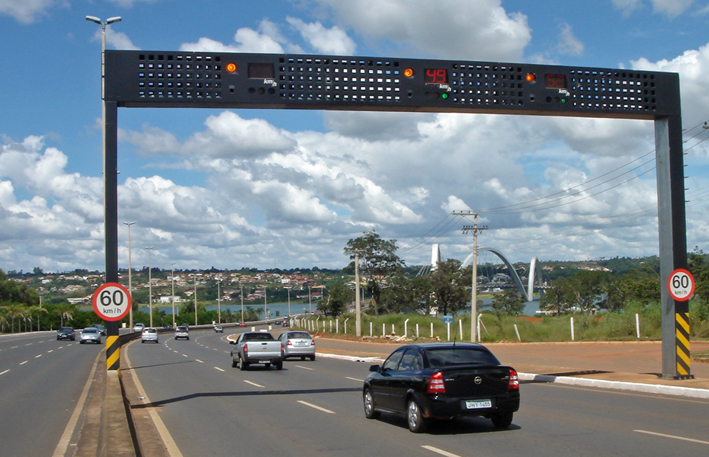
Automatic speed enforcement gantry or "Lombada Eletrônica" with ground sensors in Brasília, D.F

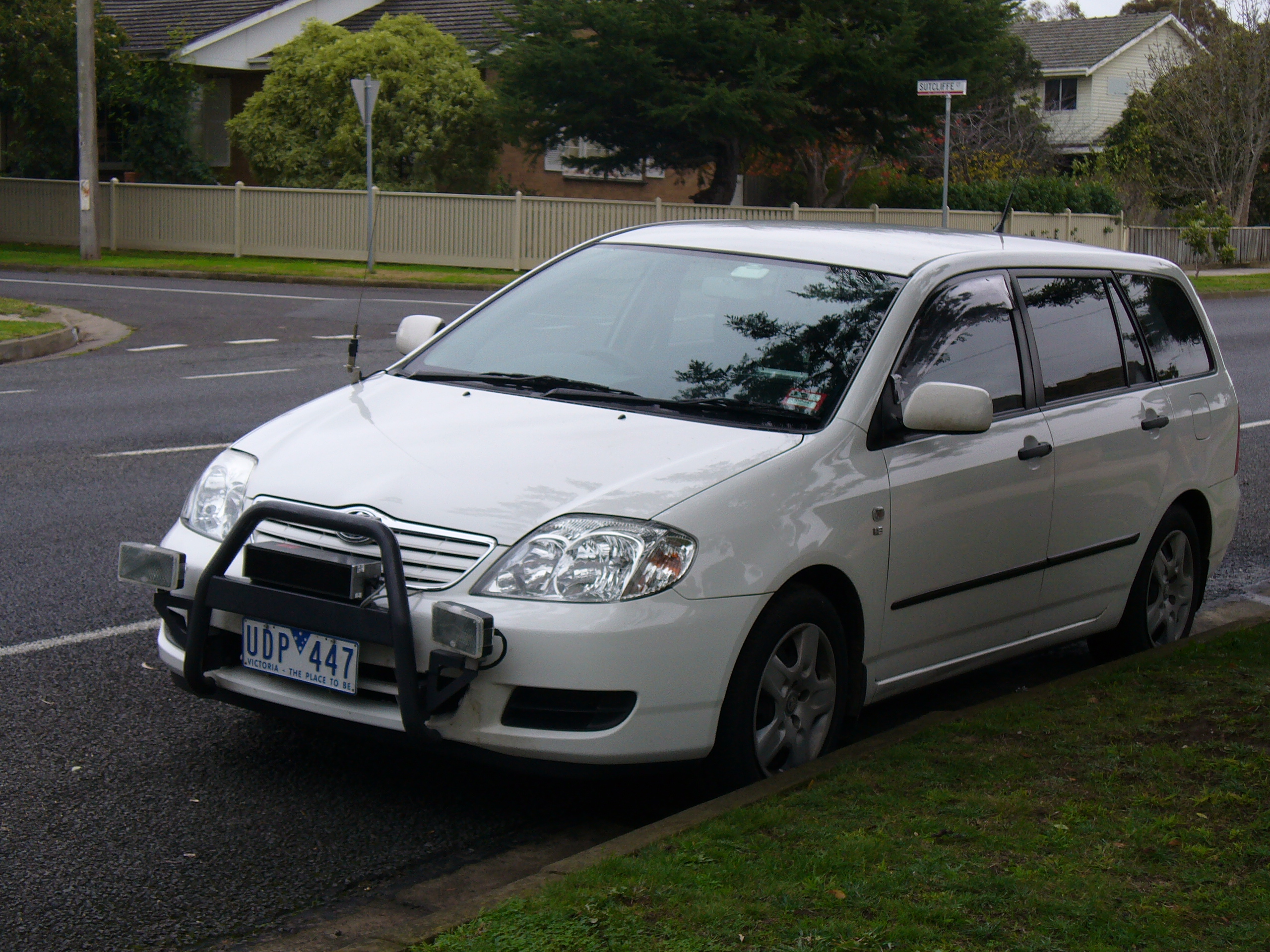
Gatso Mobile Speed Camera, used in Victoria, Australia. The camera is mounted on the passenger side dash, whilst the black box on the front is the radar unit.

=== Bus lane enforcement ===
Some bus lane enforcement cameras use a sensor in the road, which triggers a number-plate recognition camera, which compares the vehicle registration plate with a list of approved vehicles and records images of other vehicles. Other systems use a camera mounted on the bus, for example in London where they monitor Red routes on which stopping is not allowed for any purpose (other than taxis and disabled parking permit holders).

On Monday, February 23, 2009, New York City announced testing camera enforcement of bus lanes on 34th Street in Midtown Manhattan where a New York City taxi illegally using the bus lanes would face a fine of $150 adjudicated by the New York City Taxi and Limousine Commission.

In October 2013, in Melbourne (Australia), Melbourne Airport introduced seven automatic number-plate recognition (ANPR) cameras in their bus forecourt to monitor bus lanes and provide charging points based on vehicle type and the dwell time of each vehicle. Entry and exit cameras determine the length of stay and provide alerts for unregistered or vehicles of concern via onscreen, email, or SMS-based alerts. This system was the first of several Sensor Dynamics based ANPR solutions.

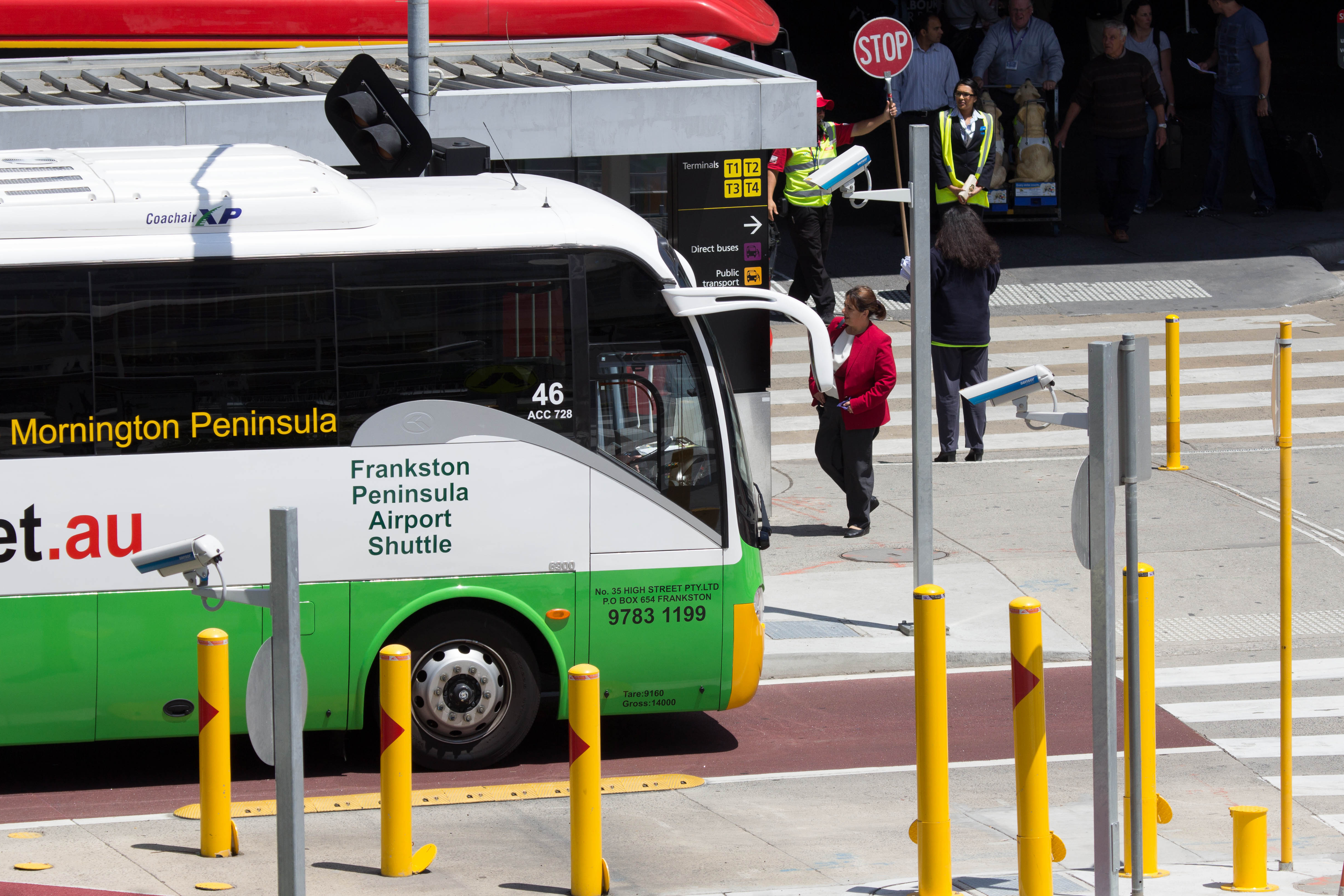
Melbourne Airport was the first Australian Airport to use ANPR technology to charge buses for access to bus pick up lanes.

=== Red light enforcement ===
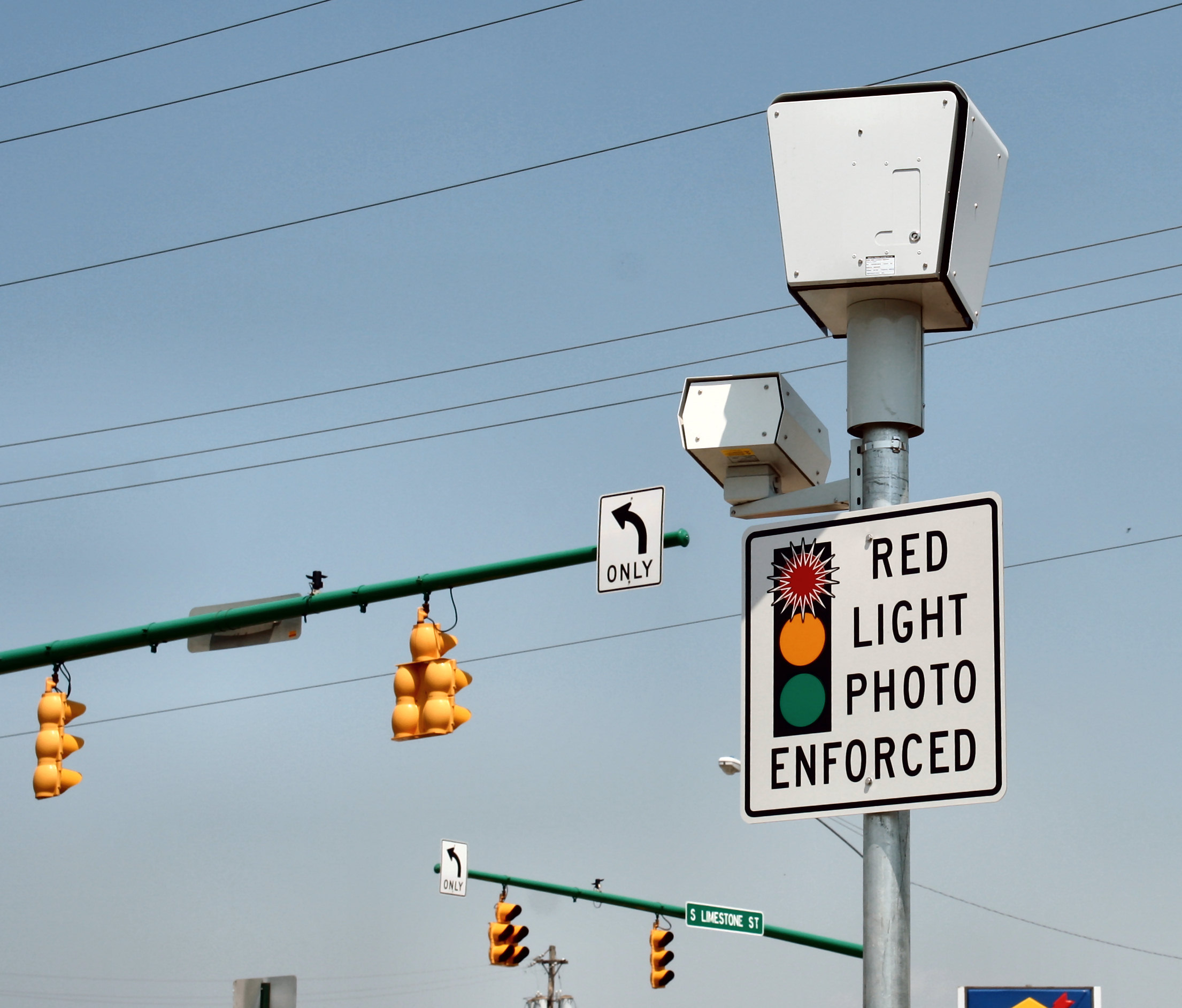
Redflex red light camera in Springfield, Ohio, US

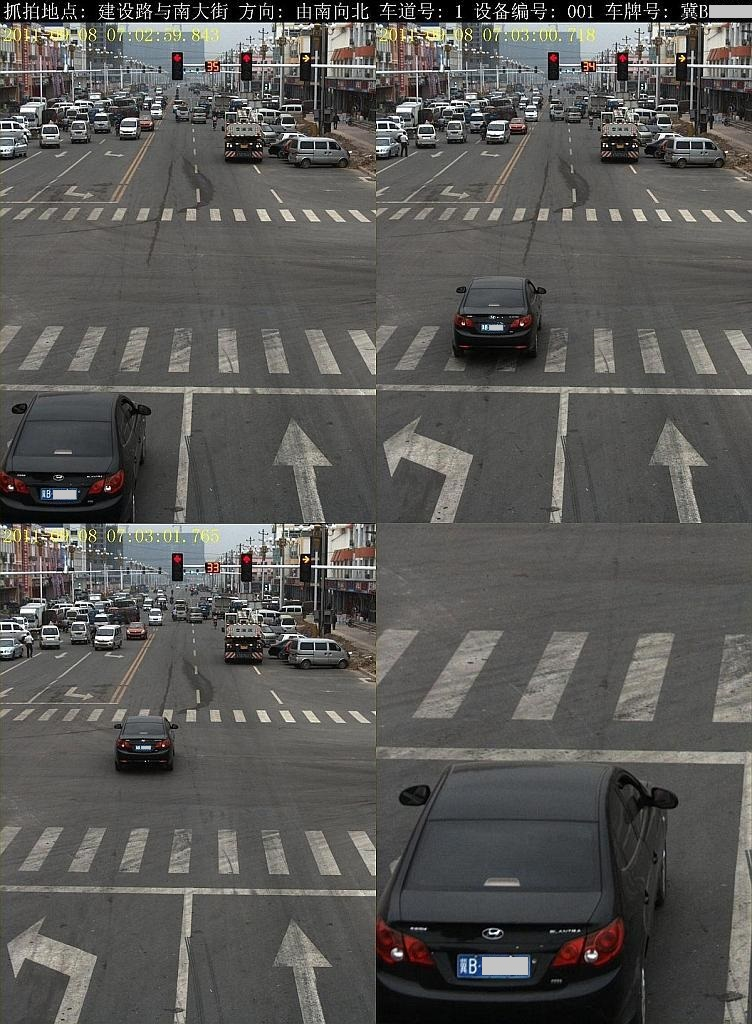
A set of pictures taken by a red light camera in Luannan County, China, the black car in the pictures ran the red light

A red light camera is a traffic camera that takes an image of a vehicle that goes through an intersection where the light is red. The system continuously monitors the traffic signal and the camera is triggered by any vehicle entering the intersection above a preset minimum speed and following a specified time after the signal has turned red.

Red light cameras are also utilized in capturing texting-while-driving violators. In many municipalities, an officer monitors the cameras in a live command center and records all violations, including texting at a red light.

=== Speed limit enforcement ===
Speed enforcement cameras are used to monitor compliance with speed limits, which may use Doppler radar, LIDAR, stereo vision or automatic number-plate recognition. Other speed enforcement systems are also used which are not camera based.

Fixed or mobile speed camera systems that measure the time taken by a vehicle to travel between two or more fairly distant sites (from several hundred meters to several hundred kilometers apart) are called average speed cameras. These cameras time vehicles over a known fixed distance, and then calculate the vehicle's average speed for the journey.

=== Stop sign enforcement ===
In 2007, the Mountains Recreation and Conservation Authority (MRCA), in California, installed the first stop sign cameras in the United States. The five cameras are located in state parks such as Franklin Canyon Park and Temescal Gateway Park. The operator, Redflex Traffic Systems Inc., is paid $20 per ticket. The fine listed on the citation is $100. In 2010, a class action lawsuit was filed against MRCA.

=== Noise pollution camera ("noise radar") ===
Noise enforcement cameras are used to monitor and enforce compliance with local or national vehicle noise limits.

Noise cameras follow the same basic construction: a microphone linked to an ANPR video camera, mounted at a fixed location or on a mobile tripod. The ANPR camera is triggered when the microphone detects a passing vehicle emitting a sound signal above a pre-set decibel limit, capturing the vehicle registration and giving police or local government recourse to warn, fine, or prosecute the registered owner. These cameras have been designed to respond to mass complaints about vehicle noise (in 2020 New York City recorded over 99,000 noise complaints specifically related to vehicles).

Trials of noise cameras have been conducted in cities worldwide. In Taipei, fines range from US$65 to US$130, with additional fines for illegally modified exhausts of up to US$1000. The noise camera scheme won 90% voter approval; the national government then earmarked $4m to build a national network of noise cameras, including mobile cameras.

In 2020 the UK Department for Transport published a feasibility study commissioned from a joint venture between engineering consultancies Atkins and Jacobs. The Atkins/Jacobs noise camera setup was unable to consistently derive sound readings from cars travelling less than ten seconds apart from other vehicles. This camera was a trial unit that has not since been deployed. Similar results were found in a trial in Edmonton, Canada undertaken in 2018. Local government cited technical shortcomings with the trial setup to explain spending $192,000 on noise cameras that recouped $98,000 in fines.

=== Number-plate recognition systems ===
Automatic number-plate recognition can be used for purposes unrelated to enforcement of traffic rules.

The world's first all-weather, 24-hour, automatic number plate recognition system SAFE-T-CAM was developed in Australia for the Roads and Traffic Authority (RTA) by Telstra as the prime contractor and ICONIX and CSIRO as sub-contractors in 1991. In Australia's SAFE-T-CAM system, ANPR technology is used to monitor long-distance truck drivers to detect avoidance of legally prescribed driver rest periods.

The United Kingdom's police ANPR system logs all the vehicles passing particular points in the national road network, allowing authorities to track the movement of vehicles and individuals across the country.

In the UK, 80-year-old pensioner John Catt and his daughter Linda were stopped by City of London Police while driving in London in 2005. They had their vehicle searched under section 44 of the Terrorism Act 2000 and were threatened with arrest if they refused to answer questions. After they complained formally, it was discovered they were stopped when their car was picked up by the roadside ANPR CCTV cameras; it had been flagged in the Police National Computer database when they were seen near EDO MBM demonstrations in Brighton. Critics say that the Catts had been suspected of no crime, however, the police ANPR system led to them being targeted due to their association.

=== Multipurpose camera ===
In 2011, a multipurpose smart enforcement camera was tested in Finland. This camera can check driving speeds, the driver wearing a seatbelt, the distance between cars, insurance, and tax payments.

Other multipurpose cameras can check vehicles passing over the railway crossing.

In 2016, the Metropolitan Manila Development Authority (MMDA) implemented the No Contact Apprehension Policy in apprehending traffic violations such as disregarding traffic control signs and other violations via their closed-circuit television camera or other digital camera and/or other technologies. It was later adapted by other Metro Manila local government units such as Manila, Parañaque, Quezon City, Valenzuela, San Juan, Muntinlupa and Marikina, and also in provinces LGUs like Cauayan in Isabela and the whole province of Bataan.

=== Other ===
- Congestion charge cameras to detect vehicles inside the chargeable area which have not paid the appropriate fee
- High-occupancy vehicle lane cameras to identify vehicles violating occupancy requirements.
- Level crossing cameras to identifying vehicles crossing railways at grade
- Noise pollution cameras that record evidence of heavy vehicles that break noise regulations by using compression release engine brakes
- Parking cameras that issue citations to vehicles that are illegally parked or that were not moved from a street at posted times.
- Toll-booth cameras to identify vehicles proceeding through a toll booth without paying the toll
- Turn cameras at intersections where specific turns are prohibited on red. This type of camera is mostly used in cities or heavily populated areas.
- Automatic number-plate recognition systems can be used for multiple purposes, including identifying untaxed and uninsured vehicles, stolen cars, and potentially mass surveillance of motorists.
- Bus lane cameras that detect vehicles that should not be in the bus lane. These may be mounted on buses themselves as well as by the roadside.

Fixed camera systems can be housed in boxes, mounted on poles beside the road, or attached to gantries over the road, or to overpasses or bridges. Cameras can be concealed, for example in garbage bins.

Mobile speed cameras may be hand-held, tripod-mounted, or vehicle-mounted. In vehicle-mounted systems, detection equipment and cameras can be mounted to the vehicle itself, or simply tripod-mounted inside the vehicle and deployed out a window or door. If the camera is fixed to the vehicle, the enforcement vehicle does not necessarily have to be stationary and can be moved either with or against the flow of traffic. In the latter case, depending on the direction of travel, the target vehicle's relative speed is either added or subtracted from the enforcement vehicle's own speed to obtain its actual speed. The speedometer of the camera vehicle needs to be accurately calibrated.

== Effectiveness ==
Aside from the issues of legality in some countries and states and sometimes opposition the effectiveness of speed cameras is very well documented. Professor Stephen Glaister notes, "What [studies have done] is to show that at camera sites, speeds have been reduced, and that as a result, collisions resulting in injuries have fallen. The government has said that a decision on whether speed cameras should be funded must be taken at a local level. With the current pressure on public funds, there will be – indeed there already are – those who say that what little money there is can be better spent. [However, the] devices are already there; they demonstrate value for money, yet are not significant revenue raisers for the Treasury; they are shown to save lives; and despite the headlines, most people accept the need for them. Speed cameras should never be the only weapon in the road safety armoury, but neither should they be absent from the battle."

The 2010 Cochrane Review of speed cameras for the prevention of road traffic injuries and deaths reported that all 28 studies accepted by the authors found the effect of speed cameras to be a reduction in all crashes, injury crashes, and death or severe injury crashes. "Twenty eight studies measured the effect on crashes. All 28 studies found a lower number of crashes in the speed camera areas after implementation of the program. In the vicinity of camera sites, the reductions ranged from 8% to 49% for all crashes, with reductions for most studies in the 14% to 25% range. For injury crashes the decrease ranged between 8% and 50% and for crashes resulting in fatalities or serious injuries the reductions were in the range of 11% to 44%. Effects over wider areas showed reductions for all crashes ranging from 9% to 35%, with most studies reporting reductions in the 11% to 27% range. For crashes resulting in death or serious injury reductions ranged from 17% to 58%, with most studies reporting this result in the 30% to 40% reduction range. The studies of longer duration showed that these positive trends were either maintained or improved with time. Nevertheless, the authors conceded that the magnitude of the benefit from speed cameras "is currently not deducible" due to limitations in the methodological rigor of many of the 28 studies cited, and recommended that "more studies of a scientifically rigorous and homogenous nature are necessary, to provide the answer to the magnitude of effect."

The 2010 report, "The Effectiveness of Speed Cameras A review of evidence", by Richard Allsop concludes "The findings of this review for the RAC Foundation, though reached independently, are essentially consistent with the Cochrane Review conclusions. They are also broadly consistent with the findings of a meta-analysis reported in the respected Handbook of Road Safety Measures, of 16 studies, not including the four-year evaluation report, of the effects of fixed cameras on numbers of collisions and casualties."

A 2019 meta-analysis found red light cameras reduced total crashes by 12% and generally reduced right-angle crashes but increased rear-end crashes. Their safety impacts also increased over time, and the cameras sometimes had a spillover effect where similar driver behaviours took place at nearby intersections.

=== Canada ===
A study published in the journal Injury Prevention led by The Hospital for Sick Children in Toronto analyzed 50 automated speed cameras in school zones across the city in 2020 and found that number of speeding vehicles decreased by 45 percent; although the study did not directly measure injury outcomes.

=== United Kingdom ===
In 2001 the Nottingham Safety Camera Pilot achieved "virtually complete compliance" on the major ring road into the city using average speed cameras, across all Nottinghamshire SPECS installations, KSI (Killed / Seriously Injured) figures have fallen by an average of 65%.

In 2003 the British Medical Journal reported that speed cameras were effective at reducing accidents and injuries and recommended wider deployment. In February 2005 the British Medical Journal again reported that speed cameras were an effective intervention in reducing road traffic collisions and related casualties, noting however that most studies to date did not have satisfactory control groups. In 2003 Northumbria Police's Acting Chief Inspector of motor patrols suggested that cameras did not reduce casualties but did raise revenue – an official statement from the police force later re-iterated that speed cameras do reduce casualties.

In December 2005 the Department for Transport published a four-year report into Safety Camera Partnerships which concluded that there was a 22% reduction in personal injury collisions and 42% fewer people being killed or seriously injured following the installation of cameras. The Times reported that this research showed that the department had been previous exaggerating the safety benefits of speed cameras but that the results were still 'impressive'.

A report published by the RAC Foundation in 2010 estimated that an additional 800 more people a year could be killed or seriously injured on the UK's roads if all speed cameras were scrapped. A survey conducted by The Automobile Association in May 2010 indicated that speed cameras were supported by 75% of their members.

The town of Swindon abandoned the use of fixed cameras in 2009, questioning their cost effectiveness with the cameras being replaced by vehicle activated warning signs and enforcement by police using mobile speed cameras: in the nine months following the switch-off there was a small reduction in accident rates which had changed slightly in similar periods before and after the switch off (Before: 1 fatal, 1 serious and 13 slight accidents. Afterwards: no fatalities, 2 serious and 12 slight accidents). The journalist George Monbiot said that the results were not statistically significant highlighting earlier findings across the whole of Wiltshire that there had been a 33% reduction in the number of people killed and seriously injured generally and a 68% reduction at camera sites during the previous 3 years. In 2012, the town had the fewest accident rates per 1,000 registered vehicles: a result linked by the Local Authority Member for Council Transformation, Transport and Strategic Planning to the removal of speed cameras and resultant additional funding for road safety, alongside close working with the police.

In Scotland, the introduction of average speed cameras significantly reduced speeding on the A9 and A96.

==== Home Office Type Approval ====
HOTA is an acronym for Home Office Type Approval, a testing and certification process by the Home Office in the United Kingdom that speed cameras must pass before evidence from them can be admissible in UK courts by way of certification in accordance with Section 20 of the Road Traffic Offenders Act 1988 (RTOA) (Amended by the Road Traffic Act 1991). It is a misconception that speed enforcement devices must be Home Office Type Approved before they may be deployed on public roads to gather evidence of speeding offences however if the device does not have UK Type Approval then the evidence from the device is not able to be certified but must be adduced by a witness and perhaps an expert witness who is able to adduce evidence of its accuracy. The Road Traffic Offenders Act route via Section 20 certification is a clear advantage over the unapproved equipment route to court.

The Type Approval of devices that meet the definitions or more accurately "prescriptions" of types of devices in Statutory Instruments (forms of secondary legislation) is administered by the Home Office Road Crimes Section with the scientific scrutiny now performed by The Defence Science and Technology Laboratory (DSTL) in conjunction with accredited technical laboratories. The National Police Chiefs Council (NPCC) oversee a secretariat who coordinate police and laboratory testing of equipment in the process.

Only when DSTL scrutiny, laboratory testing and road testing is completed, and the equipment fully meets the specifications in the relevant Home Office Speedmeter Handbook will the equipment be recommended to the Secretary of State to be awarded UK Type Approval. Once recommended an administrative process takes place between the Home Office and the UK manufacturer or distributing agent in which a contract (Type Approval Agreement) is exchanged and agreed between both parties. When that contract is signed then a Type Approval Certificate is signed by a minister at the Home Office; the equipment can then be used to produce certifiable evidence, evidence of speeding that is admissible in UK courts without the support of a witness. There is no requirement to place the Type Approval Agreement or Certificate of Type Approval before Parliament because the Statutory Instrument defining the "type" of equipment has already been fully ratified by both Houses of Parliament.

The accuracies required to meet HOTA, as laid out in the Speedmeter Handbooks, are agreed internationally. They are not particularly challenging to meet for modern digital equipment however, HOTA requirements extend beyond accuracies; it is often the requirement that an instrument must not cause a violation record to be made when no violation exists that is the most difficult to meet. The Speedmeter Handbooks are freely and openly available to view, they provide guidance to manufacturers and the accredited test laboratories in the general requirements. DSTL and the Home Office may vary the requirements at any time and may adapt them depending upon the equipment that is to be assessed, the Handbooks being "guidance".

Unlike approval systems in most countries, no equipment is approved without a police input into the testing. Rather than simply testing speed accuracy, the systems are all tested in real traffic situations some of which are created specifically to test a perceived weakness in the systems. Track and real road testing is always conducted so that all kinds of vehicles and traffic situations are used to stimulate the systems. Roadside equipment such as fixed cameras must pass environmental testing before deployment in road testing. The period used for road testing ensures that the systems are tested in all weather.

If one detection is made that is outside of the accuracy parameters or if one violation record is produced when no violation existed during any test, then the device will fail its approval until that error is rectified to the satisfaction of the Home Office and DSTL. When rectification is demonstrated testing may recommence.

=== United States ===
According to the 2003 NCHRP study on Red Light Running (RLR), "RLR automated enforcement can be an effective safety countermeasure....[I]t appears from the findings of several studies that, in general, RLR cameras can bring about a reduction in the more severe angle crashes with, at worst, a slight increase in less severe rear-end crashes. However it noted that "there is not enough empirical evidence based on proper experimental design procedures to state this conclusively."

A study conducted in Alabama and published in 2016 reveals that Red Light Cameras (RLCs) seem to have a slight impact on the clearance lost time; the intersections equipped with RLCs are half a second less in use compared with those without cameras; and highway capacity manual estimates a shorter lost time and thus may overestimate the intersection's capacity.

A 2024 study found that automated traffic enforcement through speed cameras led to more equitable enforcement of speeding rules than police stops. Police stops were substantially more likely to target black drivers than automated traffic cameras were.

A 2025 study, using quasi-experimental evidence, found that speed cameras in New York City caused a reduction in collisions by 30% and injuries by 16%.

Six months after activating its Speed Safety Camera Program in 2025, the San Francisco Municipal Transportation Agency reported a 72% reduction in speeding at 15 camera-equipped locations. This has resulted in approximately 20,000 fewer vehicles speeding daily at these sites and a 4 MPH drop in average speeds. It is the first city in California to implement a speed camera pilot under Assembly Bill 645.

== Controversy ==
=== Legal issues ===
Various legal issues arise from such cameras and the laws involved in how cameras can be placed and what evidence is necessary to prosecute a driver varies considerably in different legal systems.

One issue is the potential conflict of interest when private contractors are paid a commission based on the number of tickets they are able to issue. Pictures from the San Diego red light camera systems were ruled inadmissible as court evidence in September 2001. The judge said that the "total lack of oversight" and "method of compensation" made evidence from the cameras "so untrustworthy and unreliable that it should not be admitted".

Some US states and provinces of Canada, such as British Columbia, the registered owner of the vehicle who is legally responsible for paying all such fines, regardless who was driving the vehicle at the time of the offense, although the owner is released from liability by identifying the actual driver and that person pays the fine, and in most such jurisdictions, convictions for such traffic offenses do not result in additional consequences for either drivers or owners (such as demerit points) besides the immediate financial consideration of the fine. In such jurisdictions, corporations that own vehicles (such as rental car companies) almost invariably require authorized drivers to agree in writing to assume financial responsibly for all such tickets.

In a few US states (including California), the cameras are set up to get a "face photo" of the driver. This has been done because in those states red light camera tickets are criminal violations, and criminal charges must always name the actual violator. In California, that need to identify the actual violator has led to the creation of a unique investigatory tool, the fake "ticket". Many states have outlawed the use of traffic enforcement cameras.

In April 2000, two motorists who were caught speeding in the United Kingdom challenged the Road Traffic Act 1988, which required the keeper of a car to identify the driver at a particular time as being in contradiction to the Human Rights Act 1998 on the grounds that it amounted to a 'compulsory confession', also that since the camera partnerships included the police, local authorities, Magistrates Courts Service (MCS) and Crown Prosecution Service (CPS) which had a financial interest in the fine revenue that they would not get a fair trial. Their plea was initially granted by a judge then overturned but was then heard by the European Court of Human Rights (ECtHR), and the European Court of Justice (ECJ). In 2007 the European Court of Human Rights found there was no breach of article 6 in requiring the keepers of cars caught speeding on camera to provide the name of the driver.

=== Accuracy ===
In December 2012, Speed Camera Contractor Xerox Corporation's cameras deployed in Baltimore were producing erroneous speed readings at a rate 5% in some locations. The erroneous citations included at least one issued to a completely stationary car.

Where verification photos are recorded on a time sequence, allowing the calculation of actual speed, these have been used to challenge the accuracy of speed cameras in court. Motorists in Prince George's County, Maryland, have successfully challenged tickets from Optotraffic speed cameras where they were incorrectly ticketed at over 15 mph over the limit. However, Prince George County no longer allows time-distance calculations as a defense in cases where "the equipment was calibrated and validated, or is self calibrating". The National Highway Traffic Safety Administration standards for "across the road radar" state that "If the ATR device is to be considered for unattended operation, the manufacturer shall provide a secondary method for verifying that the evidential recorded image properly identifies the target vehicle and reflects this vehicle's true speed, as described in §5.18.2. This may be accomplished by means of a second, appropriately delayed image showing the target vehicle crossing a specified reference line."

In January 2011, Edmonton, Alberta cancelled over 100,000 "Speed On Green" tickets issued in the previous 14 months due to concerns about camera reliability.

=== Surveillance ===
The use of cameras has raised concerns over the surveillance state by over-monitoring of public roads.

Groups like NHTSA (National Highway Traffic Safety Administration) have encouraged the usage of automated speed enforcement to help improve general road safety and to decrease crash rates.

- A concern with replacing in-person traffic stops with automated enforcement, where drivers receive tickets by mail, is the lack of officer interaction during these incidents. When an officer pulls someone over to conduct a traffic stop they are able to look at the driver and for instance see if the driver may be impaired as well as looking at the car itself to see if a plain view search could be conducted. When this is taken away by a ticket through the mail someone committing a crime would not be caught in this incident as they would if they had gotten pulled over in person.

=== Funding ===
- In May 2010, the new Coalition government said that the 'Labour's 13-year war on the motorist is over' and that the new government 'pledged to scrap public funding for speed cameras'. In July Mike Penning, the Road safety minister reduced the Road Safety Grant for the current year to Local Authorities from £95 million to £57 million, saying that local authorities had relied too heavily on safety cameras for far too long and that he was pleased that some councils were now focusing on other road safety measures. It is estimated that as a result, the Treasury is now distributing £40 million less in Road Safety Grant than is raised from fines in the year. Dorset and Essex announced plans to review camera provision with a view to possibly ending the scheme in their counties, however Dorset strongly affirmed its support for the scheme, albeit reducing financial contributions in line with the reduction in government grant. Seven counties also announced plans to turn off some or all of their cameras, amidst warnings from the country's most senior traffic policeman that this would result in an increase in deaths and injuries. Gloucestershire cancelled plans to update cameras and has reduced or cancelled maintenance contracts.
- In August 2010, the Oxfordshire, UK speed cameras were switched off because of lack of finance due to government funding policy changes. The cameras were switched back on in April 2011 after a new source of funding was found for them. Following rule changes on the threshold for offering "Speed Awareness Courses" as an alternative to a fine and licence points for drivers, and given that the compulsory fees charged for such courses go directly to the partnerships rather than directly to central government as is the case for fine revenues, the partnership will be able to fund its operations from course fees. Compared with the same period in the previous year with the cameras still switched on, the number of serious injuries that occurred during the same period with the cameras switched off was exactly the same – at 13 – and the number of slight injuries was 15 more at 70, resulting from 62 crashes – 2 more than when the cameras were still operating. There were no fatalities during either period.

=== Public opinion ===
- In 2002, the state of Hawaii experimented with speed limit enforcement vans but they were withdrawn months later due to public outcry.
- A 2002 Australian survey found that "The community generally believes that enforcement intensities should either stay the same or increase", with 40% of those surveyed saying that they thought that the number of speed cameras on the road should be increased, 43% saying that they thought the number should stay the same, and 13% saying that they thought that the number should be decreased.
- In 2005, the Virginia legislature declined to reauthorize its red light camera enforcement law after a study questioned their effectiveness, only to reverse itself in 2007 and allow cameras to return to any city with a population greater than 10,000.
- A 2007 literature review of the benefits and barriers to implementation of automated speed enforcement in the US. stated that "In general, the results of [public opinion] surveys indicate that a majority of respondents support automated enforcement. However, the margins of support vary widely, from a low of 51 percent in Washington, D.C. to a high of 77 percent in Scottsdale, Arizona." A 2014 study showed this number increase to 76 percent for support in Washington DC.
- In British Columbia, opinion polling by Research Co. between 2018 and 2023 have shown consistent 70 percent support for “speed on green” cameras that capture speeding vehicles that pass through an intersection above the limit on a red, yellow, or green light.
- Opinion polling in New York City from 2021 showed a 78 percent support for speed cameras in school zones and 60 percent support for speed cameras in other areas.
- In Ontario, speeding fines are doubled in areas identified as "Community Safety Zones". The Kathleen Wynne Liberal government developed the law allowing for automated speed enforcement in 2017, before the Doug Ford Conservative government passed the law in 2019. Ford announced legislation in October 2025 that would ban the use of speed cameras, calling them "cash grabs". The move came after many speed cameras in Toronto were vandalized. Over 20 mayors, including Olivia Chow of Toronto, spoke out against the proposed legislation, as well as municipalities, school boards, and police chiefs. On November 14, the Building a More Competitive Economy Act was passed, that struck the section of the Highway Traffic Act that permitted automated speed enforcement. Instead, the government launched a $210 million road safety initiatives fund for municipalities to implement traffic calming measures. Weeks after the ban, the Angus Reid Institute polled Ontarians and found that 49 percent thought it was the “wrong move” to ban speed cameras, 38 percent thought it was the “right move”, and 14 percent were unsure.

== Avoidance/evasion ==
A GPS map showing speed camera POI information overlaid onto it

To avoid detection or prosecution, drivers may:

- Brake just before a camera in order to travel past its sensor below the speed limit. This is, however, a cause of collisions. Or brake suddenly, which results in rear-end crashes.
- Use GPS navigation devices, such as Waze, which contain databases of known camera locations to alert them in advance. These databases may, in some cases, be updated in near-realtime. The use of GPS devices to locate speed cameras is illegal in some jurisdictions, such as France. In Australia, the use of GPS devices within the category of intelligent speed adaptation are being encouraged.
- Install active laser jammer or radar jammer devices which actively transmit signals that interfere with the measuring device. These devices are illegal in many jurisdictions.
- Remove, falsify, obscure or modify vehicle license plate. Tampering with number plates or misrepresenting them is illegal in most jurisdictions.
- Damage or destroy the cameras themselves.

In August 2010, a fast-driving Swiss driver reportedly avoided several older model speed cameras, but was detected by a new model, as traveling at 300 km/h (186 mph), resulting in the world's largest speeding fine to date. In the past, it was possible to avoid detection by changing lanes when SPECS average speed cameras were in use as they measured a vehicle's speed over distance in one lane only. Since 2007, measures were taken to mitigate this limitation. Although the cameras do operate in pairs on single lanes (it is a limitation of the technology not a restriction in the type approval) the authorities now install the cameras such that the monitored length of road overlaps between multiple camera pairs. The driver cannot tell which cameras are 'entry' and which are 'exit' making it difficult to know when to change lane.

== Gallery ==
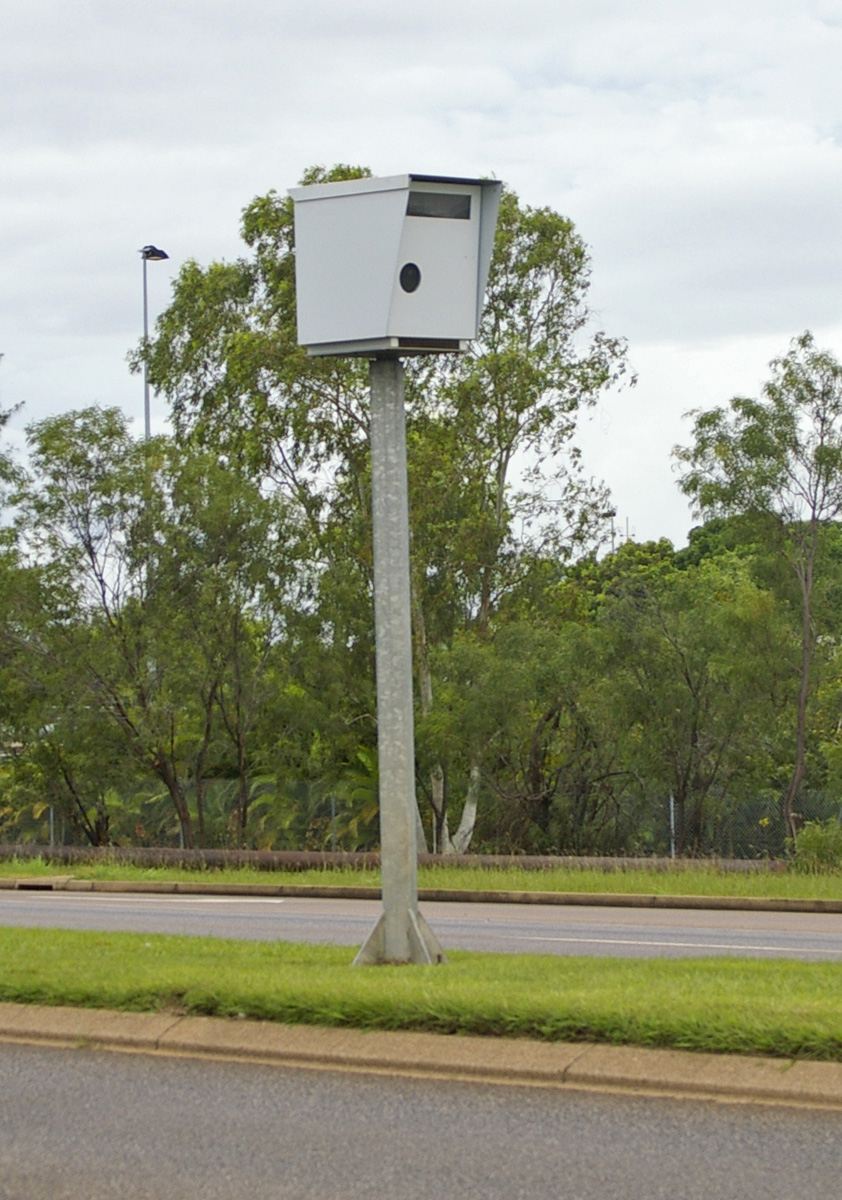
A red-light and speed camera in Darwin, Northern Territory, Australia

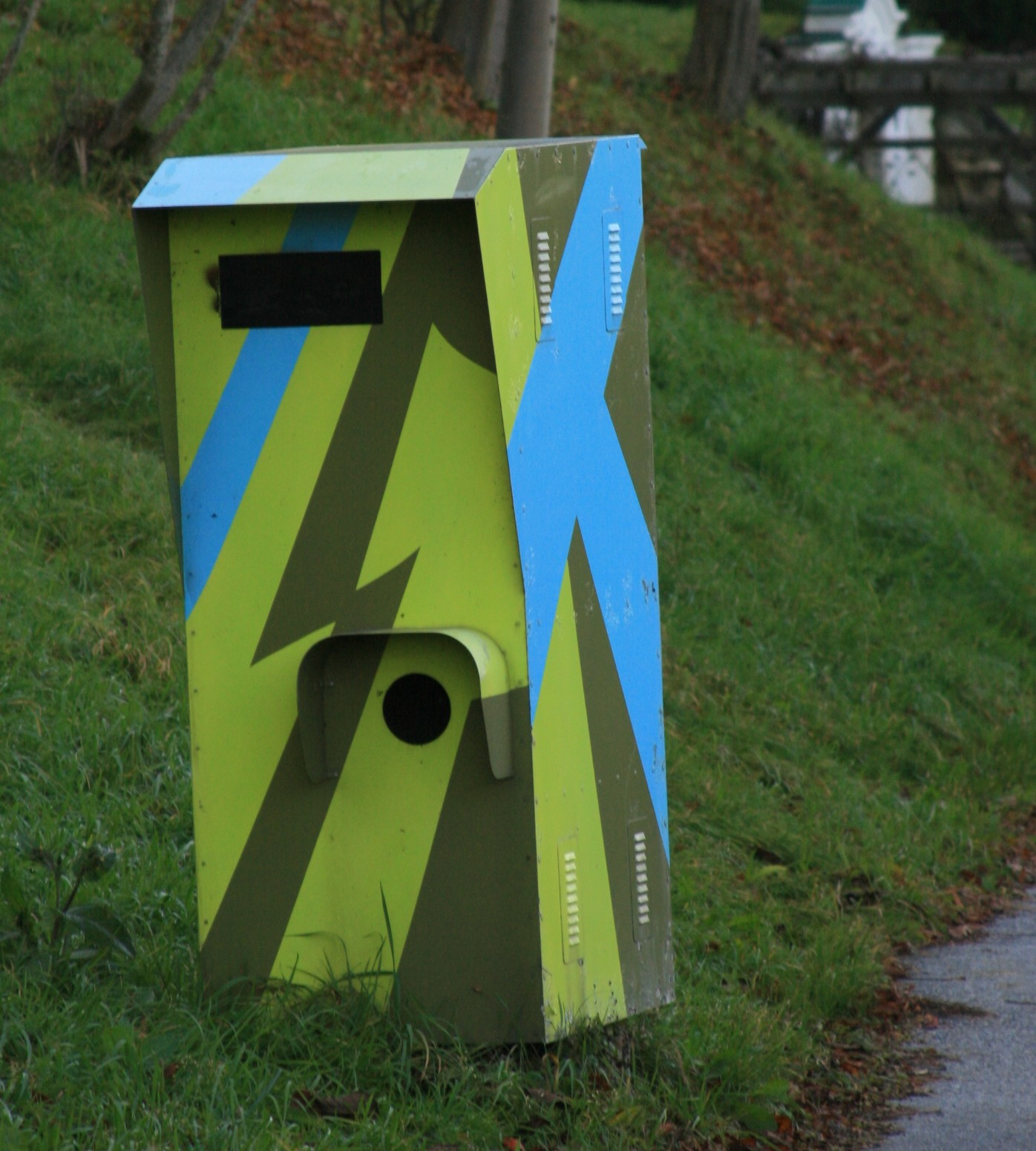
Dazzle camouflaged speed camera as an art project in Loipersdorf, Austria

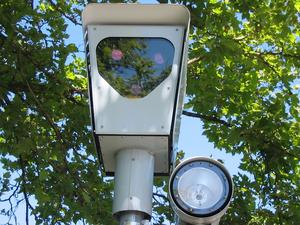
A red light camera in use in Beaverton, Oregon, US

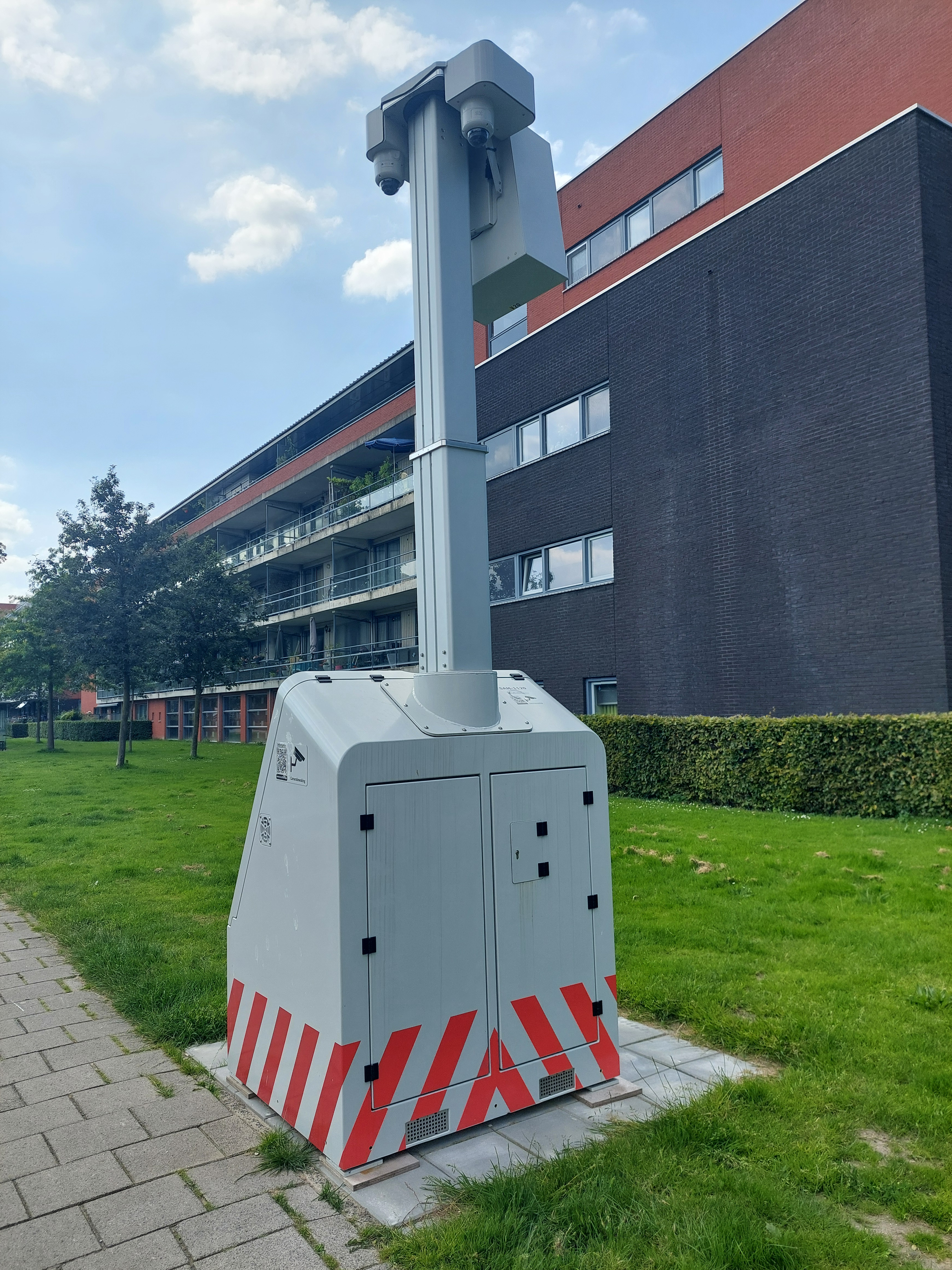
The mobile "flexflasher," (flexflitser in Dutch) was introduced in the Netherlands from 2022. It has its own power supply for 2 months 24/7.

== See also ==
- New York City speed camera program
- Road traffic safety
- Road traffic control
- Speed limit enforcement
- Road speed limit enforcement in Australia
- Safety Camera Partnership
- Traffic light
- Fourth and Sixth Amendment to the United States Constitution – which have been used to limit use of speed cameras in the United States.
- Home Office Type Approval
- Radar gun
- TEDES (traffic enforcement system) in Turkey
