= Athlete (disambiguation) =

An athlete is a person who participates regularly in a sport or sports that involve physical exertion, especially athletics (sports involving competitive running, jumping, throwing and walking).

Athlete or athletes may also refer to:

- ATHLETE (All-Terrain Hex-Legged Extra-Terrestrial Explorer), a lunar rover under development by NASA
- Athlete (band), an English indie rock band
  - Athlete (EP), a 2002 EP by Athlete
- "Athlete", a song from the album Bad Habits by Nav, 2019
- "Athlete", a song from Love, Victor: Season 1 (Original Soundtrack) in Love, Victor, 2020
- "Athlete", a song from the album Angie by Spill Tab, 2025
- "Athlete", a song from the album Kiari by Offset, 2025
- Athlete (2010 film), a sports documentary film
- Athlete (2019 film), a Japanese film
- Athletes (moth), a genus of Saturniinae moth
- Athletes (film), a 1925 German silent film
- Athletes (1977 series), paintings by American artist Andy Warhol

== See also ==
- Athletic (disambiguation)
- Athletics (disambiguation)
- The Athlete (disambiguation)
- Mathlete, a person who competes in mathematics competitions
