= Athletic =

Athletic may refer to:

- An athlete, a sportsperson
- Athletic director, a position at many American universities and schools
- Athletic type, a physical/psychological type in the classification of Ernst Kretschmer
- Athletic of Philadelphia, a baseball team of the 1870s

== Football clubs ==
- Annan Athletic F.C., a Scottish football club
- Alloa Athletic F.C., a Scottish football club
- Athletic Club, a Spanish football club based in Bilbao
  - Athletic Club Femenino, women's team of the above
  - Bilbao Athletic, men's reserve team of the above
- Athletic Club Ajaccio, a French football club.
- Athletico SC, a Lebanese association football academy
  - Athletico SC Women, women's team of the above
- Atlético Madrid, a Spanish football club
- Charlton Athletic F.C., an English football club
- Carshalton Athletic F.C., an English football club
- AFC Croydon Athletic, an English football club
- Dunfermline Athletic F.C., a Scottish football club
- Forfar Athletic F.C., a Scottish football club
- Oldham Athletic A.F.C., an English football club
- Senglea Athletic F.C., a Maltese football club
- Wigan Athletic F.C., an English football club

== Other uses ==
- Athletic Television, a North Korean television channel

== See also ==
- Athlete (disambiguation)
- Athletic club (disambiguation)
- Athletic Park, Wellington, New Zealand, a former sports ground mainly used for rugby union
- Athletics (disambiguation)
- The Athletic, sports website
- Atlético (disambiguation)
