= Athlete (2010 film) =

- Promotional poster
- Directed by: Dave Lam
- Produced by: Dave Lam
- Starring: Artie Elefant; Carrie Neveldine; Jenny Hinshaw; Kellie Smirnoff; Lance Armstrong; Chris Carmichael; Paula Radcliffe; Frank Shorter
- Edited by: Dave Lam
- Music by: Moby
- Distributed by: Gare du Nord Pictures LLC
- Release date: March 9, 2010
- Running time: 95 minutes
- Country: United States
- Language: English

Athlete (also styled as ATHLETE) is a 2010 sports documentary film directed, edited and produced by Dave Lam that examines the popularity of endurance sports through the profiles of four individuals – a cancer survivor, a blind senior citizen and twin sisters – who compete in marathons and triathlons. The film was released on DVD and video on demand on March 9, 2010.

== Athletes profiled ==
The film's principal subjects are:

- Jenny Hinshaw, a 38-year-old survivor of Hodgkin's lymphoma and member of Team in Training member;
- Artie Elefant, a 61-year-old athlete who is blind due to retinitis pigmentosa; member of the Achilles Track Club;
- Carrie Neveldine and Kellie Smirnoff, 35-year-old twins training for their first Ironman triathlon.

== Production ==
Filming was on location in the United States, beginning in September 2006 and lasting 12 months. The locations featured are:

- New York City;
- Syracuse and Lake Placid, New York;
- Long Branch, New Jersey;
- Miami and Jacksonville, Florida;
- Raleigh-Durham and Boone, North Carolina;
- Lake Winnipesaukee, New Hampshire;
- Washington, D.C.

== Races ==
Races featured in the documentary:

- New York City Marathon
- New Jersey Marathon
- Miami Marathon
- Ironman Lake Placid Triathlon
- Mighty North Fork Triathlon
- Tupper Lake Tinman Triathlon
- Finger Lakes Triathlon
- New York City Triathlon
- Rochester Autumn Classic Duathlon
- Achilles Hope & Possibility 5-Mile Run/Walk
- Five Boro Bike Tour

== Cameos ==
- Lance Armstrong, former seven-time Tour de France champion and cancer survivor;
- Chris Carmichael, Lance Armstrong's coach and founder of Carmichael Training Systems;
- Paula Radcliffe, women's marathon world-record holder and three-time New York City Marathon champion;
- Frank Shorter, marathon legend and 1972 Summer Olympics gold medalist;
- Dick Traum, founder of the Achilles Track Club;
- Dr. Joseph Moore, hematologist and oncologist at the Duke University Medical Center.
