= Cycling in New York City =

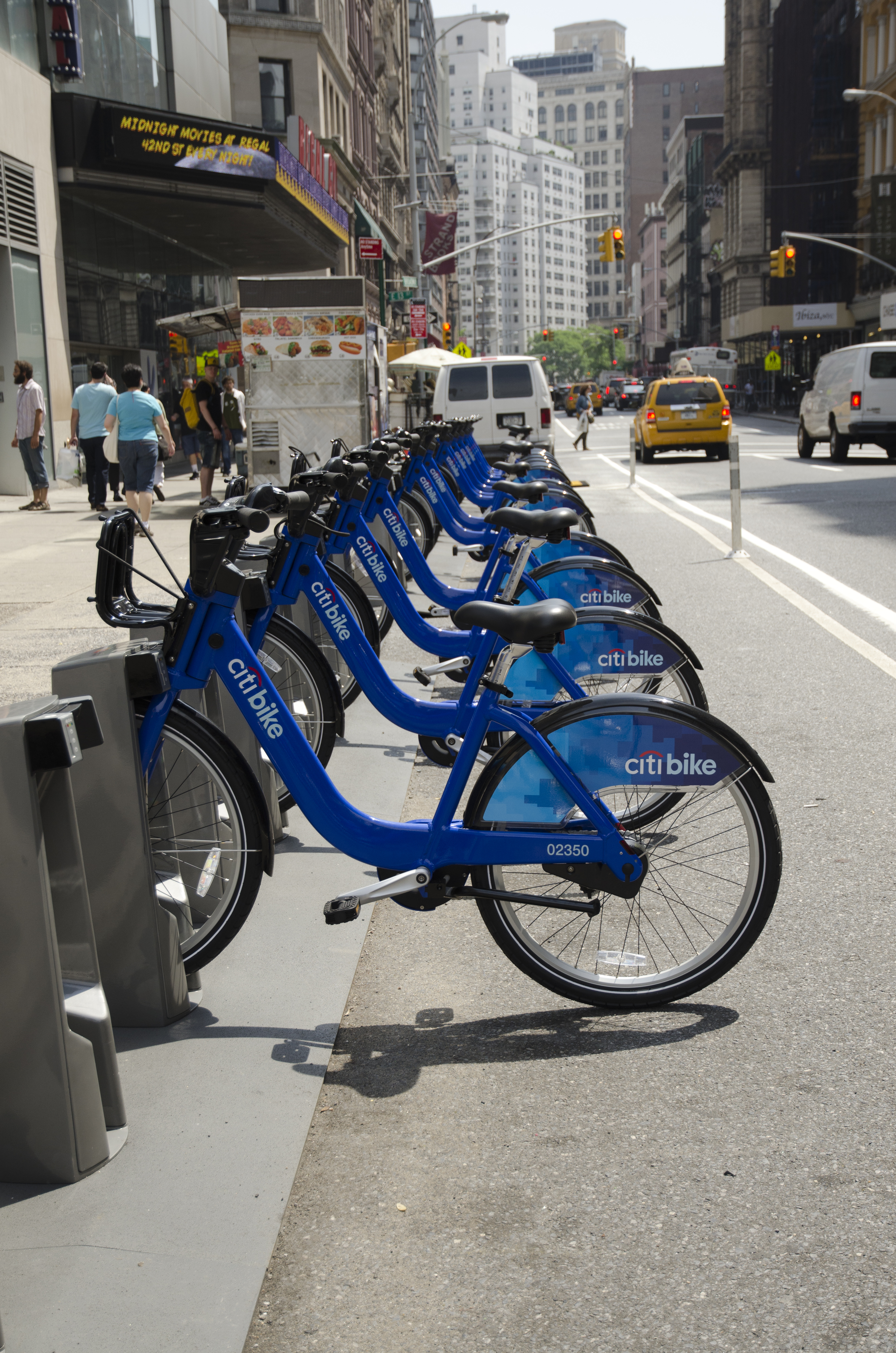
Citi Bike bike share service, which started in May 2013

Cycling in New York City is associated with mixed cycling conditions that include dense urban proximities, relatively flat terrain, congested roadways with stop-and-go traffic, and streets with heavy pedestrian activity. The city's large cycling population includes utility cyclists, such as delivery and messenger services; cycling clubs for recreational cyclists; and increasingly commuters. Cycling is increasingly popular in New York City: in 2018 there were approximately 510,000 daily bike trips, compared with 170,000 daily bike trips in 2005.

== History ==
=== Early days ===
The bicycle boom of the late 19th century had a strong impact in the area. New York did not manufacture as many bicycles as other cities, and imported many from elsewhere, including Freehold Township, New Jersey. As a spectator sport, six-day racing was popular and spurred the building of velodromes in suburbs including Washington Heights, Manhattan, and Jersey City, New Jersey.

Weekly races were held in suburban roads, including Pelham Parkway in the Bronx. The biggest races were in inner city locations, notably at the original Madison Square Garden which had been designed for cycle racing and at the time was located adjacent to Madison Square. The Olympic sport, Madison Racing, is named after cycle races that became popular at Madison Square Garden.

Several of the mid-20th-century parkway projects of Robert Moses included bike paths; however, when more people could afford cars, bicycling declined and the bikeways fell into disrepair. Provisions for pedestrians and bicyclists were not included in the bridges connecting Queens to the Bronx (Throgs Neck Bridge and Bronx–Whitestone Bridge), and Brooklyn to Staten Island (Verrazzano–Narrows Bridge). Since July 2018, buses along the Q50 route, which travels across the Bronx-Whitestone Bridge, contain bike racks at the front of each vehicle.

=== Late 20th century ===
Late in the century, bicycling resurged. Inspired by a trip to China in early 1980, Mayor Ed Koch ordered 6-foot-wide (1.8 m) buffered bike lanes to be built on some Manhattan streets. Opened in October, the lanes were protested by merchants as well as taxi and trucking interests, while garages and other businesses unsuccessfully sued to stop construction. NYCDOT reported that cycling traffic had doubled while the number of crashes remained unchanged, though it also reported an average of 5 to 10 minutes' extra travel time for drivers, compared to before the bike lanes' installation. In June 1981, the Mayor ordered removal of bike lane barriers due to controversy and a decline in cyclists using the lanes (estimated at 10–15 thousand a day). The lanes were removed by November. A narrow, physically separated bike lane on Sixth Avenue in Midtown Manhattan remained as a remnant of the Koch lanes.

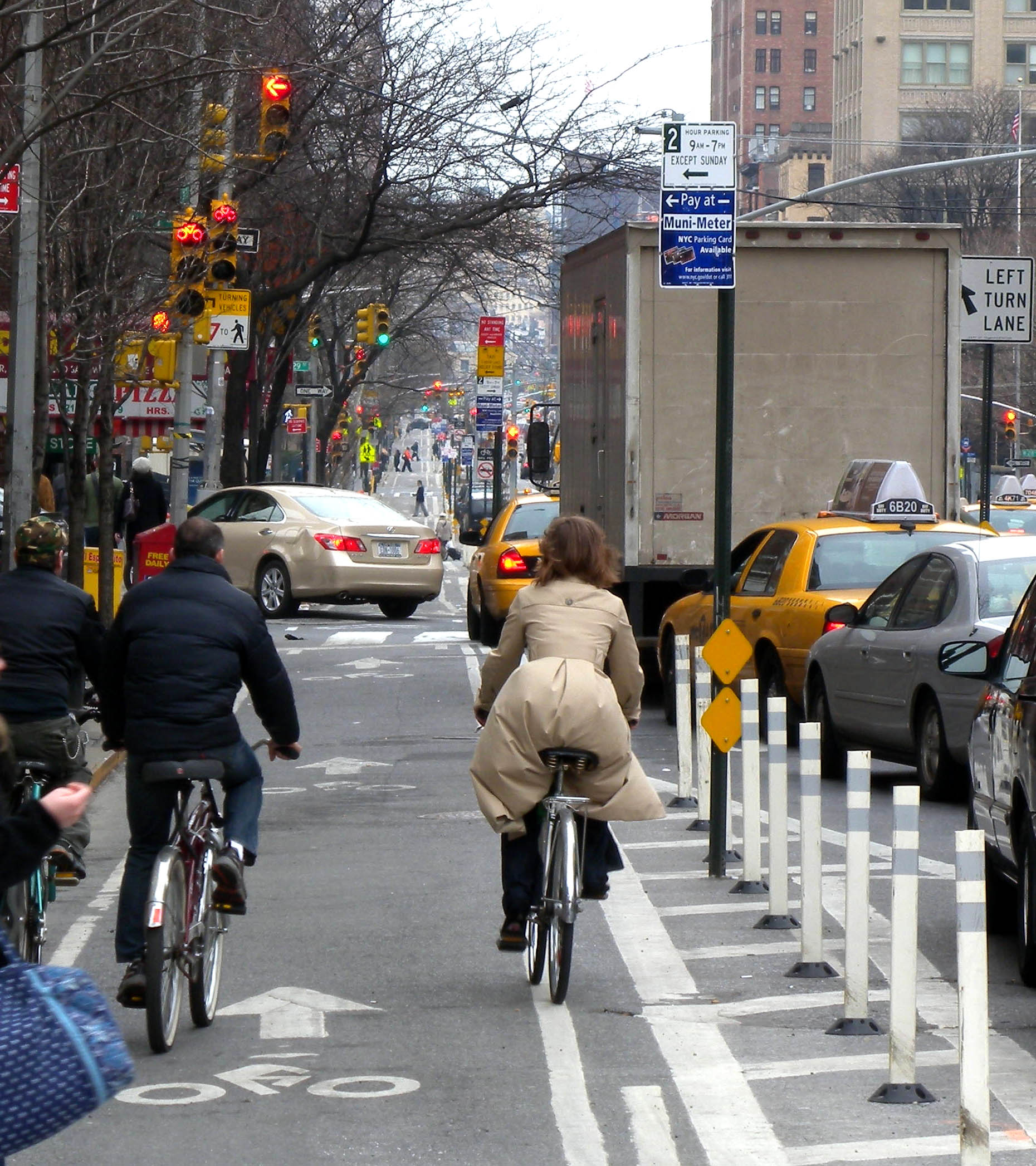
The 9th Avenue bicycle lane in Chelsea, Manhattan pictured in 2009

According to a 1990 survey, less than 1% of vehicle trips in New York City were made by bicycle, but in 1991, over 75,000 New Yorkers used bicycles to commute to work each day. That year, Senator Daniel Patrick Moynihan introduced legislation that became the Intermodal Surface Transportation Efficiency Act of 1991 (ISTEA).

=== 21st century ===
Bike lanes on major bridges were created, refurbished, or improved, and the New York City Department of Parks and Recreation, in partnership with other agencies, created the Manhattan Waterfront Greenway, Brooklyn-Queens Greenway and other bikeways. The Department of Parks and Recreation added a vendor program to provide "hop on, hop off" bicycle rental services across various city parks. The linked network of bicycle rentals is facilitated through concessions in Central Park, Riverside South, West Harlem Piers Park, and the Battery.

By 2017, there were 450,000 bike rides per day in New York City, up from 180,000 per day in 2006. Of these, 20% were commuter trips. Between 2014 and 2019, during the mayoralty of Bill de Blasio, over 340 miles (550 km) of bike lanes were added, bringing the city's total to over 1,350 miles (2,170 km).

Transportation commissioner Polly Trottenberg pushed for increasing bike lanes to demonstrate the city's progress and commitment to transportation safety. However, with the expansion of cycling in New York City, there has been pushback from motorists. For example, in 2019, motorists and Upper West Side residents objected after 200 parking spaces along Central Park West were eliminated to allow bike lane expansion.

== Types ==
=== Utility cycling ===
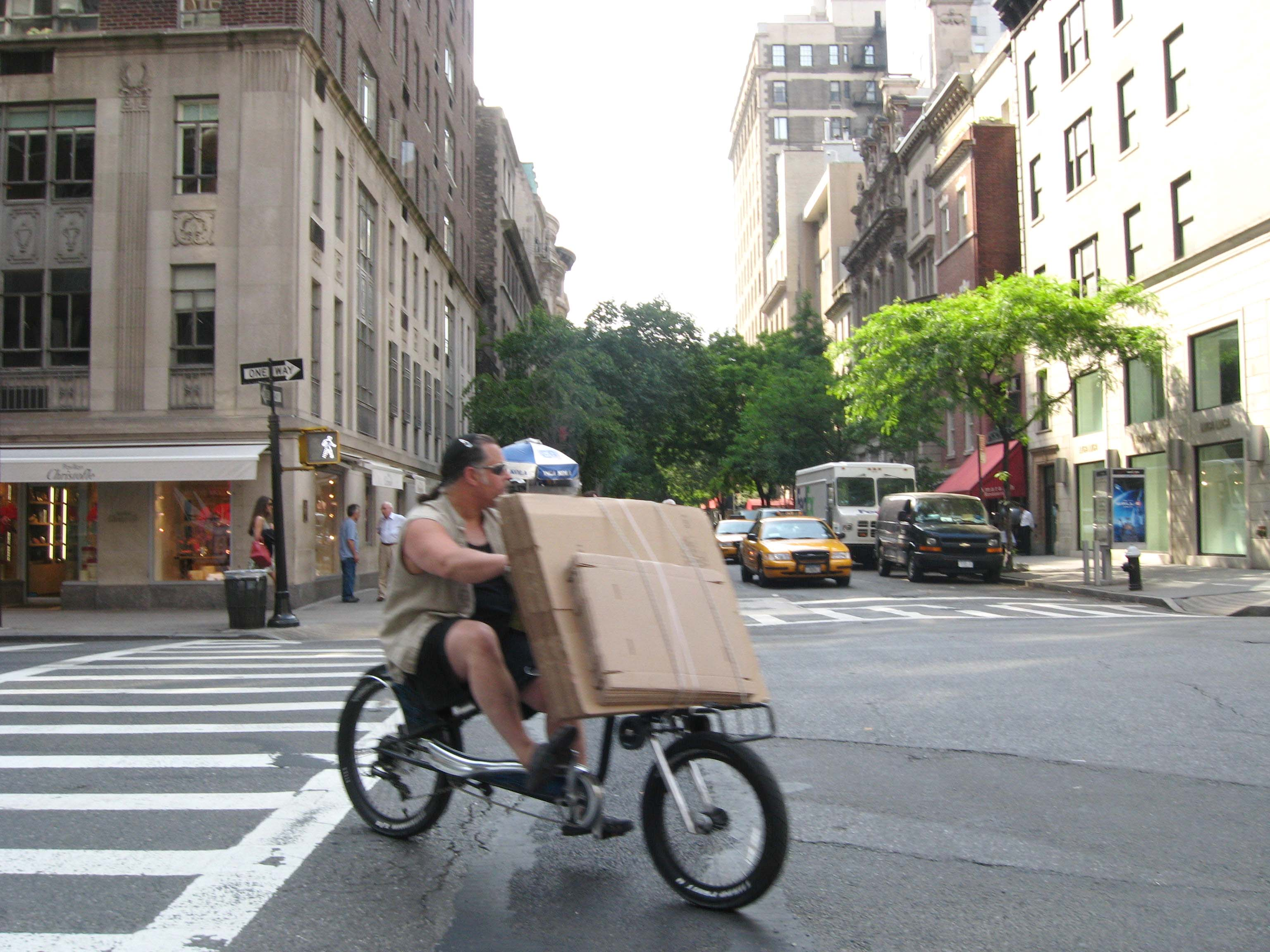
Carrying boxes on Madison Avenue, 2008

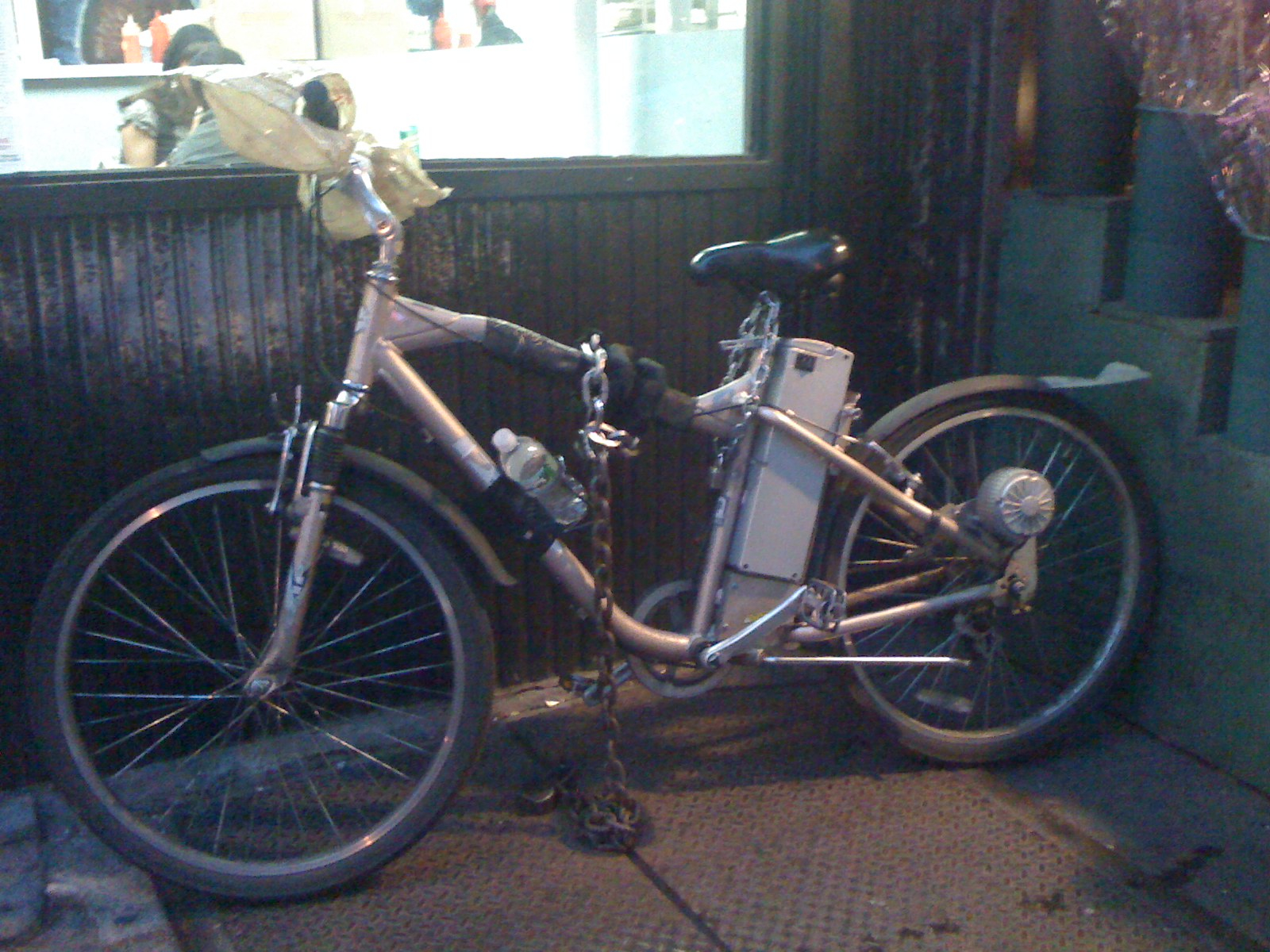
Motorized delivery bike for a restaurant, with chain, lock, and plastic bags on handles to protect from winter wind

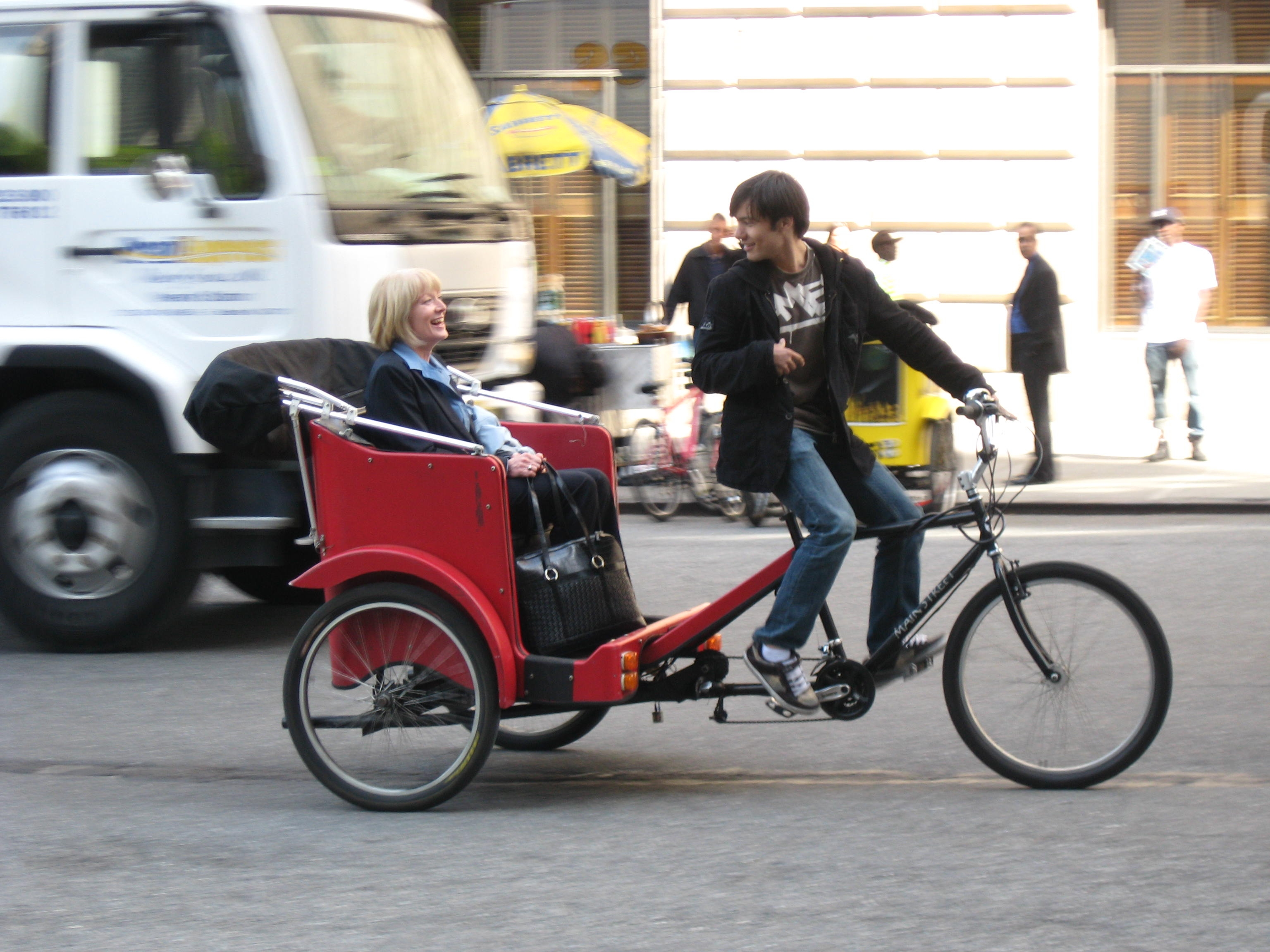
A pedicab with passenger pictured in Midtown in 2008

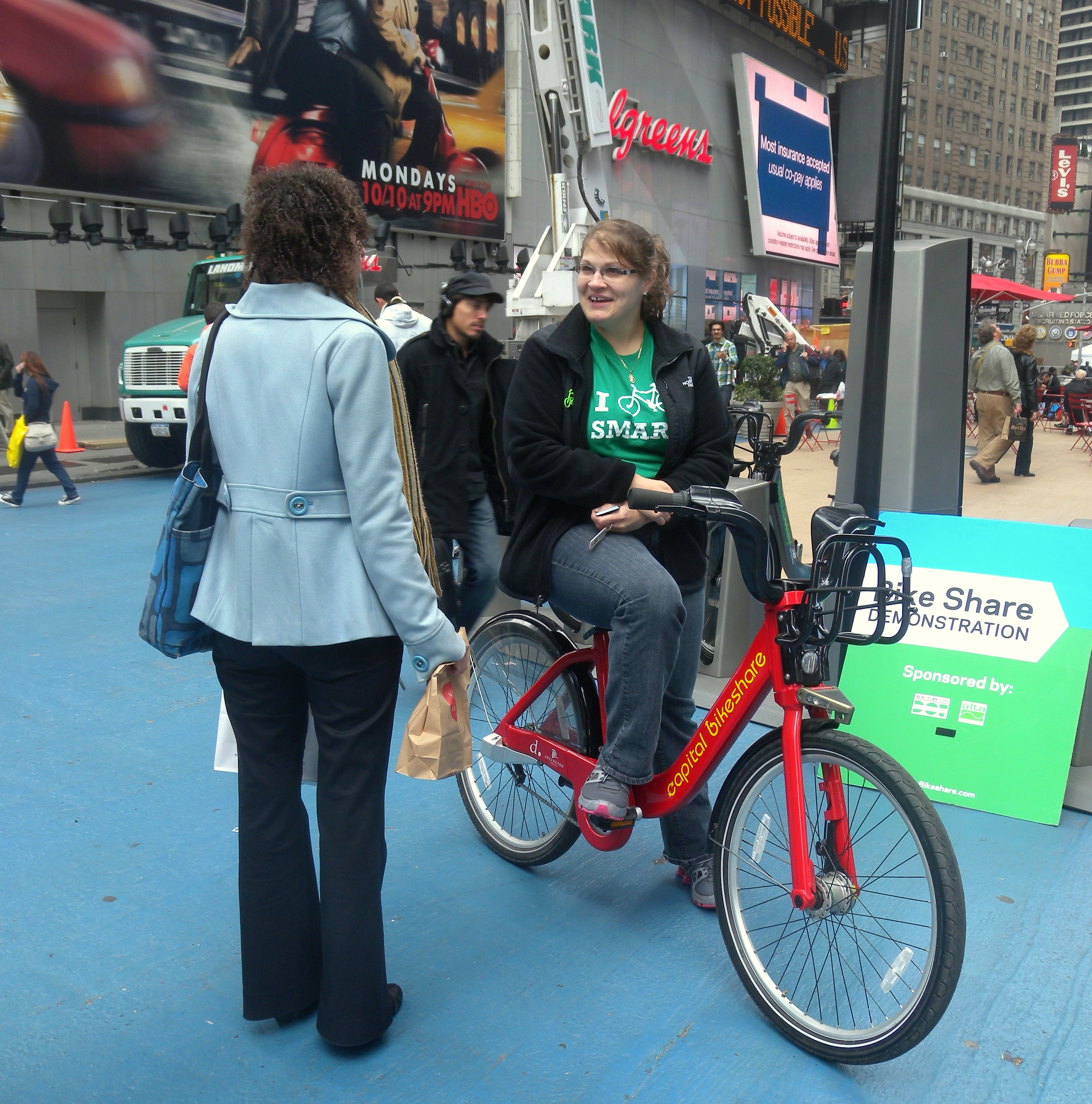
Demonstration of bike share before Citi Bike was implemented, Times Square

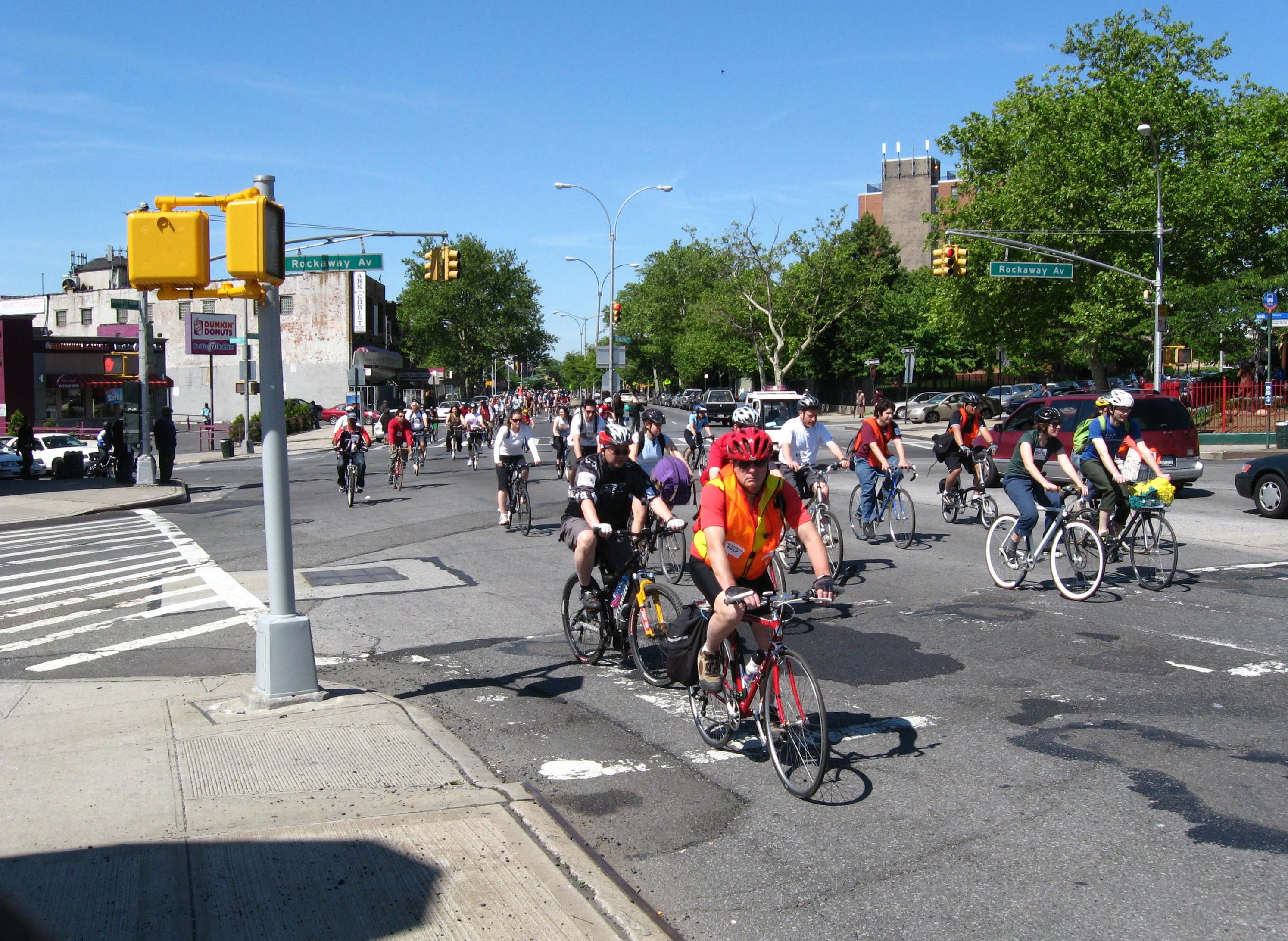
A recreational group bicycle ride in Brooklyn in 2008

Delivery bikes are commonly used in New York for fast food deliveries over short distances, sometimes using mountain bikes outfitted with a wide carrier for larger loads such as pizza or other accessories. Bicycle messengers use narrower wheels to carry lighter loads short distances. Specialized cargo bicycles and tricycles carry heavier loads. Electric bicycles are increasingly used for this service; the bikes were initially illegal (although enforcement was sporadic), but legalized in 2020. Proposals in the New York State Legislature in 2015 would define, legalize and regulate certain "electric assist bicycles" with small electric motors.

Pedicabs became commonplace at the turn of the 21st century, offering novel travel over short distances, including guided tours of Central Park. In April 2007 the New York City Council voted to limit the number of pedicabs to 325. A court overturned the limit, later regulatory efforts concentrated on requirements for insurance and safety equipment and in April 2011, new legislation tightened parking regulations and capped pedicab licenses at 850.

=== Bicycle sharing ===
In 2007 the department studied the prospects of a bicycle sharing system and announced in 2011 that kiosks would be built for the service to begin in 2012. The project was slated to introduce 10,000 bikes that would be available from 600 stations made by PBSC Urban Solutions and operated by Alta Bicycle Share, the operators of similar schemes in other U.S. cities.

Citigroup bought a five-year sponsorship, and as a result, the bike-share system was named Citi Bike. Stations in the first stage were located between 59th Street in Manhattan, the Hudson River, Atlantic Avenue in Brooklyn, and Bushwick Avenue. The system opened for business in May 2013 with 330 stations and 4,300 bikes. In October 2014, Citi Bike and the city announced a price increase and a plan to expand the program to add thousands of bikes and hundreds of stations, to cover most of Manhattan and several other areas.

After Citi Bike was launched, the city also started experimented with dockless bike sharing, wherein bikes do not need to be returned to a dock after the trip is complete. The bikes would instead lock themselves into place, and can only be used once a cyclist pays using an online application. In early August 2017, the dockless bike-sharing company Spin had started a dockless operation in the Rockaways, but had been told to cease and desist operations by the NYCDOT, which had licensed Citi Bike as the only official bike-share operator in New York City. In July 2018, the city rolled out a dockless bike-sharing pilot in conjunction with five companies, with 200 bikes provided in each of three outer-borough neighborhoods.

Research conducted by Quinnipiac University Polling Institute in June 2013 showed that a majority of New Yorkers support the initiative.

=== Recreational ===
Some parks ban or restrict motor vehicles to promote bicycling, including Central Park and Prospect Park. Bike and Roll NYC operates bike rental stations in several city parks and local bike shops also rent them, especially in areas of tourism. Less formal operators work on street corners or out of the back of a truck or in parking garages, although this type of operation is illegal on city park property. Additional services include paid guided tours.

Several organizations, including Five Borough Bicycle Club and Bike New York, conduct tours every weekend. Most are day trips for no fee; some larger or overnight tours require payment. New York City is host to several long annual recreational rides, including the Five Boro Bike Tour. New York Cycle Club and others specialize in fitness and speed. Bicycle track races run most summer weekends in Kissena Park and elsewhere. Road races are held on weekends and some weekday evenings at Prospect Park, Central Park, and Floyd Bennett Field.

=== Commuting ===
Like other forms of cycling in New York City, commuting by bicycle has increased significantly over the years. In 2015, 46,057 people said they used a bicycle as their primary mode of commuting, compared with just 16,468 who commuted primarily by bicycle in 2005. Commuters accounted for approximately one fifth of bicycle trips in New York City in 2017. Many New Yorkers live less than 12 mi (19 km) from their job, and can be seen bicycle commuting over various bridges connecting Manhattan with the outer boroughs, along the Hudson River Park bicycle path, or elsewhere. In 2008 the NYC Department of Transportation released a "screenline count report" suggesting that commuter cycling had more than doubled since the turn of the century.

For mixed-mode commuting most suburban commuter rail stations provide free parking in racks, and some have bicycle lockers for security. Regulations on bicycles on trains vary by railroad and time of day; until 2021 Metro-North and LIRR required a permit. New Jersey Transit also allows bicycles onboard trains en route to New York City but restricts them on rush hour trains.

Bikes are allowed on New York City Subway trains at all hours, though it is sometimes difficult to fit a bike into a packed subway car. Typically, cyclists use the subway security gates to bring bicycles into the system, and board either the very first or very last train car. Due to traffic patterns and transport network geometries, mixed-mode bicycling-plus-subway can be the fastest way to commute, or to achieve transport within New York City, for many routes and times.

Folding bicycles, which often allow parking in a workplace or home closet where there isn't room for a full sized bike, became increasingly popular early in the 21st century. European city bikes from the Netherlands, though lacking this virtue, became a lesser trend in 2008.

In 2009, a city law required commercial buildings with freight elevators to allow employees to transport their bikes on them up to tenant floors to allow access to indoor storage spaces to encourage commuting by cycling. Another 2009 law required many off-street parking facilities to replace some of their spaces for vehicles with bicycle racks. So far there has been limited demand by cyclists for paid off-street bicycle parking at these garages and lots. The Alliance for Downtown New York, a local Business Improvement District, announced in late 2018 that the Oonee Company would install a new kind of secure bike pod for parking on Whitehall Street. In 2024, the NYCDOT announced plans to install secure bike-parking facilities at 500 locations.

The non-profit organization Transportation Alternatives promotes bicycle commuting and bicycle friendly facilities to lessen the impact of cars on urban life. On its website, the organization states that is "working to make New York City's neighborhoods safer and restore a vibrant culture of street life" and advocates "for safer, smarter transportation and a healthier city."

Renting, parking, and shopping for bikes

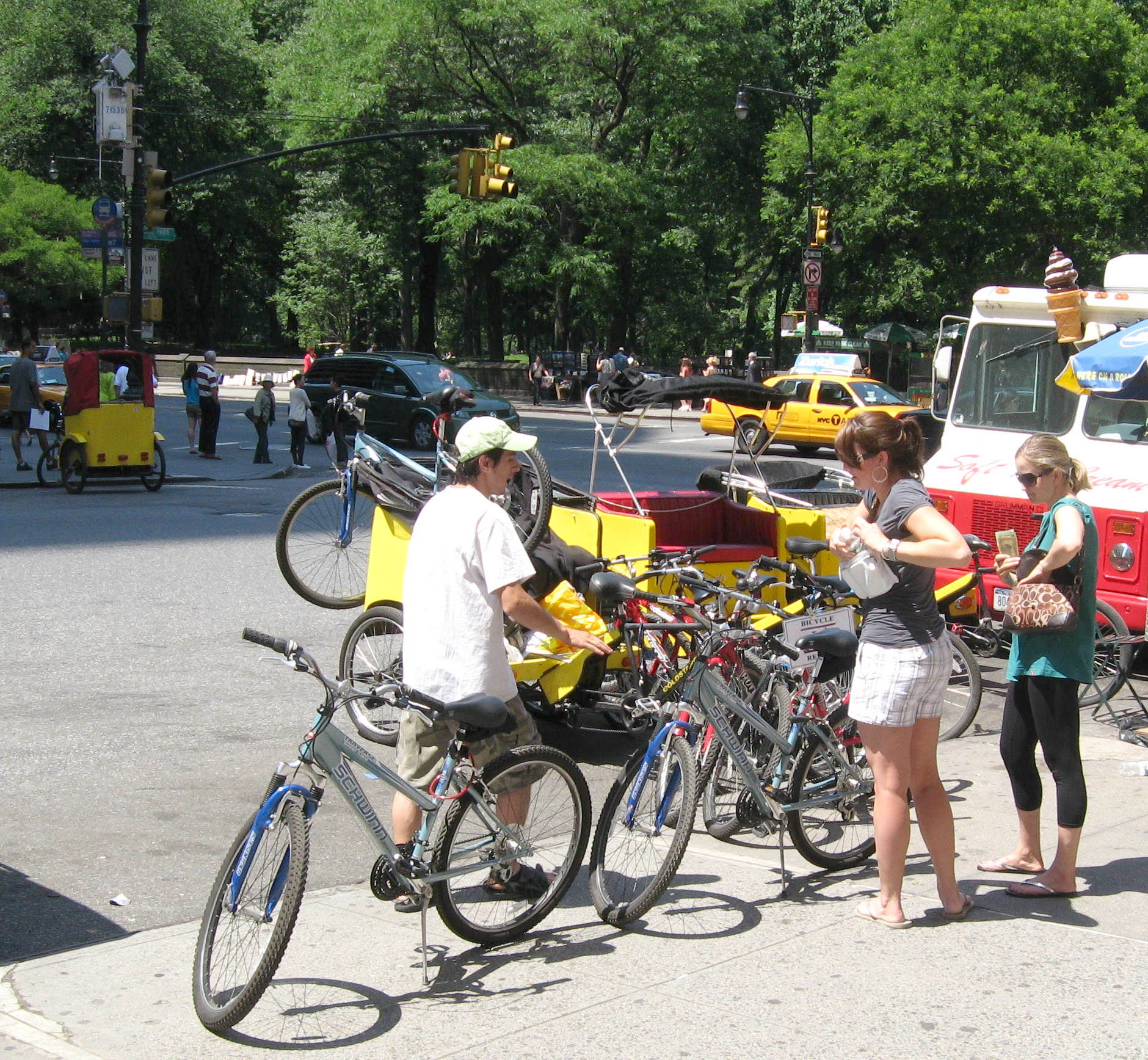
Renting, outside Artisans Gate, Central Park

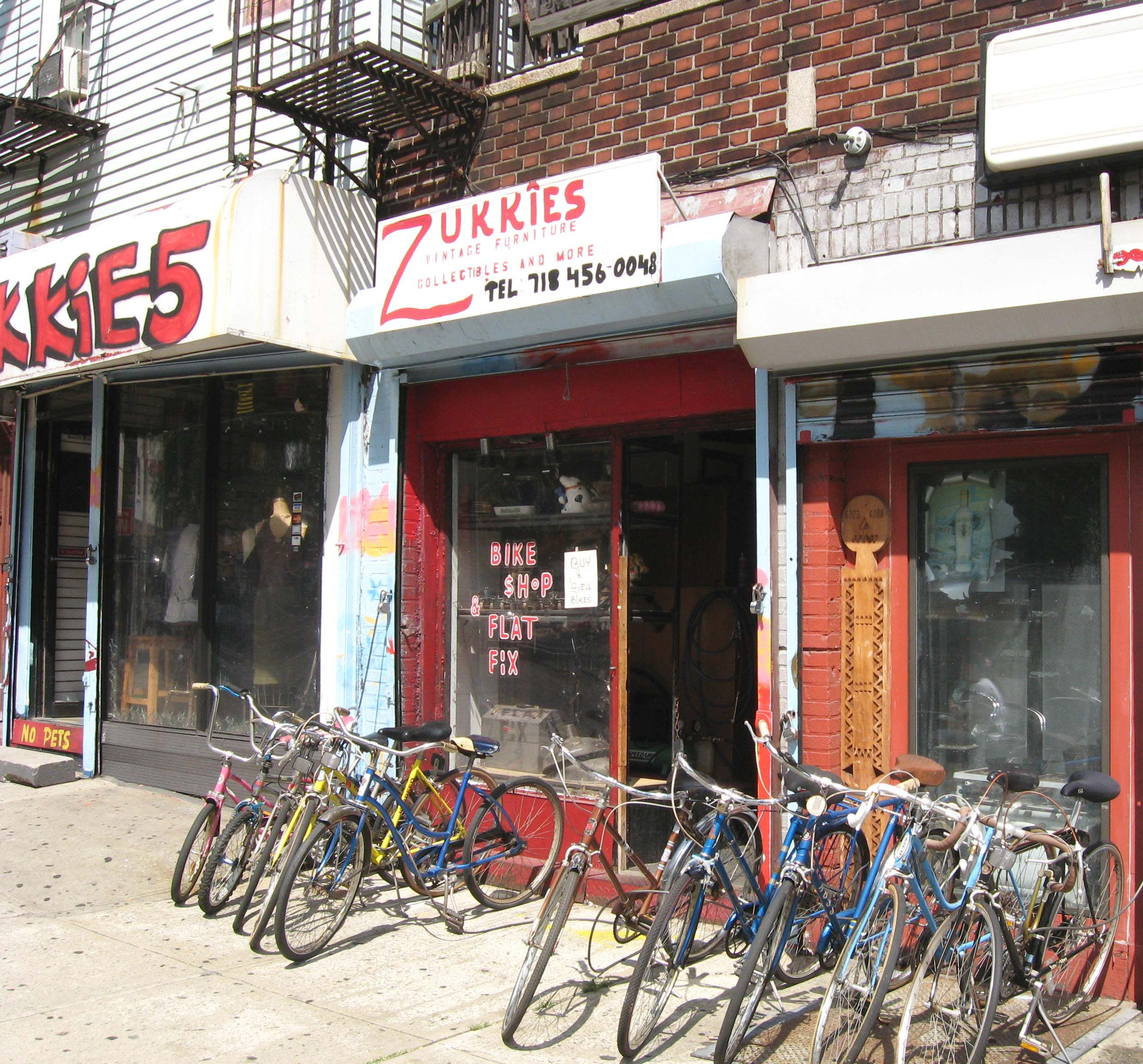
Bike shop in East Williamsburg, Brooklyn

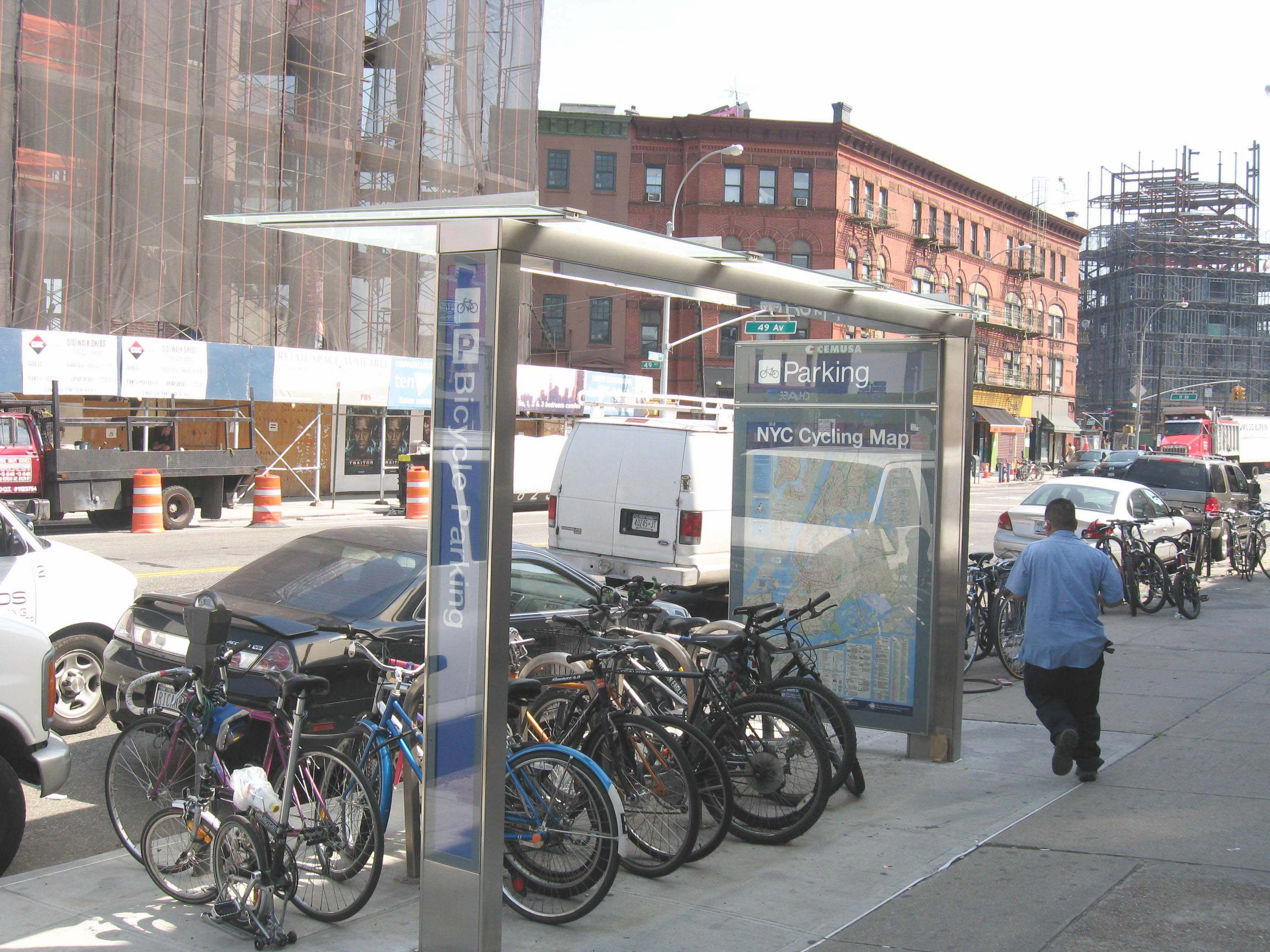
Parking under a bike shelter in Long Island City near Pulaski Bridge

== Parking ==
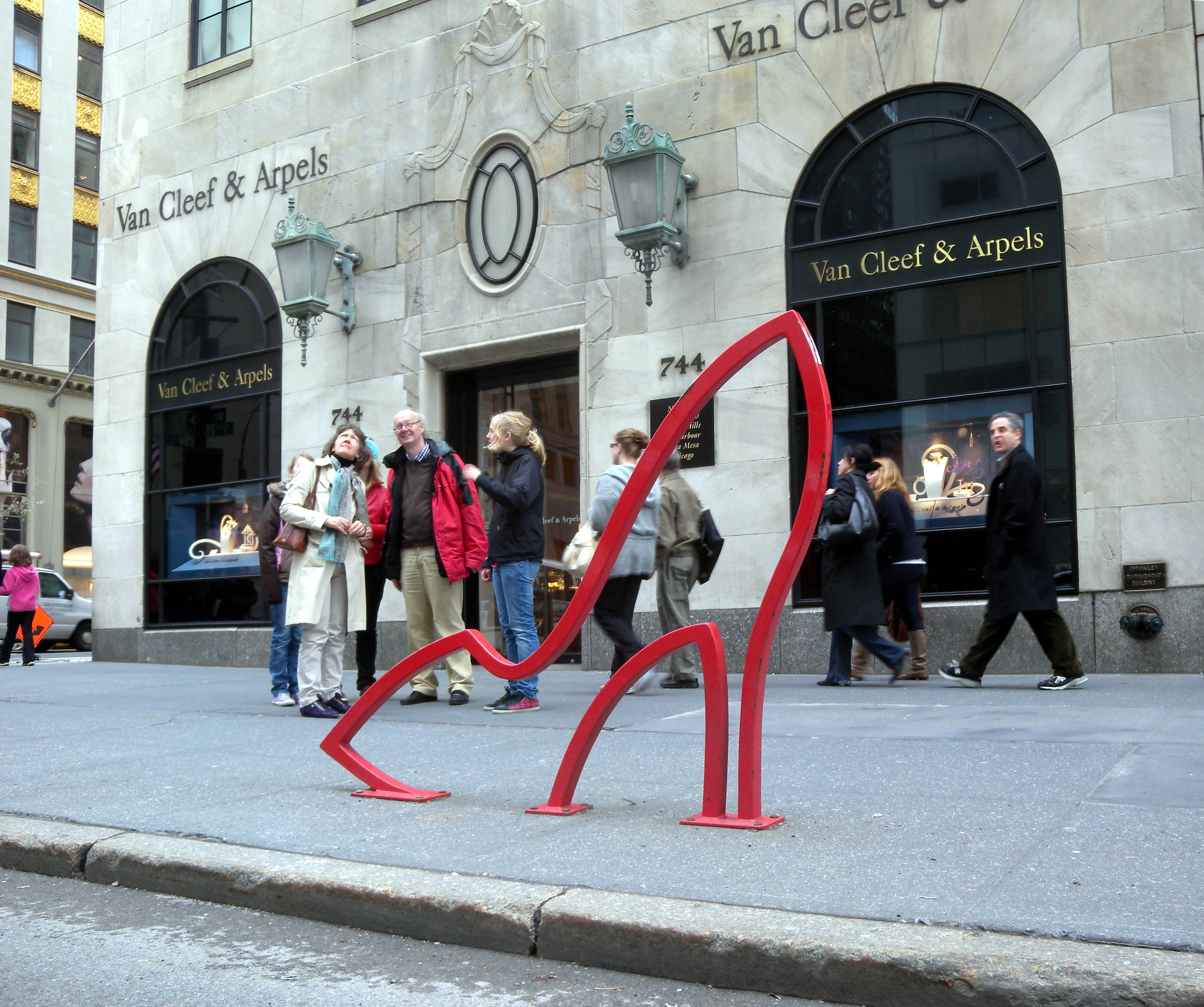
Rack titled The Ladies's Mile placed near Bergdorf Goodman on 5th Avenue between 57th and 58th (2008)

In 2008, David Byrne designed a series of bicycle parking racks in the form of image outlines corresponding to the areas in which they were located, such as a dollar sign for Wall Street and an electric guitar in Williamsburg, Brooklyn. Byrne worked with a manufacturer who constructed the racks in exchange for the right to sell them later as art. The plans were accepted by New York City Department of Transportation and installed in NYC between July 2008 and July 2009.

Two bike racks constructed from the Byrne Bike Rack Alphabet, a system of modular letter segments that can be combined to form words, remain installed at the Brooklyn Academy of Music.

== Bike lanes ==
The growth of protected cycling infrastructure from 1997 - 2023

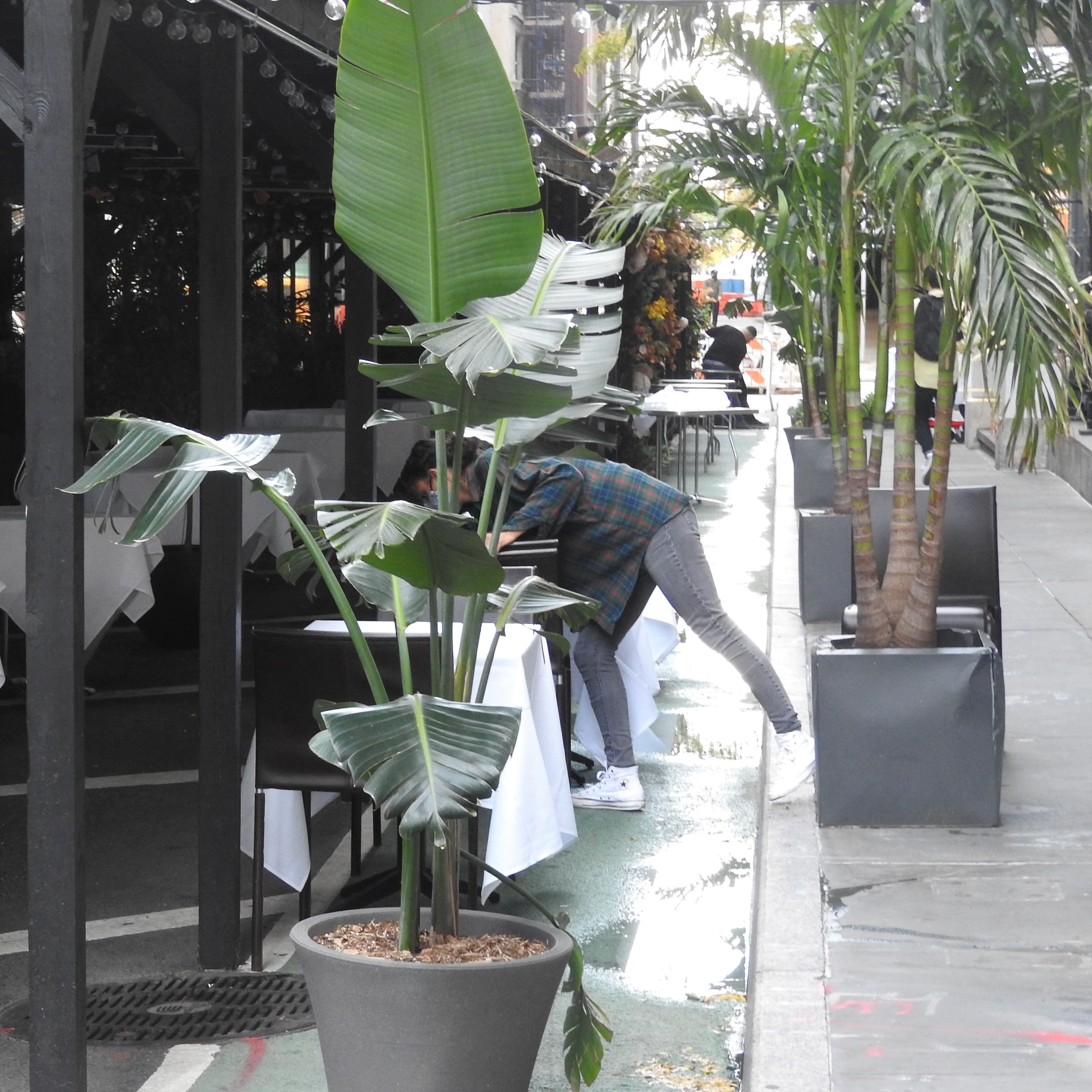
Bicycle lane partially blocked by activity from an outdoor dining structure during the COVID-19 pandemic

As of 2019, New York City had 1,350 miles (2,170 km) of bike lanes, compared to 513 miles (826 km) of bike lanes in 2006. The New York City Department of Transportation distributes a free and annually updated bike map online and through bike shops.

=== Types ===
There are three types of bike lanes on New York City streets: Class I, Class II, and Class III. Class I bike lanes are typically physically separated from vehicular/pedestrian paths. Class II bike lanes are simply marked with paint and signage and lie between a parking lane and a traffic lane. Class III bike lanes are shared vehicular/bike lanes, usually only marked by signage and sharrows. The majority of bike lanes in New York are Class II or Class III bike lanes.

==== Class I ====
Between 2007 and 2018, New York City added just over 100 miles of Class I bike lanes. As of the end of 2018, there were 16 corridors with Class I bike lanes. In 2019, the city announced that an additional 250 miles (400 km) of Class I bike lanes would be built starting in 2021. At that point, there were 126 miles (203 km) of Class I bike lanes citywide.

One of the most heavily used Class I bike lanes is the Hudson River Greenway, which is segregated from pedestrians. Other parts of the Manhattan Waterfront Greenway and the Brooklyn-Queens Greenway are less continuously segregated. An east-west greenway runs through Pelham Bay Park and Pelham Parkway in the Bronx, connecting via Mosholu Parkway to Van Cortlandt Park, which in turn connects to the South County Trailway.

Greenways are prevalent along major parkways: the Bronx River Parkway, Hutchinson River Parkway, Eastern Parkway, and Ocean Parkway. Others include foreshoreways along the north shore of Jamaica Bay and the south shores of Little Neck Bay and Flushing Bay. Some boardwalks such as the Rockaway Beach Boardwalk, the Riegelmann Boardwalk, and the South Beach Boardwalk allow bicycles at some times. Several destinations such as Central Park, Prospect Park, and Governors Island contain extensive Class 1 bike lane networks.

Class I bike lanes are the safest road design for cyclists and are credited with helping increase the number of cyclists in the city while reducing crashes and injuries to all road users. Between 2009 and 2014, cyclists riding in parking protected bike lanes experienced a 75% reduction in crash-related injuries, while pedestrians on those routes experienced a 22% decrease in crash-related injuries.

=== Criticism ===
Despite their documented safety benefits, some have been critical of bike lanes. A group in Park Slope sued in March 2011 to remove a new bike lane, and in November the City Council voted to slow the installation of new lanes and pedestrian plazas. Much of the opposition has been concentrated in Manhattan and Queens, where opponents claim that bike lanes are a nuisance or danger to pedestrians and nearby businesses. However, an August 2012 survey found two-thirds of New Yorkers in favor of bike lanes.

=== History ===
In response to the bicycle boom of the 19th century, the City of Brooklyn was especially responsive, building bike lanes in Eastern Parkway, Ocean Parkway, and elsewhere. The "Coney Island Cycle Path" (now Ocean Parkway Bike Path) of 1894 was the first bike path in the United States.

In 1934 Robert Moses became Parks Commissioner and Chairman of the Triborough Bridge, he used these positions to transform the city's infrastructure. However, Moses prioritized private cars over other transportation, and he viewed bicycles as tools for recreation instead of serious transportation. His 1938 plan for cycling declared that "bicycles have no place on public highways." His era of greatest power (from 1934 - 1960) was an era of parkways, and he built cycle tracks within parks and along parkways.

As a result of Moses's philosophy, by the 1960s, New York City's protected bicycle infrastructure was limited to parks and parkways. In the late 60s mayor John Lindsay made some moves to accommodate cycling such as creating limited "car-free" hours on the Central Park roads. In response to the first Earth Day in 1970 he proposed the idea of a bike lane on 5th Avenue. Retail interests along 5th Avenue were skeptical of the plan and blocked the project, fearing it would hurt business.

In 1973 Transportation Alternatives was founded and began its decades-long project of advocating for more bicycle infrastructure. But this would be a long effort because in the 1970s and 80s the only dedicated bicycle infrastructure was limited to city parks.

In June 1980 Mayor Ed Koch created a protected bike lane along 6th Avenue from Washington Square Park to Central Park. But the bike lanes and the mayor came under heavy criticism for this project, with Koch himself complaining to DOT commissioner Sam Schwartz "'I can't go anywhere in this freaking city without somebody complaining about these bike lanes." After 6 months the mayor bowed to pressure and ripped out the bike lanes in November 1980.

By 1987 Koch had completely changed his mind about bicycles and now attempted to ban them entirely from 3 major avenues in Manhattan. A protest movement erupted in response in the summer of 1987, and by March 1988 the city withdrew the Bike Ban.

The next great change happened in the 1990s with the creation of the Hudson River Park. The plan for the new park was announced in 1992 and construction began in 1994 and was complete by 2003. This park runs along the Hudson River and created a continuous park from Riverside Park on 72nd street all the way to the southern tip of Manhattan. The park also includes a jogging/cycling mixed use path called the "Hudson River Greenway." Sections of this path began opening in 1999 and were an important evacuation route during the September 11 attacks in 2001. The greenway has now become the most used bike path in America with around 7000 riders per day.

== Traffic lights ==
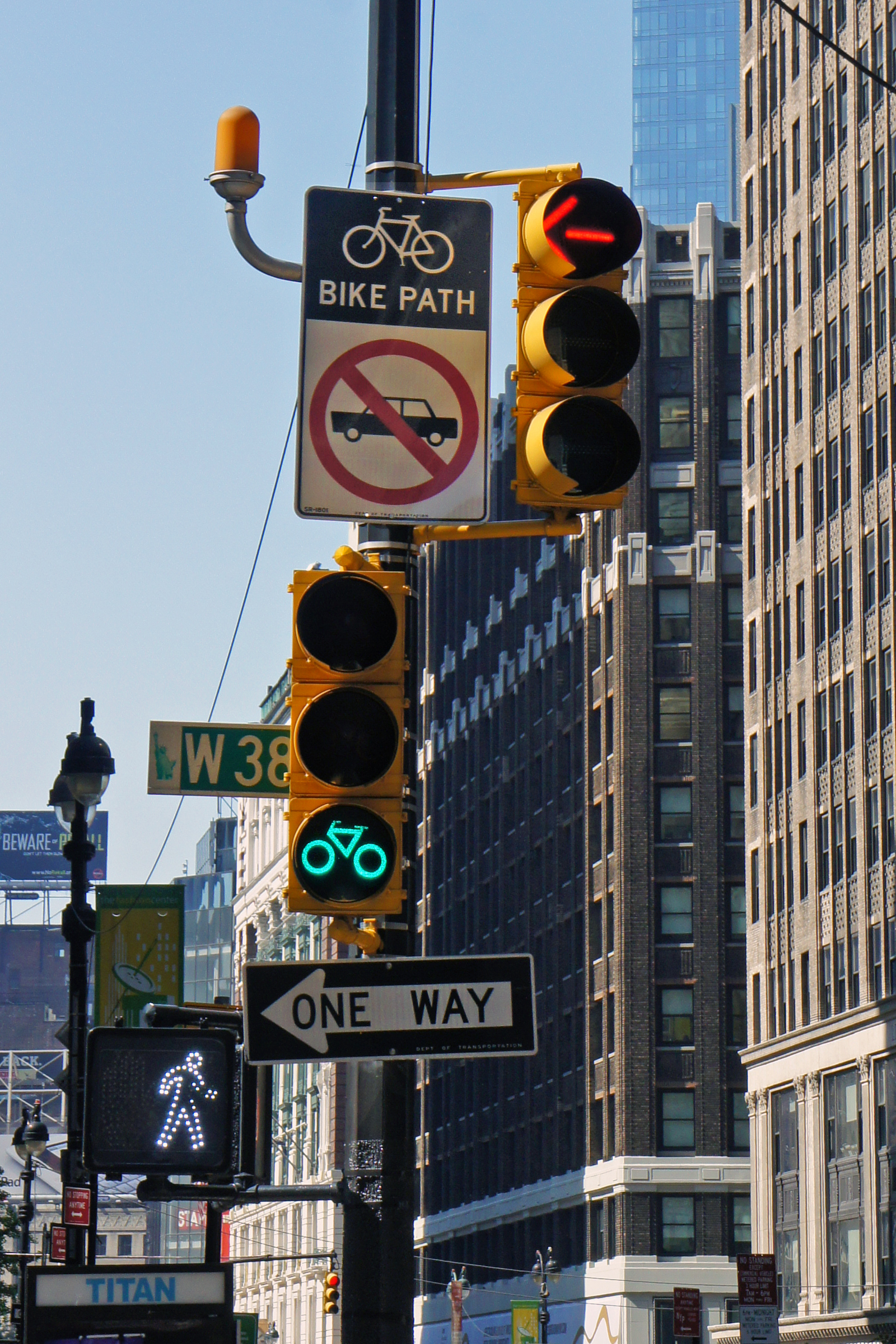
Dedicated bike signal (lower left) and left-turn signal (upper right)

In July 2019, the New York City Council approved legislation that allows bikers to follow pedestrian walk signals at intersections where no dedicated traffic light for cyclists is present. The program applies particularly to intersections with leading pedestrian intervals, intersections where the pedestrian signal displays the walk indication for several seconds before the vehicular traffic light indication changes from red to green.

=== Green waves ===
A "green wave" refers to the programming of traffic lights to allow for continuous traffic flow (a series of green lights) over a number of intersections in one direction. Any vehicle directed by lights, including cars, buses, trucks, and bicycles, will see a change in movement patterns and movement regulation following this programming. Traffic engineers decide on an approximate average speed of each vehicle type, and thus program the traffic lights accordingly, based on which vehicle the city aims to prioritize. In New York City, this "green wave" prioritizes bikers by timing traffic lights around the average biking speed, in addition to mitigating the negative effects of heavy automotive congestion. After a series of bicyclist deaths in 2019, the highest death toll for cyclists in two decades, the city decided to retime traffic lights, so that vehicles would have to travel an average of 15 miles per hour (24 km/h) between consecutive green lights.

The green wave concept was traditionally utilized by traffic engineers to move cars more efficiently and quickly through congested urban streets. It was adapted by cyclists in Copenhagen in 2007 and quickly spread to other locales. This programming marks a shift in prioritizing the biker over the driver, a conflict that has wider class, race, and geographical implications. This implementation of green wave traffic signal programming in New York City has followed smaller instances of success in the U.S., including San Francisco, Portland, and Denver.

Both local government and non-profit transportation constituencies have supported bringing the "green wave" to New York City, America's most congested urban area. Aaron Villere, a senior program associate for the National Association of City Transportation Officials, has cited the findings of cities that have retimed signals for cyclists, stating, "We've seen it improves safety… we've seen it makes the streets more comfortable for people biking, walking, and driving."

However, there is also some criticism, with several critics saying that cyclists often run red lights, and that this behavior is unlikely to change based on new traffic light programming. Spokespeople from Transportation Alternatives, a group that promotes cycling, argued that drivers were likely to object to any proposed change to their long-held claim to the streets.

== Riding ==
=== Laws and rules ===
A bicycle is treated similarly to a motorized vehicle under the law of the State of New York with several exceptions. No license is required to operate a bicycle. Cyclists must ride in the direction of traffic. On one-way streets 40 feet or wider, they may ride on either the left or right side. Children aged 13 years and under must wear a helmet. Adult cyclists must use hand signals, must only wear headphones in one ear, must not ride on sidewalks, and must use lights at night (red in rear and white in front). The NYPD issues moving violations to riders who break the rules.

Rules against fastening bikes to subway property, including fences around street stairs, are enforced more rigorously than those concerning lampposts and other street furniture. Municipal bicycle racks are installed in many neighborhoods. Most are of the traditional design, but the city has added larger protected bicycle parking structures in a handful of locations such as near Union Square. More are planned.

=== Dangers ===
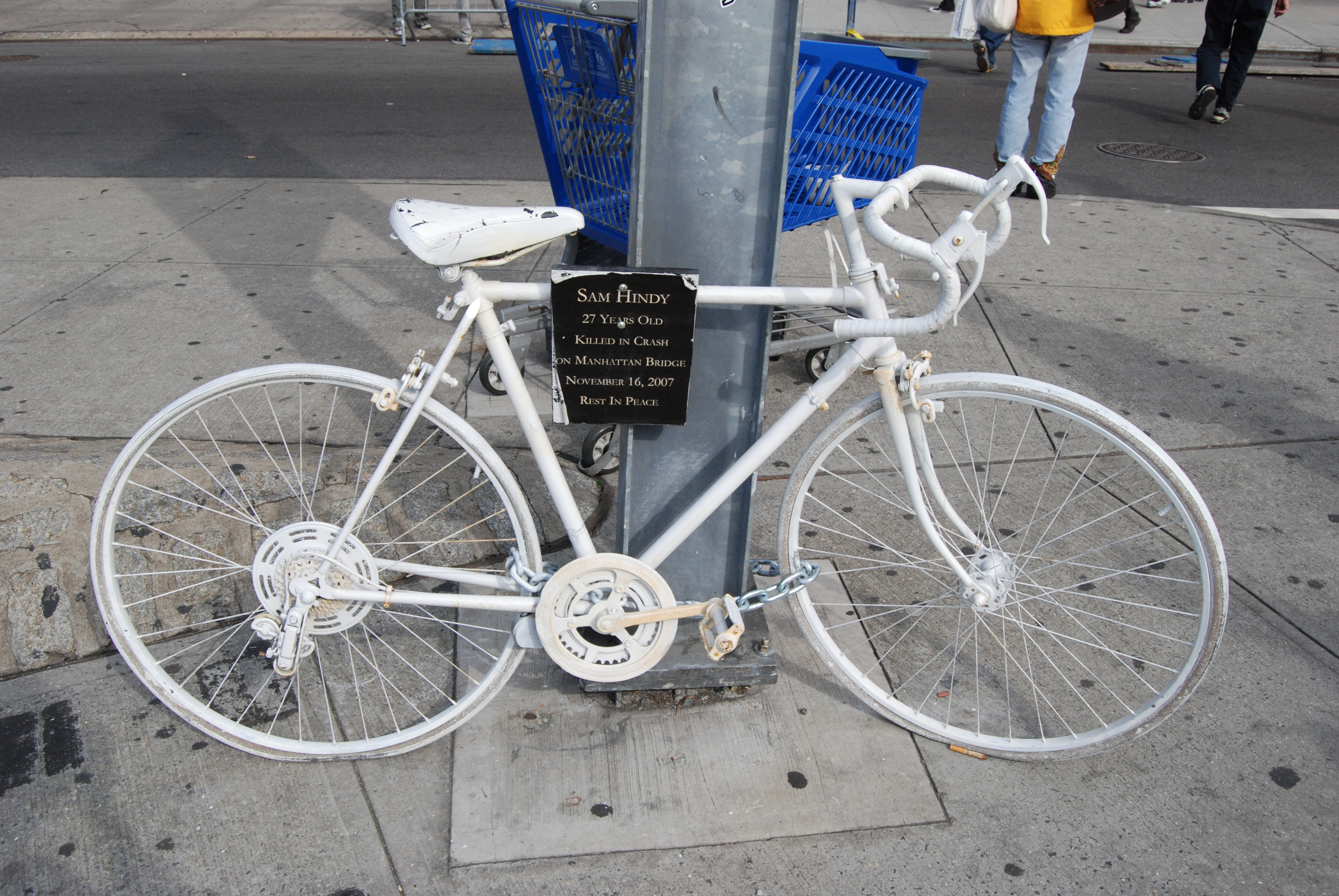
A Ghost bike in Chinatown

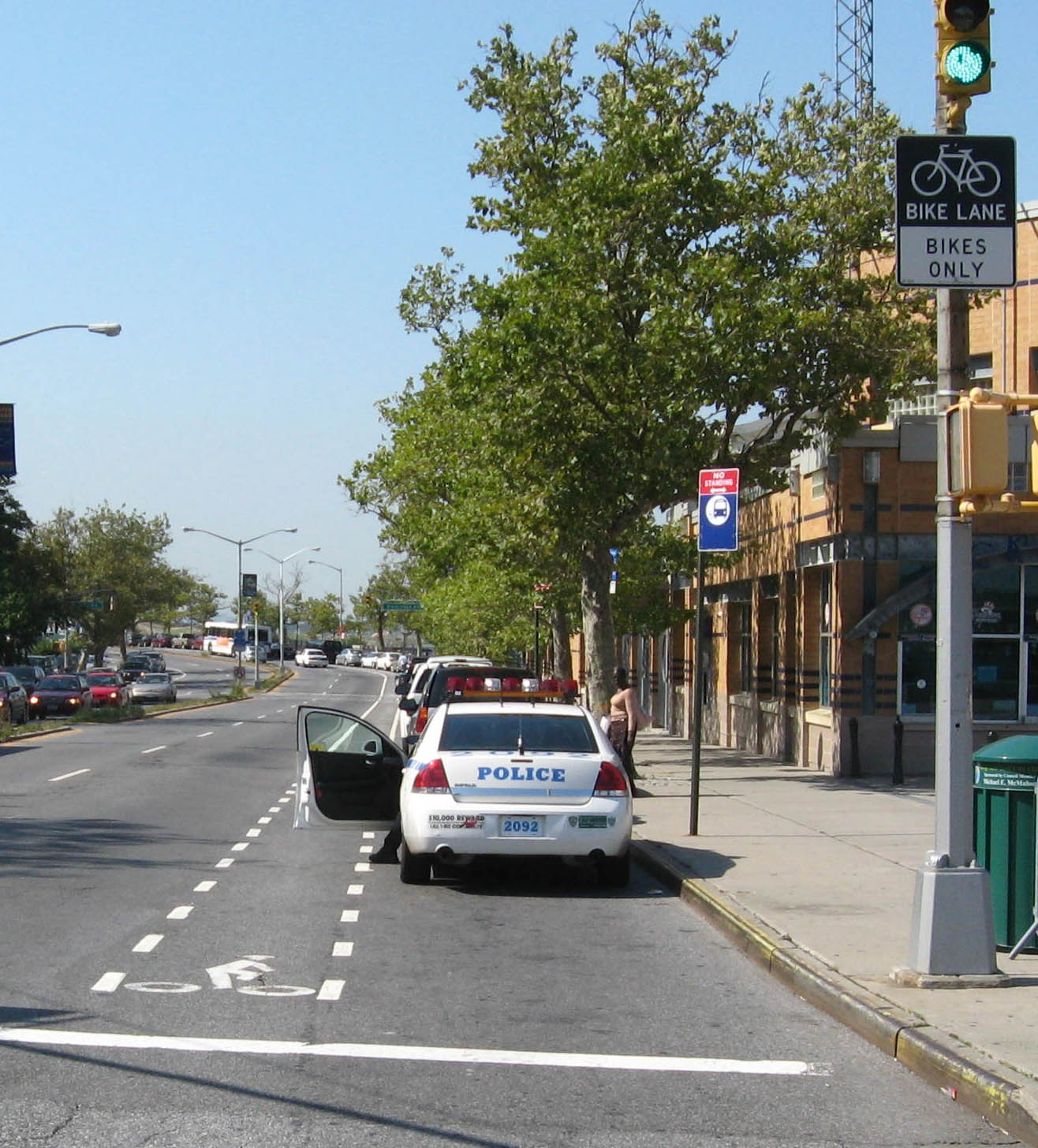
Class II Bike lane in the door zone. This is common in New York City.

When Mayor Bill de Blasio entered office in 2014, he sought to bring all traffic fatalities to zero through his Vision Zero initiative. In 2017, 24 cyclists were killed, and 4,485 were injured in crashes in New York City. A map of fatal crashes and injuries is available on a Vision Zero View website. Some fatality locations are marked by white-painted ghost bikes. Although crash-related injuries to cyclists are not uncommon, their incidence has decreased even as the number of cyclists in New York City has increased. Between 2011 and 2015 there were 12.8 cyclist fatalities per 100 million cycling trips, compared with 44.2 cyclist fatalities per 100 million cycling trips between 1996 and 2000.

Being doored (colliding with the door of a car unexpectedly opened) is a hazard. Many Class II/Class III bike lanes run in the door zone. There has a been an updated list showing different intersections with the most fatalities in NYC.

New York State has established No-Fault auto insurance laws (NYIL §51-52) to pay the medical (and some other) expenses of bicyclists, pedestrians, and other people struck by vehicles. The system is highly complex, however, and no public authority has published instructions on how to access it. Individuals hit by cars should file a crash report with the NYPD or DMV. Cyclists who are hurt in non-vehicle crashes, due to mechanical problem, pothole, etc., should ask the police or EMT to write up an Aided Report; this may be used for insurance claims or to report road hazards to the City so that others are not hurt.

== Public efforts ==
Local group Bike New York encourages cycling and bicycle safety. They host rides throughout the year, including the Five Boro Bike Tour. The group also offers bicycle education programs for all ages through ten "community bike education centers."

Monthly Critical Mass rides in New York have resulted in conflict between the New York City Police Department (NYPD) and bike riders. On August 27, 2004, during the Republican National Convention, more than 400 riders were arrested for 'disrupting traffic'. The arrests, thought to be preemptive action against protests during the convention, spawned lawsuits. Other rides were also followed by arrests, and tickets though in 2008 the NYPD drew back the targeted enforcement effort.

== See also ==
- Bike New York
- Copenhagenization (bicycling)
- Time's Up!
