= The Athlete =

The Athlete may refer to:

- The Athlete (1932 film), a 1932 short animated film, part of the Pooch the Pup series
- The Athlete (2009 film), a 2009 film portraying the life of Ethiopian marathon-runner Abebe Bikila
- The Athlete (Rodin), statue by Auguste Rodin

== See also ==
- Athlete (disambiguation)
- The Athletic, sports website
