= Transportation Alternatives =

Non-profit organization in New York City

- Founded: 1973
- Type: 501(c)(3) nonprofit organization
- Tax ID no.: 51-0186015
- Location: New York City, U.S.
- Members: 2,000+
- Employees: 28
- Volunteers: 12+
- Website: Official website

Transportation Alternatives (TransAlt, formerly T.A.) is a non-profit organization in New York City which works to change New York City's transportation priorities to encourage and increase non-polluting, quiet, city-friendly travel and decrease automobile use. TransAlt seeks a transportation system based on a "Green Transportation Hierarchy" giving preference to modes of travel based on their relative benefits and costs to society. To achieve these goals, T.A. works in five areas: Cycling, Walking and Traffic Calming, Car-Free Parks, Safe Streets and Sustainable Transportation. Promotional activities include large group bicycle rides.

== History ==
Transportation Alternatives was founded in 1973 during the explosion of environmental consciousness that also produced the Clean Air Act, Clean Water Act and the National Environmental Policy Act. Since its founding, TransAlt has helped win numerous improvements for cyclists and pedestrians and has become the leading voice for cycling and walking in New York City and a model for livable streets advocacy across the United States. TransAlt's roots are in cycling in New York City, and many of its members are everyday cyclists. A bicycle friendly city means changing the overall transportation system, which, even in New York City where more people use public transit than cars, means shifting a paradigm dominated by the private automobile. The expression/phrase One Less Car was coined and given to TA by Richard Rosenthal around 1981. Since 2014, TransAlt has been at the forefront of monitoring New York City's Vision Zero initiative and advocating for progress in meeting safety goals.

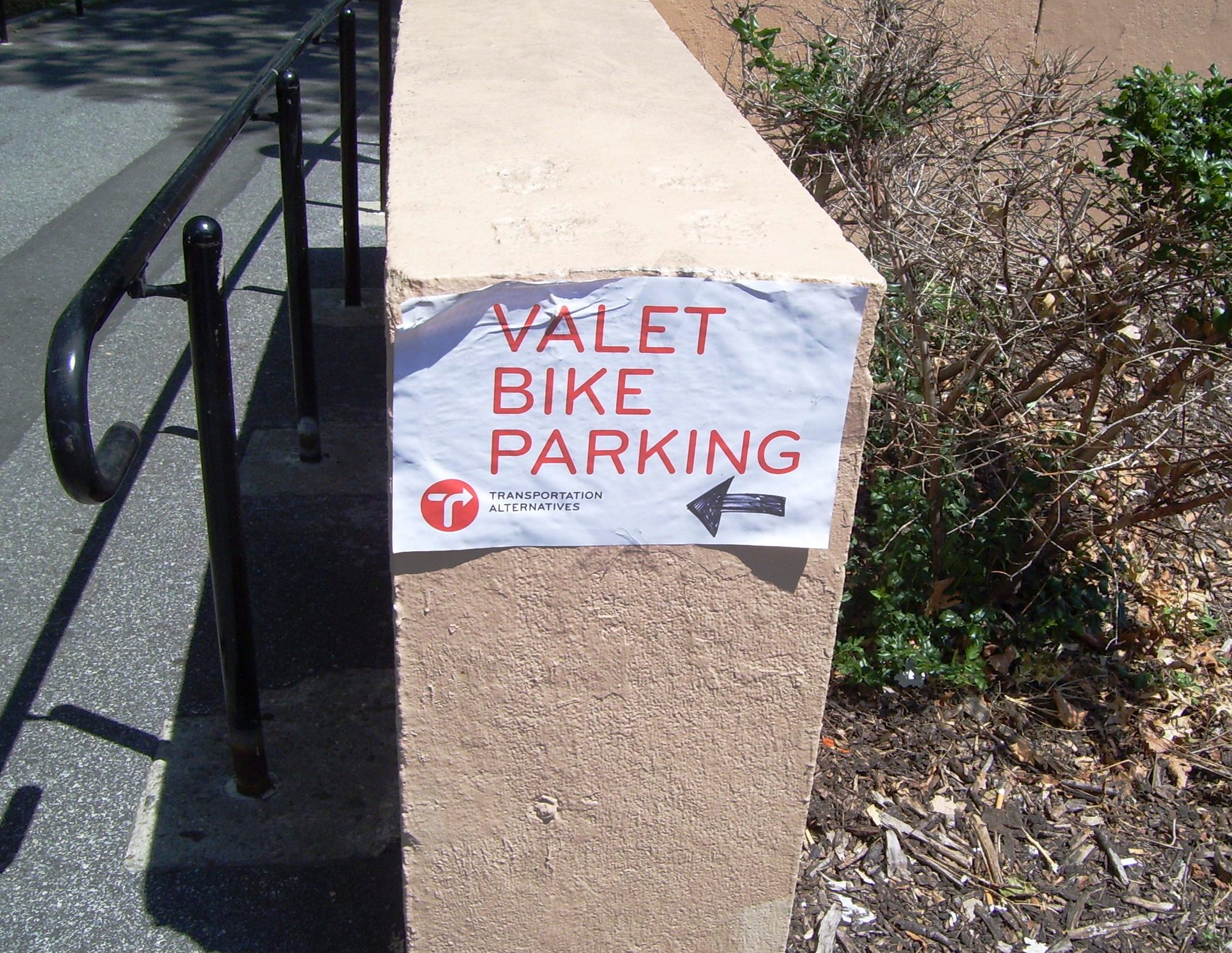
TransAlt provides many different services to the New York City cycling community.

== Past successes ==
Since its creation, Transportation Alternatives has helped achieve goals including:

- A new two-way bike lane on the Brooklyn Bridge
- Pedestrian and bicycling paths on all East River Bridges for the first time in 50 years
- A complete Hudson River Greenway, eleven miles of car-free walking and cycling along the Hudson River
- A promise of a Manhattan Waterfront Greenway, a car-free path circling the entirety of Manhattan
- A permanently car-free Prospect Park.
- A permanently car-free Central Park.
- Publication of a 160-page New York City bicycle master plan, The Bicycle Blueprint
- Legal bike access on New York City Subway and New Jersey Transit, including 24/7 access to the subway
- New Manhattan access to the Brooklyn Bridge promenade and ramped access to the entire path
- Pedestrian safety improvements on Queens Boulevard
- Pedestrian improvements in Herald Square and Times Square
- The Bronx's Safe Routes to School: Pedestrian improvements at 38 Bronx schools
- Creation of NYC DOT citywide Safe Schools Program
- 800 speed bumps on neighborhood streets
- Numerous new bike lanes throughout NYC
- Bicycle racks on city streets throughout NYC
- Legal bicycle access to the George Washington Bridge
- Secure bike parking at several midtown garages
- Pedestrian and cyclist access to River Road on the New Jersey Palisades
- Overturn of a proposed 1987 midtown bicycle ban
- Daylighting intersections to improve visibility and reduce crashes

== Volunteer support ==
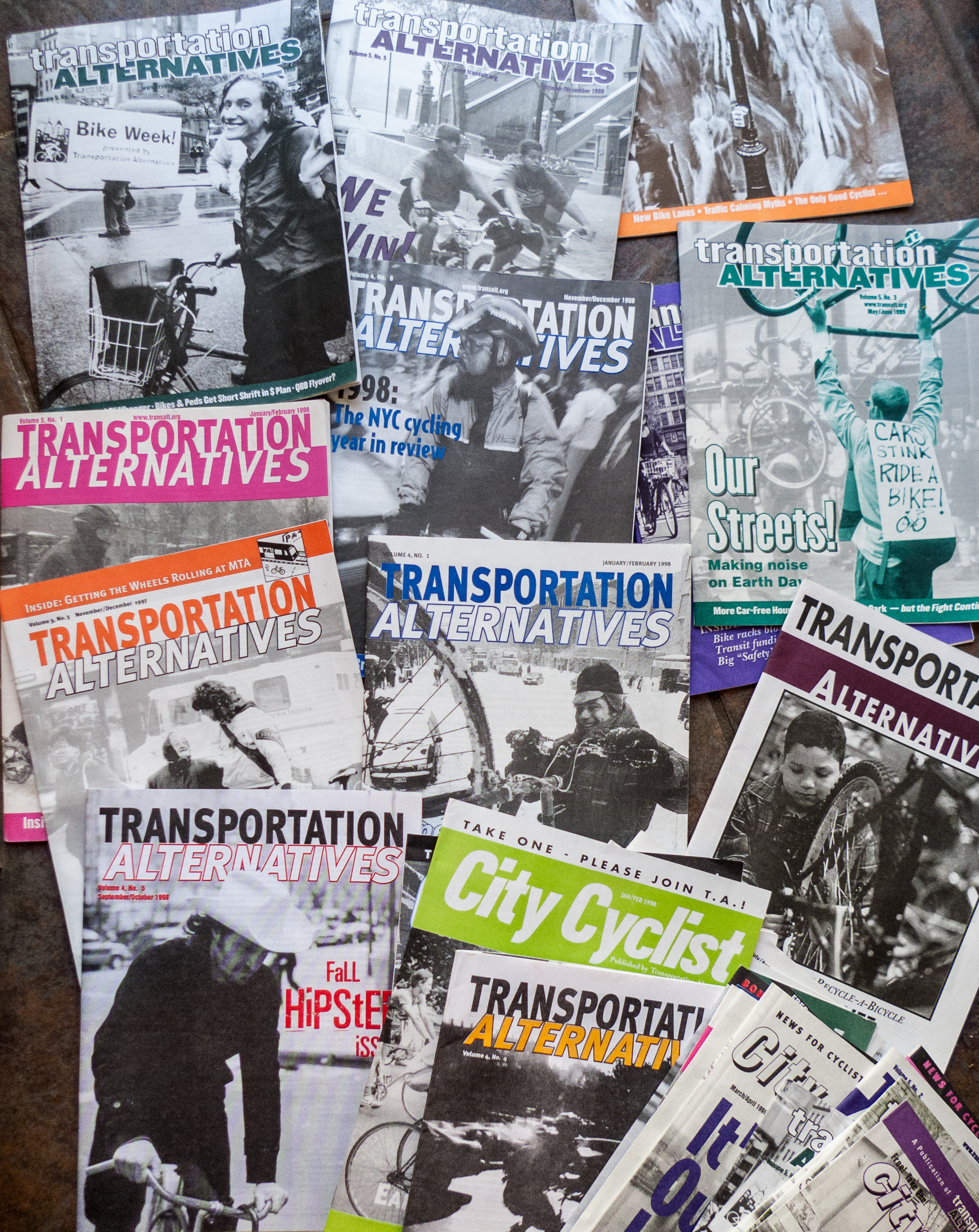
A collection of Transportation Alternatives and City Cyclist magazines which were sent to members, from the late 1990s

Transportation Alternatives relies on thousands of volunteer activists to achieve its goals. While many support TransAlt's bike tours, many more help as part of the organization's eight active borough activist committees, representing The Bronx, Brooklyn, Staten Island, Queens, and Manhattan.

== Events ==
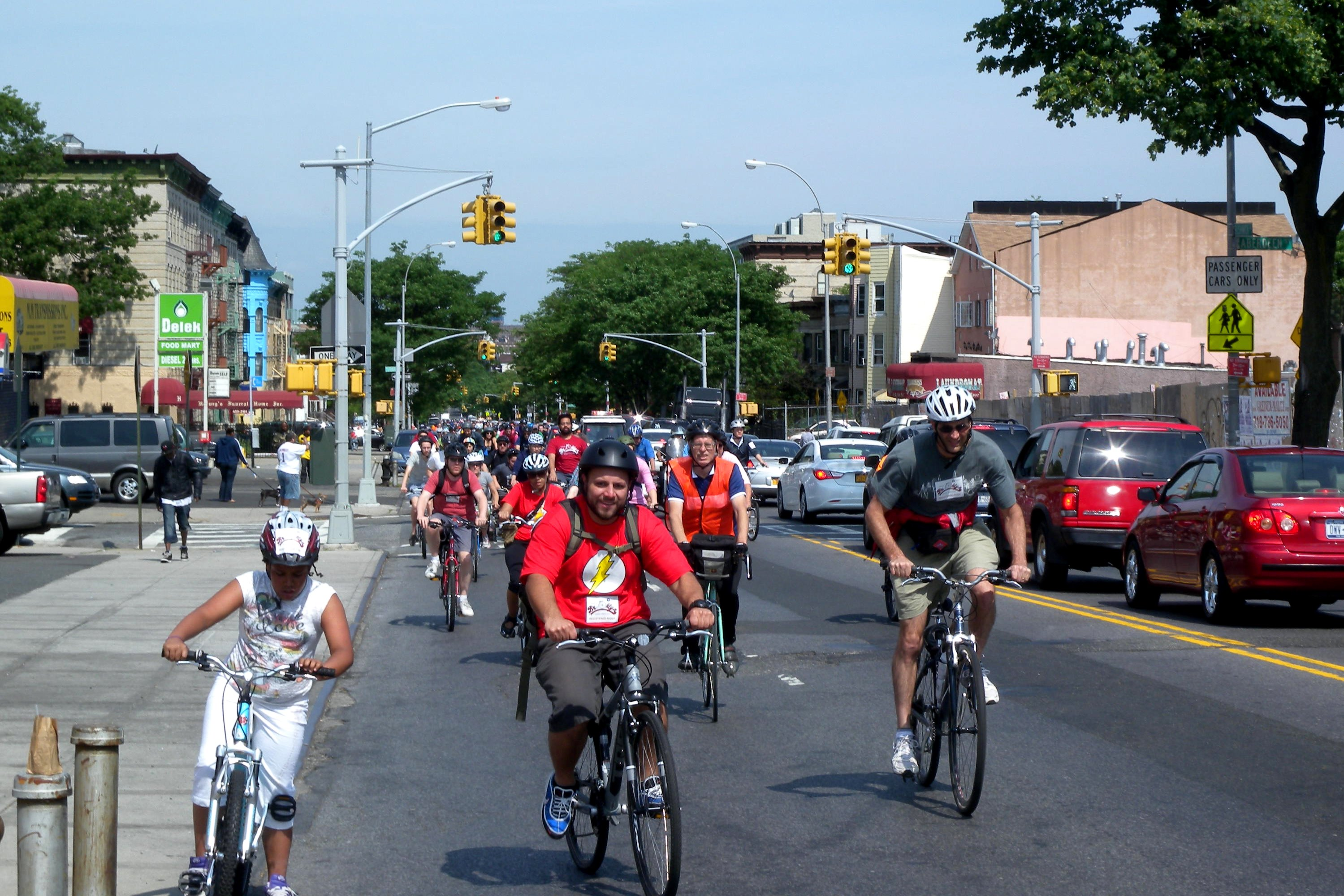
Tour de Brooklyn

Transportation Alternatives has produced a number of bike tours, including the NYC Century Bike Tour (1990-1999, 2025) and the Tour de Staten Island. In addition to fundraising, the purpose of these tours is to introduce New Yorkers to bicycling around the city and to give the confidence and inspiration to take up biking as a regular activity.

TransAlt also puts on a number of other events including the Vision Zero Cities conference, benefits, parties, lectures and other events.

== See also ==
- Cycling in New York City
- Copenhagenization (bicycling)
- New York City speed camera program
