= Athletics =

Athletics may refer to:

== Sports ==
- Sport of athletics, a collection of sporting events that involve competitive running, jumping, throwing, and walking
  - Track and field, a sub-category of the above sport
- Athletics (physical culture), competitions based on human qualities of stamina, fitness, and skill
  - College athletics, non-professional, collegiate- and university-level competitive physical sports and games

== Teams ==
- Athletics (baseball), an American professional baseball team currently based in West Sacramento, California, with no city designation, previously known as:
  - Philadelphia Athletics (1901–1954)
  - Kansas City Athletics (1955–1967)
  - Oakland Athletics (1968–2024)
- Philadelphia Athletics (1860–1876), an American professional baseball team
- Philadelphia Athletics (American Association), an American professional baseball team, 1882–1890
- Philadelphia Athletics (1890–1891), an American professional baseball team
- Philadelphia Athletics (NFL), an American professional football team, 1902–1903

== Other uses ==
- Athletics (band), an American post-rock band

== See also ==
- Athlete (disambiguation)
- Athletic (disambiguation)
