= Dick Traum =

American disability runner (1940–2024)

Richard George Traum (November 18, 1940 – January 23, 2024) was an American disability runner and businessman who was the founder of the Achilles Track Club for disabled athletes. In 1976, he completed the New York City Marathon, becoming the first runner to complete such an event with a prosthetic leg after being the first at shorter distances. He also collaborated with Marathon founder Fred Lebow in drawing more disabled athletes into the marathon. In the 1980s he became the first amputee to finish a 100 km ultra event, in Poland.

In 1993, Traum wrote A Victory for Humanity.

== Recognition ==
In 2010, Traum was inducted into the National Jewish Sports Hall of Fame. The Achilles Track Club was renamed Achilles International in 2004. Dick remained the CEO for 37-years before retiring in 2019. He was inducted to the NYRR Hall of Fame in 2018. As of 2019, he'd run the marathon distance more than seventy times and was the oldest athlete from New York City to run that year's Boston Marathon.

Terry Fox credited reading an article about Traum's marathon running inspired his cross-Canada run for cancer research.

== Personal life ==
Traum died on January 23, 2024, at the age of 83.
