= Achilles International =

Achilles International, formerly known as the Achilles Track Club, was established by Dick Traum in 1983 to encourage people with disabilities to participate in mainstream athletics. Achilles has become an international organization that provides support, training, and technical expertise to people at all levels. They welcome people with all kinds of disabilities, such as: visual impairment, stroke, cerebral palsy, paraplegia, quadriplegia, arthritis, amputation, multiple sclerosis, cystic fibrosis, cancer, traumatic head injury, autism, and many others. With the help of volunteer guides, athletes participate in workouts and races using crutches, wheelchairs, handcycles, prostheses, or without aid at all.

== History ==
Founded in New York City, Achilles has expanded to 40 chapters in the United States and more than 110 chapters on six continents, including countries such as Canada, Norway, New Zealand, Mongolia, Dominican Republic, Russia, South Africa, Vietnam and Japan. Membership is free.

In 1995, Achilles International founded Achilles Kids, which offers weekend athletic programs to children in New York City and in-school programs across to approximately 3,500 children with disabilities (and their non-disabled siblings) across the United States.

Achilles began working with wounded veterans in 2004, an endeavor known as the Achilles Freedom Team of Wounded Veterans. The Freedom Team program provides motivation, training, and the opportunity to rebuild strength and endurance for disabled veterans of the United States Military.

== Activities ==
Achilles is involved in many local and national running events. Every year the track club sponsors a large number of disabled runners for the New York City Marathon. The 2009 New York City Marathon, for example, had over 300 Achilles runners from around the world competing in the 26.2-mile (42.2 km) race. More than 1% of the entire field had membership in the organization, and more than 50 different disabilities were represented by participants.

In addition to running and track events, Achilles has, for several years, entered athletes into the Mayor's Cup Kayak Race staged in NYC. This is a 28-mile (45 km) circumnavigation starting and ending in North Cove Marina.
