= Atlético =

Atlético, Spanish for athletics, or Athletico in English, may refer to:

== Sports ==
=== Athletico ===
- Athletico SC (Lebanon), a Lebanese football academy
- Athletic Bilbao, or Atletico Bilbao, Basque students athletic club (also forming Athletic Club Madrid, which later evolved into Atlético Madrid)
- Athlético Marseille (formerly Groupe Sportif Consolat and sometimes referred to as Marseille Consolat), French amateur football club
- Avendale Athletico, South African football club from Cape Town

=== Atletico / Atlético ===
- Atlético Albacete, Spanish football team based in Albacete, in the autonomous community of Castile-La Mancha
- Atletico Arezzo, or S.S. Arezzo, Italian association football club based in Arezzo, Tuscany
- Atlético Arteixo, Spanish football team based in Arteixo, A Coruña, in the autonomous community of Galicia
- Atlético Astorga FC, Spanish football team based in Astorga in the autonomous community of Castile and León
- Atlético Bahía, Mexican football club in the Liga Premier – Serie A, based in San José del Valle, Bahía de Banderas, Nayarit, Mexico
- Atletico Baja, Mexican indoor soccer franchise playing in the Southwestern Division of the Major Arena Soccer League, representing the Mexican city of Tijuana
- Atlético Belén, Peruvian football club based in the city of Moyobamba, San Martín
- Atlético Bello, earlier Colombian football team, based in the Metropolitan Medellín sector of Bello
- Atlético Boxing Club, Argentine football club located in the city of Río Gallegos, Santa Cruz
- Atlético Bucaramanga, Colombian football team based in Bucaramanga
- Atlético Chalaco, Peruvian football club based in Callao
- Atlético Calatayud, Spanish football team based in Calatayud in the community of Aragon
- Atlético Cali, or Atlético F.C., Colombian football team based in Cali
- Atlético Capitalino Fútbol Club, Mexican football team based in Mexico City
- Atlético Celaya, earlier Mexican football club from Celaya, Guanajuato
- Atlético Chiapas, Mexican football club that played in the Segunda División de México, but is now called Chiapas F.C. Premier Reserves
- Atlético Chiriquí, Panamanian football team playing in Liga Panameña de Fútbol
- Atlético Choloma, Honduran football club that plays its home games at Estadio Rubén Deras in Choloma, Cortés
- Atlético Ceuta, or officially AD Ceuta FC, after a merge between Sociedad Deportiva Ceuta and Atlético Tetuán, under the name of Club Atlético de Ceuta, Spanish football club in Cueta
- Atlético Echagüe, Argentine basketball team located in Paraná, Entre Ríos
- Atlético Ensenada Fútbol Club, earlier Mexican football team based in Ensenada, Baja California
- Atlético Español F.C., earlier Mexican football team which played between 1971 and 1982 in the Primera División de México
- Atlético Frigorífico, earlier Peruvian football club, located in the city of Lima
- Atlético Grau, Peruvian football club, playing in the city of Piura, Peru
- Atlético Huila, Colombian football team based in Neiva
- Atlético Infop, earlier Honduran football club based in Choloma, Hondura
- Atlético Jalisco, Mexican football team based in Guadalajara, Jalisco
- Atlético Juventud Girardot, earlier Colombian football team, based in Girardot, Colombia
- Atlético Junior, or simply as Junior, Colombian football team
- Atletico de Kolkata, now known as ATK, Indian football club in Kolkata, India
- Atlético de Lugones SD, Spanish football club based in Lugones in the autonomous community of Asturias
- Atlético Limeño, Honduran football club that plays its home games at Estadio Milton Flores in La Lima, Cortés
- Atlético Lusitania, earlier Peruvian football club, playing in the city of Barrios Altos, Lima District, Lima
- Atlético Madrid or Club Atlético de Madrid, S.A.D., or simply as Atlético, Atléti, or Atleti, a Spanish professional football club based in Madrid, that play in the Spanish La Liga
- Atlético Madrid B, Spanish football team based in Madrid, in the community of Madrid, founded 1963, the reserve team of Atlético Madrid and currently plays in Segunda División B – Group 1with home games at Cerro del Espino Stadium
- Atlético Madrid C, earlier Spanish football club that played in the Tercera División and played their home games at the Nuevo Cerro del Espino
- Atletico Madrid Balonmano, or BM Neptuno, or merger of Club Balonmano Neptuno/Atlético Madrid, earlier Spanish handball team based in Madrid, Spain (2011 to 2013)
- Atlético Madrid BM, earlier Spanish handball team that was part of the Atlético sports organization (1951 to 1994)
- Atlético Madrid Femenino, Spanish women's football team based in Madrid
- Atlético Madrid Rugby, Spanish rugby union section of the Spanish club Atlético Madrid. Established in 1914
- Atlético Madrid (youth), or Atlético de Madrid Juvenil, the under-19 team of Spanish professional football club Atlético Madrid
- Atlético Malagueño, Spanish football team based in Málaga
- Atlético Minero, Peruvian football club based in Matucana, located in the Department of Lima
- Atlético Malabo, Equatoguinean football club based in Malabo
- Atlético Mancha Real, Spanish football team based in Mancha Real in the autonomous community of Andalusia
- Atlético Monzón, Spanish football team based in Monzón, in the autonomous community of Aragon.
- Atlético Morazán, earlier Honduran football club. It was based in Tegucigalpa, Honduras
- Atlético Morelia, Mexican football club based in Morelia, Michoacán
- Atlético Municipal, Honduran football club based in Santa Cruz de Yojoa
- Atlético Nacional, Colombian professional football team based in Medellín
- Atlético Nacional (Honduras), Honduran football club based in Villanueva, Honduras
- Atletico Nacional (Panama), earlier Panamanian football team founded in 1995 and disbanded in 2001
- Atlético Navalcarnero, Spanish Primera División women's futsal club based in Navalcarnero
- Atlético Olympic FC, Burundian football club located in Bujumbura, Burundi
- Atlético Onubense, Spanish football team based in Huelva, in the autonomous community of Andalusia
- Atlético Orinoco, Venezuelan football club from Ciudad Guayana
- Atlético Ouriense, Portuguese women's football club from Ourém, Portugal
- Atlético Ottawa, Canadian soccer club based in Ottawa, Ontario
- Atlético Pantoja, Domican football team based in Santo Domingo, Dominican Republic
- Atlético Peruano, earlier Peruvian football club, located in the district of Rímac, Lima
- Atlético Petróleos de Luanda, best known as Petro Atlético de Luanda, or simply Petro Atlético or Petro de Luanda, traditional football club from Luanda, Angola
- Atlético Petróleos de Luanda (basketball), Angolan basketball club
- Atletico Piombino, Italian football club located in Piombino, Tuscany
- Atlético Policial, Argentine football club, located in San Fernando del Valle de Catamarca
- Atlético Progresso Clube, commonly known as Progresso, Brazilian football club based in Mucajaí, Roraima state
- Atlético de Rafaela, Argentine sports club from the city of Rafaela
- Atlético Reynosa, Mexican football club based in the city of Reynosa, Tamaulipas
- Atlético Roraima Clube, also known as Atlético Roraima, or just Roraima, Brazilian football team from Boa Vista, Roraima
- Atlético Saguntino, Spanish football team based in Sagunto, in the Valencian Community
- Atlético San Cristóbal, earlier Venezuelan professional football club
- Atlético San Francisco, simply known as Brujos, Mexican professional football club based in San Francisco del Rincón, Guanajuato, México
- Atlético San Luis, Mexican football club based in San Luis Potosí
- Atletico San Paolo Padova, now known as Tombolo Vigontina San Paolo F.C., Italian football team of the city of Tombolo and Vigonza, Veneto
- Atlético Sanluqueño CF, Spanish football team based in Sanlúcar de Barrameda, Province of Cádiz, in the autonomous community of Andalusia
- Atlético Semu, Equatoguinean football club based in the city of Malabo
- Atletico Tanger, Moroccan football club from Tangier in the Moroccan third division
- Atlético Tarazona, Spanish football team based in Tarazona de la Mancha, Albacete in the autonomous community of Castile-La Mancha
- Atlético Tetuán, earlier Spanish football club based in Tétouan, Spanish protectorate of Morocco
- Atlético Torino, Peruvian football club, playing in the city of Talara
- Atlético Tucumán, Argentinian football club based in the city of San Miguel de Tucumán of Tucumán Province
- Atlético Ultramar, East Timorese football club based in Manufahi, Same District, East Timor
- Atlético Uruguay, Argentine football club, located in Concepción del Uruguay, Entre Ríos Province
- Atlético Valdemoro, Spanish football club based in Valdemoro, in the autonomous community of Madrid
- Atletico Vega Real, Dominican football team based in La Vega, Dominican Republic
- Atletico Valladolid later BM Valladolid, Spanish handball team based in Valladolid, Castilla and León
- Atlético Venezuela C.F., Venezuelan football club, founded and promoted to Venezuelan league in 2009 and 2012, based in Caracas playing in Segunda División Venezolana
- Atlético Veracruz, Mexican football club based in Boca del Río, Veracruz
- Atlético Villacarlos, Spanish football club that play in the Regional Preferente de Menorca
- Atlético Zacatepec, earlier Mexican football team based in Zacatepec, Morelos
- Atlético Zulia Fútbol Club, Venezuelan professional club and the club has won one First Division title in the professional era. The club was based in Maracaibo
- AS Atletico Calcio, or Associazione Sportiva Atletico Calcio, earlier Italian football club based in Cagliari and Villasor, Sardinia 1963–2008.
- Alianza Atlético de Sullana, Peruvian football club, located in the city of Sullana, Piura
- Granada Atlético CF, Spanish football team based in Granada, in the autonomous community of Andalusia
- Grêmio Atlético Coariense, commonly known as Grêmio Coariense, Brazilian football club based in Coari, Amazonas state
- Jaboticabal Atlético, commonly known as Jaboticabal, inactive Brazilian football club based in Jaboticabal, São Paulo state
- Lorca Atlético Club de Fútbol, earlier Spanish football team based in Lorca, in the Region of Murcia
- Sevilla Atlético, Spanish football team based in Seville in the autonomous community of Andalusia

=== Atlético Clube ===
- Atlético Clíper Clube, commonly known as Clíper, Brazilian football club based in Manaus, Amazonas
- Atlético Clube Coríntians, or Coríntians, Brazilian soccer club based in the city Caicó in the state of Rio Grande do Norte,
- Atlético Clube Goianiense, usually known as Atlético Goianiense or just as Atlético, Brazilian football team from the city of Goiânia, Goiás state
- Atlético Clube Juventus, commonly known as Juventus do Acre, Brazilian football club based in Rio Branco, Acre
- Atlético Clube Lagartense, commonly known as Lagartense, Brazilian football club based in Lagarto, Sergipe state
- Atlético Clube de Portugal, Portuguese sports club based in the parish of Alcântara, in the west side of Lisbon.

=== Atlético Deportivo ===
- Atlético Deportivo Olímpico, Peruvian football club, playing in the city of Callao, Lima, Peru

=== Atlético Sport ===
- Atlético Sport Aviação, best known as ASA, Angolan football club from Luanda, Angola

=== Atléticos ===
- Atléticos de Levittown FC, Puerto Rican football club which played in the now defunct Campeonato Nacional de Fútbol de Puerto Rico
- Atléticos de San Germán, Puerto Rican basketball club of the Baloncesto Superior Nacional (BSN) based in San Germán, Puerto Rico

=== CD Atlético ===
- CD Atlético Baleares, Spanish football team based in Palma, Majorca
- CD Cristo Atlético is a Spanish football team based in Palencia, in the autonomous community of Castile and León
- CD Motril Atlético, Spanish football team based in Motril, Granada

=== Club Atletico / Club Atlético / CA ===
- Club Atlético Aguada, commonly known as simply Aguada, Uruguayan basketball team based in Montevideo
- Club Atlético Aldosivi, usually simply Aldosivi, Argentine sports club based in the city of Mar del Plata, Buenos Aires Province
- Club Atlético Alto Perú, Uruguayan football club from Montevideo
- Club Atlético Alvear, or Club Alvear, earlier Argentine football club affiliated to Argentine Football Association during the 1920s and 1930s
- CA Antoniano, or Club Atlético Antonianio, Spanish football team based in Lebrija, Province of Seville, in the autonomous community of Andalusia
- Club Atlético Argentino de Junín, known simply as Argentino de Junín, Argentine basketball club based in Junín, Buenos Aires Province
- Club Atletico Argentino de Quilmes, or Argentino de Quilmes, Argentine football club from Quilmes, Buenos Aires
- Club Atlético Atlanta, Argentine sports club from the Villa Crespo district of Buenos Aires. Nicknamed Los Bohemios ("The Bohemians"), Atlanta
- Club Atlético Banco de la Nación Argentina, also known as Club Banco Nación, Argentine sports club, located in the neighborhood of Vicente López, in the homonymous partido of Greater Buenos Aires
- Club Atlético Banfield, Argentine sports club based in the Banfield district of Greater Buenos Aires
- Club Atlético Belgrano, mostly known simply as Belgrano or Belgrano de Córdoba, Argentine sports club from the city of Córdoba
- Club Atlético Bella Vista, usually known simply as Bella Vista, Uruguayan football club based in Montevideo
- Club Barcelona Atlético, Dominican Republic football club
- Club Atlético Basáñez, or just Basáñez, Uruguayan football and boxing club in Montevideo, Uruguay
- Club Atlético Chacarita Juniors, usually known simply as Chacarita, Argentine football club headquartered in Villa Crespo, Buenos Aires
- Club Atlético Claypole, Argentine football club located in Claypole, Buenos Aires
- Club Atlético Colegiales (Argentina), usually just Atlético Colegiales or simply Colegiales, Argentine football club from Florida Oeste, Buenos Aires
- Club Atlético Colegiales (Paraguay), usually just Atlético Colegiales or simply Colegiales, Paraguayan football club from 4 Mojones, Paraguay
- Club Atlético Colón, commonly referred to as Colón de Santa Fe, Argentine sports club from Santa Fe, Argentina
- Club Atlético Corrales, usually Atlético Corrales, earlier Paraguayan football club based in Asunción, Paraguay
- Club Atletico Defensores Unidos, or presently Defensores Unidos, Argentine football club from the Villa Fox district of Zárate, Buenos Aires
- Club Atlético Douglas Haig, Argentine football club from Pergamino, Buenos Aires Province
- Club Atlético Fénix, Argentine football club from Pilar, Buenos Aires Province
- Club Atlético Goes, Uruguayan basketball team located in Montevideo
- Club Atlético Huracán, Argentine sports club from the Parque Patricios neighbourhood of Buenos Aires
- Club Atlético Independiente, Argentine sports club, which has its headquarters and stadium in the city of Avellaneda in Greater Buenos Aires
- Club Atletico Juventud de Las Piedras, Uruguayan sports club from Las Piedras, Canelones, Uruguay
- Club Atlético Lanús, Argentine sports club from the Lanús district of Greater Buenos Aires
- Club Atlético Nueva Chicago, Argentine football club in the Primera B Nacional
- Club Atlético Ñuñorco, Argentine football club located in Monteros of Tucumán Province
- Club Atlético Olimpia or simply Olimpia, Uruguayan sports club founded 1918, from the Columbus neighborhood in the north of the Uruguayan capital city of Montevideo
- Club Athletico Paranaense, Brazilian football team from Curitiba in Paraná
- Club Atlético Palmaflor, best known as Atlético Palmaflor and named Municipal Vinto until 2019, Bolivian football club based in Quillacollo.
- Club Atlético Patronato de la Juventud Católica, commonly called Patronato or Patronato de Paraná, Argentine football club based in Paraná
- Club Atlético Peñarol, also known as Carboneros, Aurinegros and (familiarly) Manyas — Uruguayan sports club from Montevideo
- Club Atlético de Pinto, or CA Pinto, Spanish football team based in Pinto, in the autonomous community of Madrid
- Club Atlético Porteño, Argentine rugby union club sited in San Vicente, Buenos Aires
- Club Atlético Provincial, also known as Provincial de Rosario, Argentine sports club located in the city of Rosario, Santa Fe
- Club Atlético River Plate, commonly known as River Plate, Argentine professional sports club based in the Núñez neighborhood of Buenos Aires
- Club Atlético River Plate (Montevideo), Uruguayan football club based in Montevideo
- Club Atlético San Lorenzo, commonly known as San Lorenzo de Almagro or simply San Lorenzo, Argentine sports club
- Atlético Club San Martín de Mendoza, popularly known as San Martín de Mendoza, Argentine football club from the city of San Martín in Mendoza Province, Argentina
- Club Atlético San Miguel, Argentine sports club from San Miguel, Buenos Aires
- Club Atlético San Telmo, Argentine sports club located in the neighbourhood of San Telmo, in the City of Buenos Aires
- Club Atlético Vélez Sarsfield, Argentine sports club based in Liniers, Buenos Aires

=== Clube Atlético / Atlético Clube ===
- Clube Atlético Aliança, commonly known as Aliança, Brazilian football club based in Santana, Amapá state
- Clube Atlético da Barra da Tijuca, commonly known as Barra da Tijuca, Brazilian football club based in Rio de Janeiro, Rio de Janeiro state
- Clube Atlético Carazinho, commonly known as Atlético Carazinho, Brazilian football club based in Carazinho, Rio Grande do Sul state
- Club Atletico Chaco For Ever, or just Chaco For Ever, Argentine Football club, their home town is Resistencia, in the Province of Chaco
- Clube Atlético Hermann Aichinger, or Atlético Ibirama, inactive Brazilian football team from Ibirama in Santa Catarina
- Clube Atlético Itapemirim, commonly known as Atlético Itapemirim, Brazilian football club based in Itapemirim, Espírito Santo state
- Clube Atlético Mineiro and colloquially as Galo, Brazilian football club based in Belo Horizonte, Minas Gerais
- Clube Atlético Monte Líbano (basketball), abbreviated as C.A. Monte Líbano and CAML, Brazilian men's basketball club that is based in São Paulo
- Clube Atlético Portal, commonly known as CAP Uberlândia, Brazilian football club based in Uberlândia, Minas Gerais state
- Clube Atlético Sorocaba, usually known as Atlético Sorocaba, inactive Brazilian football club from Sorocaba
- Clube Atlético Taguatinga, commonly known as Atlético Taguatinga, or even Taguatinga, earlier Brazilian football club based in Núcleo Bandeirante, in Distrito Federal, Brazil
- Club Atlético Tigre, popularly known as The Killer or simply Tigre, Argentine sports entity located in Victoria, Buenos Aires, Argentina
- Clube Atlético Tricordiano, or simply Tricordiano, Brazilian currently inactive football team from Três Corações, Minas Gerais
- Clube Atlético Tubarão, Brazilian football team from Tubarão, Santa Catarina
- Club Atletico Victoriano Arenas, or Victoriano Arenas, Argentine sports club located in the Avellaneda district of Greater Buenos Aires
- Alagoinhas Atlético Clube, or Atlético de Alagoinhas, Brazilian football club based in Alagoinhas, Bahia
- Apucarana Atlético Clube, usually known simply as Apucarana, Brazilian football team from the city of Apucarana, Paraná state
- Bauru Atlético Clube, commonly known as Bauru, earlier Brazilian football club based in Bauru, São Paulo state
- Casa Pia Atlético Clube, Portuguese football team in LigaPro founded in 1920 and based in Lisbon, Portugal
- Concórdia Atlético Clube, usually known simply as Concórdia, Brazilian football club from Concórdia, Santa Catarina
- Coxim Atlético Clube, commonly known as Coxim, Brazilian football team based in Coxim, Mato Grosso do Sul state
- Cristal Atlético Clube, also known as Cristal, Brazilian football team from Macapá, Amapá
- Jacareí Atlético Clube, commonly known as Jacareí, is a currently inactive Brazilian football club based in Jacareí, São Paulo state
- Nacional Atlético Clube (MG), commonly known as Nacional de Muriaé, Brazilian football club based in Muriaé, Minas Gerais state
- Olaria Atlético Clube, usually abbreviated to Olaria, Brazilian football team based in the city of Rio de Janeiro
- Paissandu Atlético Clube, commonly known as Paissandu, Brazilian sports club from the Brazilian metropolis of Rio de Janeiro
- Quilmes Atlético Club, Argentine sports club based in the Quilmes district of Greater Buenos Aires
- Três Passos Atlético Clube, commonly known as Três Passos, Brazilian football club based in Três Passos, Rio Grande do Sul state
- União Suzano Atlético Clube, or simply União Suzano, Brazilian football team based in Suzano, São Paulo
- Yale Atlético Clube, usually called Yale, one of the first sports club in Belo Horizonte, Minas Gerais, Brazil

=== Club Deportivo Atlético / CD / SD ===
- A.S.D. Atletico Elmas, Italian association football club located in Elmas, Sardinia. It currently plays in Promozione Sardinia
- C.D. Atlético Nacional, Salvadoran football club based in San Luis Talpa, El Salvador
- C.S.D. Independiente del Valle, known simply as Independiente del Valle or Independiente, Ecuadorian football club based in Sangolquí, Ecuador
- S.D. Atlético Nacional, Panamanian football team based in Panama City

=== CF Atletico / FC Atletico ===
- AFC Atletico Vaslui, earlier Romanian football club based in Vaslui, Vaslui County
- CF Atlético Ciudad, earlier Spanish football club based in Murcia, in the autonomous community of Murcia.
- FC Atlético Cearense, Brazilian football club based in Fortaleza, Ceará state
- FC Barcelona B, Spanish football club, formerly known as FC Barcelona Atlétic
- FCF Atlético Jiennense, Spanish football club from Jaén

=== Union Deportiva Atletico / UD Atletico ===
- U.S.D. Atletico Catania, Unione Sportiva Dilettantistica Atletico Catania, Italian association football club founded in 1967 and based in Catania, Sicily
- UD Las Palmas Atlético, or Unión Deportiva Las Palmas Atlético is the reserve team of UD Las Palmas, club based in Las Palmas, in the autonomous community of the Canary Islands

=== Various ===
- Centro Atlético S.C. (usually called Centro Atlético), earlier Venezuelan professional football club
- Instituto Atlético Central Córdoba, commonly referred as Instituto or Instituto de Córdoba, Argentine sports club from the city Córdoba
- Ottawa South United or OSU Atlético, a club of Atlético Madrid
- Paris 13 Atletico, French football club based in the 13th arrondissement of Paris, previously known as FC Gobelins
- Sociedade Atlético Ceilandense, commonly known as Atlético Ceilandense, Brazilian football club based in Ceilândia, Distrito Federal

== See also ==
- "Atletico" (song), full title "Atletico (The Only One)", a song by Rae Morris
- Atletico Partick, Scottish TV sitcom that aired on BBC from 1995 to 1996
