= Athletic club =

Athletic club may refer to:

- Club (organization), that provides sports facilities to members
- Sports club, a single- or multi-sport organization, amateur or professional, whose members compete in athletic and sporting activities
- Athletic Bilbao, officially known as Athletic Club, a Spanish association football club from Bilbao, Spain
  - Athletic Bilbao B, the reserve football section
  - Athletic Bilbao (women), the women's football section
  - Athletic Club (women) B, the reserve women's football section
- Athletic Club (MG), a Brazilian association football club from São João del-Rei, Minas Gerais
- Athletic Club of Columbus, a historic building in Columbus, Ohio, US
