= Athlete (2019 film) =

2019 film directed by Takamasa Oe

- Japanese theatrical release poster
- Directed by: Takamasa Oe
- Written by: Yasutoshi Murakawa
- Produced by: Tomoko Yoshioka
- Starring: Joe Nakamura; Yohdi Kondo; Yoshiaki Umegaki; Reina Tasaki; Fumihiko Nakamura; Rai Minamoto
- Cinematography: Daisuke Miura
- Music by: Yasuhira Shigemori
- Release dates: July 15, 2019 (Rainbow Reel Tokyo); July 26, 2019 (Japan)
- Running time: 89 minutes
- Country: Japan
- Language: Japanese

Athlete (アスリート 〜俺が彼に溺れた日々〜, Asurīto: Ore ga Kare ni Oboreta Hibi) lit. 'Athlete ~The days I drowned by him~' is a 2019 Japanese drama film directed by Takamasa Oe. It made its world premiere in the 28th Rainbow Reel Tokyo festival on July 15, 2019. The film stars Joe Nakamura and Yohdi Kondo.

== Cast ==
- Joe Nakamura as Kohei Kaido
- Yohdi Kondo as Yutaka "Yuta" Imaizumi
- Yoshiaki Umegaki as Priscilla
- Reina Tasaki as Mizuna Kaido
- Fumihiko Nakamura as Atsushi
- Rai Minamoto as Mimosa
- Flora Miwa as Rinka

== Release ==
The film was played at festivals including the 2019 Rainbow Reel Tokyo and Taoyuan Film Festivals and had a small general release in Japan, beginning on July 26 at UPLINK Kichijoji in Kichijoji, Tokyo and expanding on August 3 to cinemas in Osaka, Nagoya and Himeji.

In June 2020, it became available internationally with subtitles in English, Chinese, Thai and Indonesian for subscribers to the Taiwan-based streaming service provider Gagaoolala.

== Reception ==
The film received mixed reviews from 18 critics of Yahoo! Japan, which gave the film an average of 3.56 stars. Asian Movie Pulse highlighted the taboo of LGBT rights in Japan and highlighted the film in those aspects, though said that "while you can enjoy a movie that opens many colours of the rainbow and waves more than one flag, your enthusiasm might hit several walls" adding that "Unfortunately, the relationship and its hardships are the least interesting line in the narrative" and concluded that the film is "perplexing."
