= Five Boro Bike Tour =

Bicycle road ride event in New York City

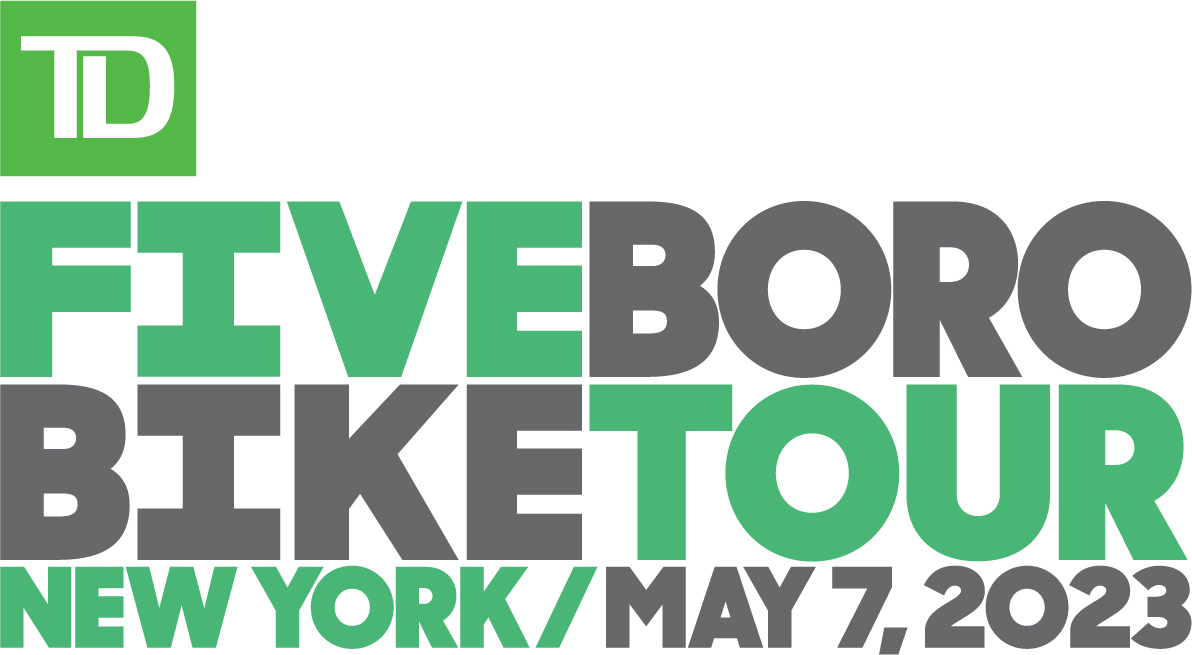
- 2023 TD Five Boro Bike Tour
- Date: First Sunday in May
- Location: New York City
- Event type: Bicycle road ride
- Distance: 40-mile (64 km)
- Primary sponsor: TD Bank
- Beneficiary: Bike New York
- Established: 1977
- Website: Official website
- Participants: 32,000

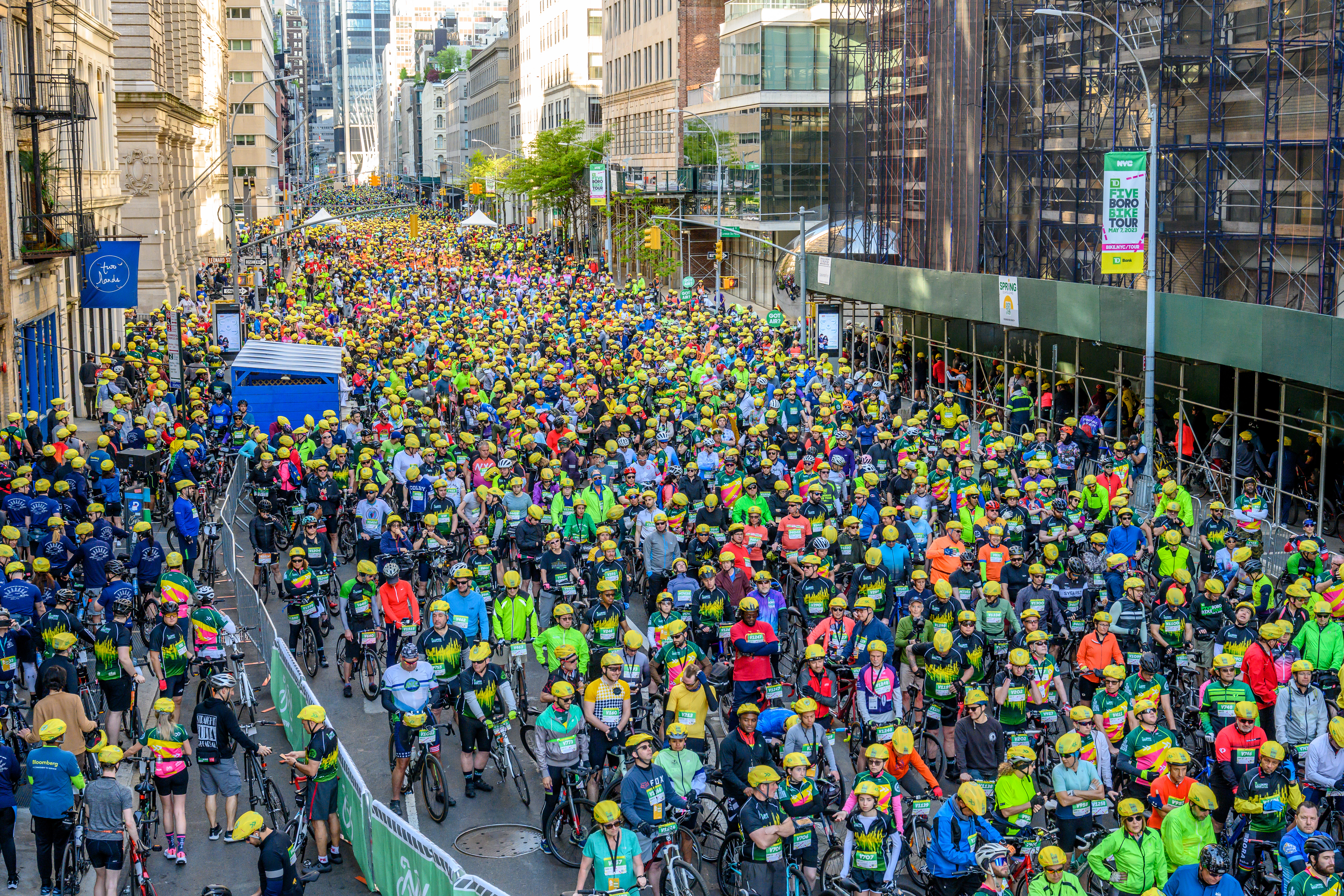
Riders at the starting point

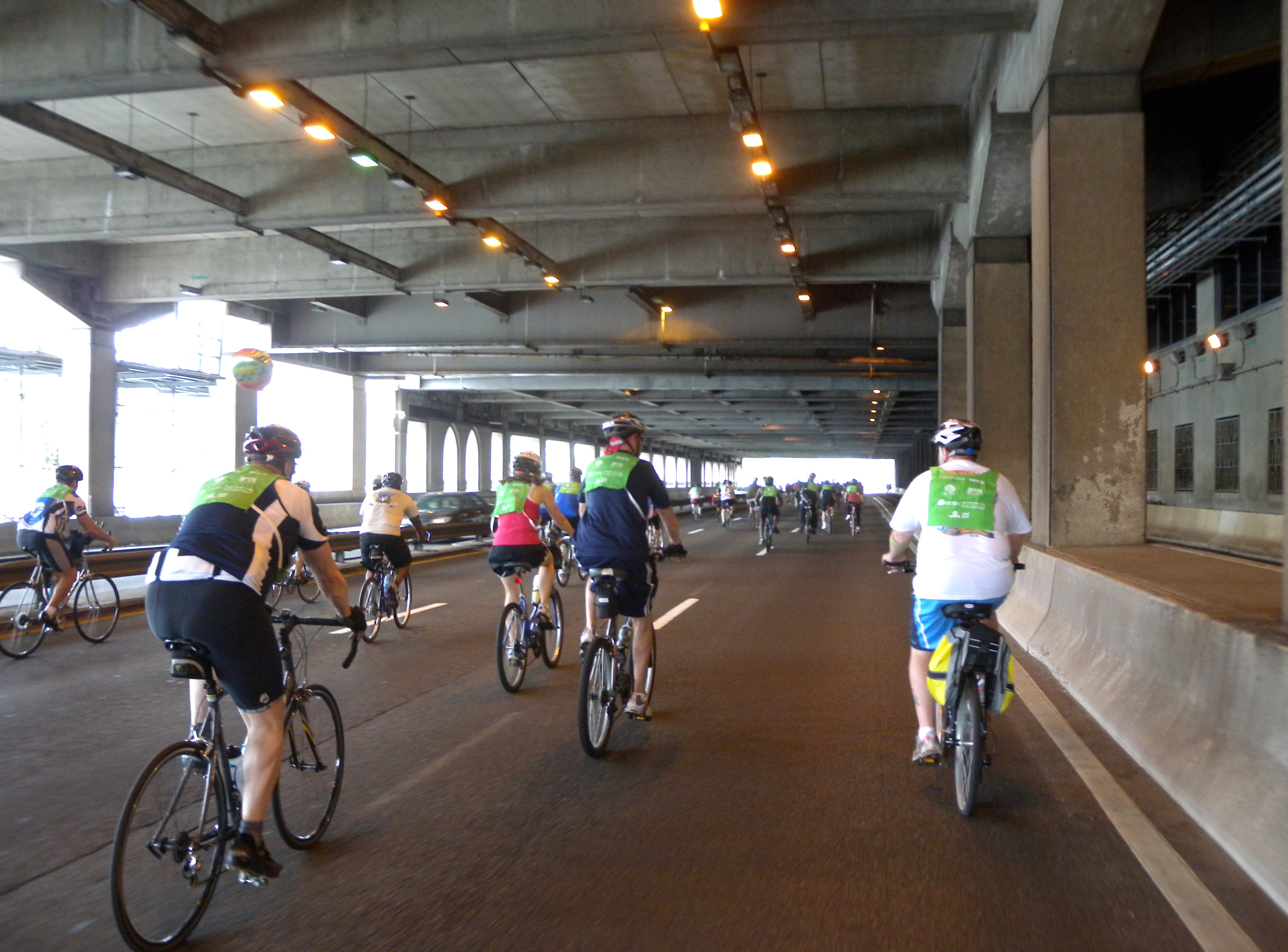
On FDR Drive

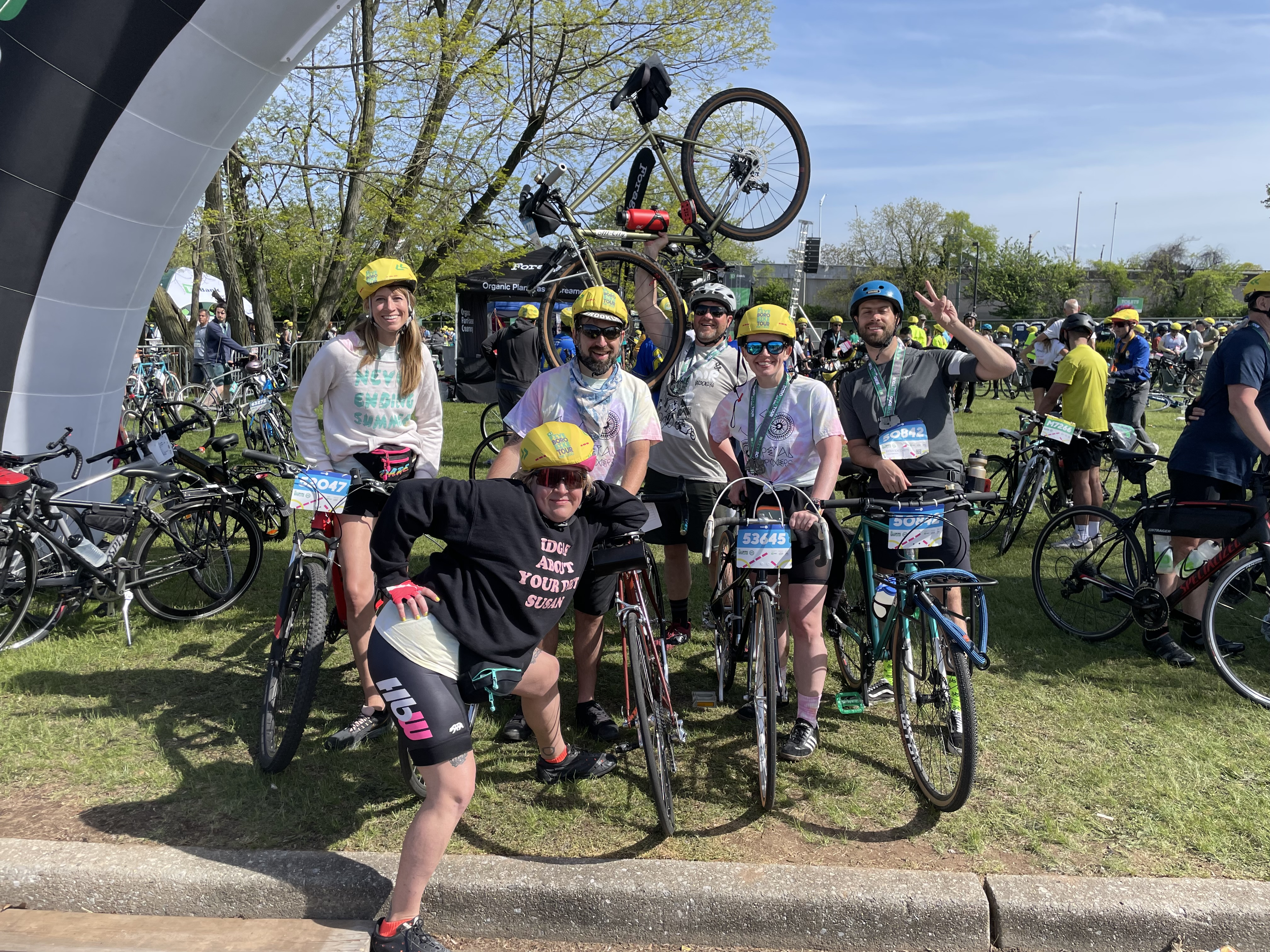
On Staten Island

The TD Five Boro Bike Tour is an annual recreational cycling event in New York City organized by Bike New York. It is a charity event to fund Bike New York's education programs. Conducted on the first Sunday of May, the 40-mile (64 km) ride has over 32,000 riders. The route takes riders through all five of New York's boroughs and across five major bridges. The entire route, including bridges and expressways which normally prohibit cyclists, is closed to automobile traffic for the ride.

== History ==
2014 Logo

The event began on June 12, 1977, as the Five Boro Challenge with about 250 participants on an 80-mile (130 km) course. The goal of the first tour was to provide training in bicycle safety for high school students.

Then New York City Mayor Ed Koch promoted the idea of a citywide bike tour and the distance was shortened. From 1979 to 1990, Citibank was the primary sponsor of the event. Citibank withdrew as sponsor in 1991. Unable to find a replacement sponsor in time, the event was not held that year. It returned in 1992 when TD Bank bought naming rights to the tour. In 2013, the city proposed to charge the tour nearly a million dollars for police services, claiming Bike New York does not qualify as a charity; after Bike New York filed a lawsuit, Judge Margaret Chan ruled that the New York City Police Department does not have the right to make that determination.

The Tour had originally been managed by the New York Council of American Youth Hostels (AYH). In 1999, AYH spun off the event into a new nonprofit called Bike New York.

The 2020 tour was cancelled due to the COVID-19 pandemic but has since continued annually.

== Route ==
The route begins in Lower Manhattan, heads north via Sixth Avenue through the interior of Central Park and continues into Harlem and the Bronx via the Madison Avenue Bridge. Re-entering Manhattan, it travels south along the East River on the FDR Drive. The route crosses the Queensboro Bridge into Queens before heading south across the Pulaski Bridge into Brooklyn, and over the Brooklyn-Queens Expressway via the Verrazzano–Narrows Bridge into Staten Island.
