= Speed limit enforcement =

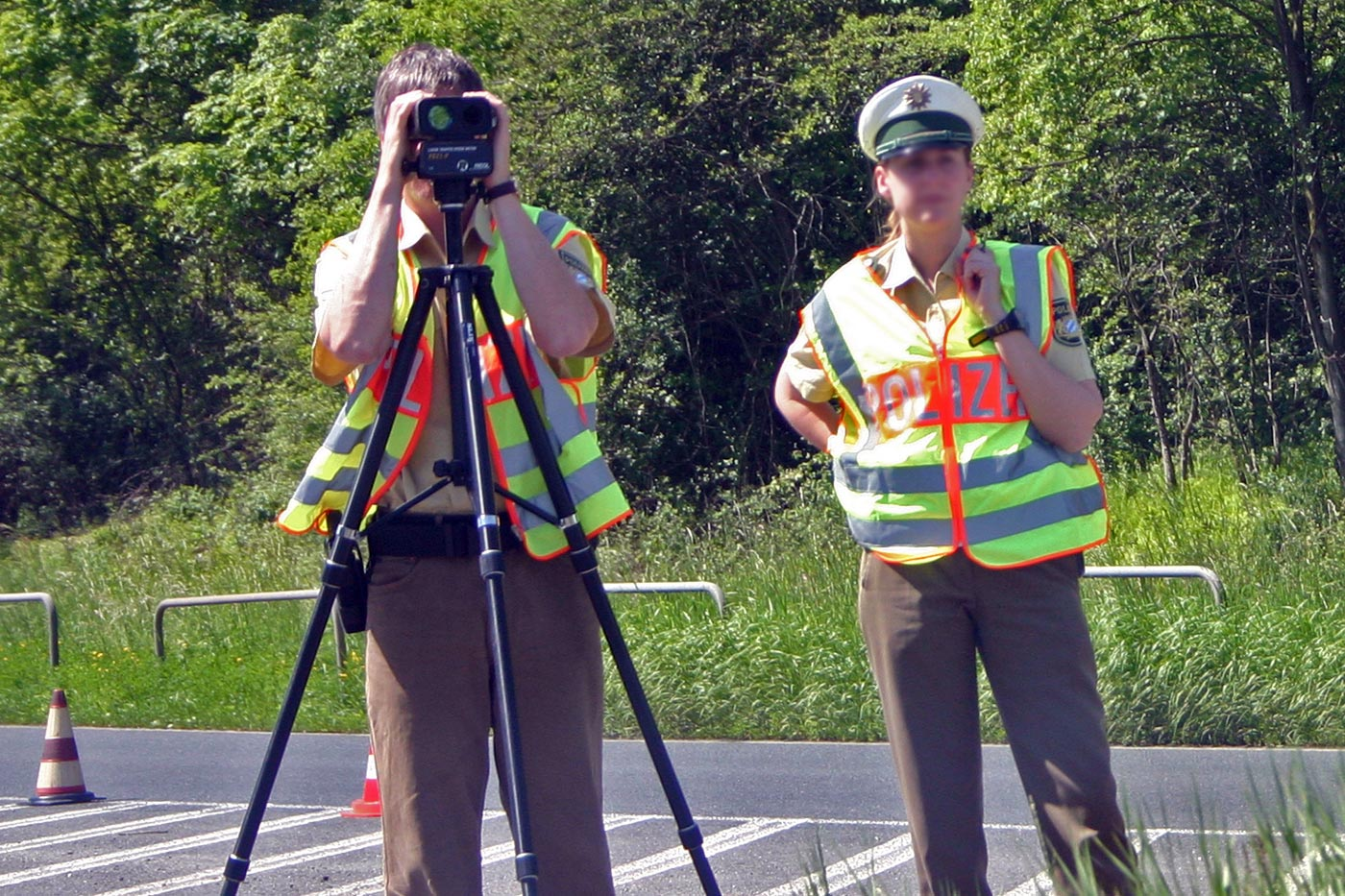
Police officers in Bavaria checking speed with a tripod-mounted LIDAR speed gun

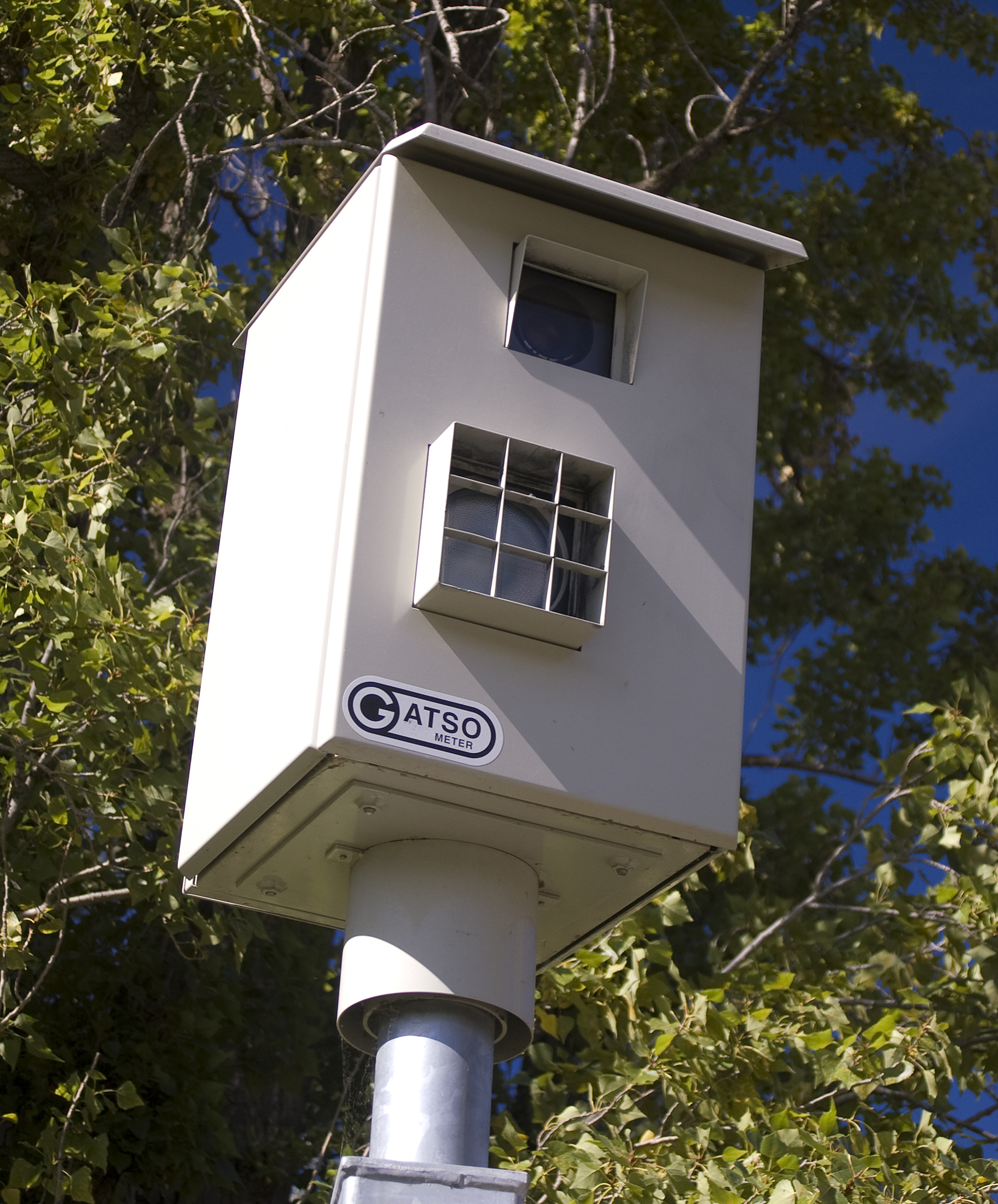
Gatso speed camera

Speed limits are enforced on most public roadways by authorities, with the purpose to improve driver compliance with speed limits. Methods used include roadside speed traps set up and operated by the police and automated roadside "speed camera" systems, which may incorporate the use of an automatic number plate recognition system. Traditionally, police officers used stopwatches to measure the time taken for a vehicle to cover a known distance. More recently, radar guns and automated in-vehicle systems have come into use.

A worldwide review of studies found that speed cameras led to a reduction of "11% to 44% for fatal and serious injury crashes". The UK Department for Transport estimated that cameras had led to a 22% reduction in personal injury collisions and 42% fewer people being killed or seriously injured at camera sites. The British Medical Journal recently reported that speed cameras were effective at reducing accidents and injuries in their vicinity and recommended wider deployment. An LSE study in 2017 found that "adding another 1,000 cameras to British roads could save up to 190 lives annually, reduce up to 1,130 collisions and mitigate 330 serious injuries."

== History ==
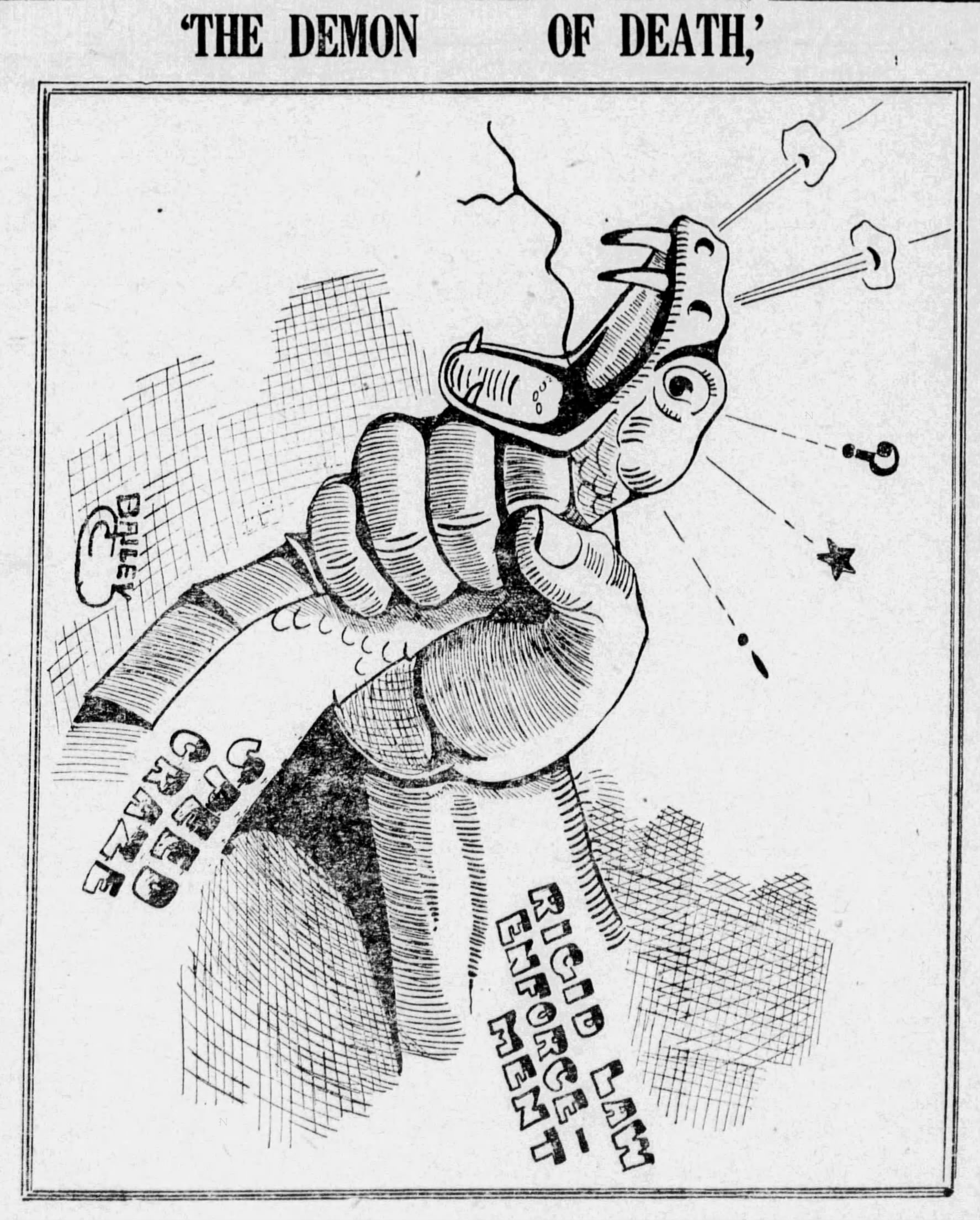
Anti-speeding illustration (1926)

The use of speed limits pre-dates both motorized vehicles and enforcement of the laws. Facing the invention of the automobile, many nations enacted speed limit laws, and appropriate measures to enforce them. The Locomotive Acts in the UK set speed limits for vehicles, and later codified enforcement methods. The first Locomotive Act, passed in 1861, set a speed limit of 10 miles per hour (16 km/h) in uninhabited areas, and 5 miles per hour (8.0 km/h) within towns. This act also included the value of fines for violations of the law.

Stricter regulations came in the Locomotive Act 1865, which required a man with a red flag to walk 60 yards (55 m) ahead of qualifying powered vehicles. The distance ahead of the pedestrian crew member was reduced to 20 yards (18 m) in 1878 and the vehicles were required to stop on the sight of a horse. The speed limit was effectively redundant as vehicle speeds could not exceed the speed at which a person could walk.

By 1895, some drivers of early lightweight steam-powered autocars assumed that these would be legally classed as a horseless carriage and would therefore be exempt from the need for a preceding pedestrian. A test case was brought by motoring pioneer John Henry Knight, who was subsequently convicted of using a locomotive without a licence. The Locomotives on Highways Act 1896 lifted some of the restrictions introduced by the 1865 Act, notably raising the speed limit for "light locomotives" under three tonnes to 14 miles per hour (23 km/h). The speed limit was lifted again by the Motor Car Act 1903 to 20 miles per hour (32 km/h).

A royal commission on motorcars in the UK reported in 1907 and raised concerns about the manner in which speed traps were being used to raise revenue in rural areas rather than being used to protect lives in towns. In parliamentary debates at the time it was observed that "Policemen are not stationed in the villages where there are people about who might be in danger, but are hidden in hedges or ditches by the side of the most open roads in the country" and were "manifestly absurd as a protection to the public, and they are used in many counties merely as a means of extracting money from the passing traveller in a way which reminds one of the highwaymen of the Middle Ages".

In 1905 The Automobile Association was formed to help motorists avoid police speed traps. Chief Justice, Lord Alverston brought a test court case in 1910 (Betts v Stevens) against an Automobile Association patrolman and a potentially speeding motorist—the judge ruled that where a patrolman signals to a speeding driver to slow down and thereby avoid a speed trap, that person would have committed the offence of "obstructing an officer in the course of his duty" under the Prevention of Crimes Amendment Act 1885. Subsequently, the organisation developed a coded warning system which was used until the 1960s whereby a patrolman would always salute the driver of a passing car that displayed a visible AA badge unless there was a speed trap nearby, on the understanding that their officers could not be prosecuted for failing to salute.

Gatsometer BV, founded in 1958 by rally driver Maurice Gatsonides, produced the 'Gatsometer' which was described as "a revolutionary speed-measuring device". Developed initially for improving his race times, it was later marketed as a police speed enforcement tool. Gatsometer claims to have developed the first radar for use with road traffic in 1971, but this claim is undermined by evidence that radar detectors were already for sale in 1967. Gatsometer BV produced the world's first mobile speed traffic camera in 1982.

VASCAR was in use in North Carolina, New York and Indiana by February 1968.

Kevin Richardson proposed the idea of rewarding drivers travelling at or below the posted limit with a cash lottery, funded by the fines on speeding drivers. This was demonstrated in Stockholm, Sweden, in November 2010.

== Methods ==
Speed limits were originally enforced by manually timing or "clocking" vehicles travelling through "speed traps" defined between two fixed landmarks along a roadway that were a known distance apart; the vehicle's average speed was then determined by dividing the distance travelled by the time taken to travel it. Setting up a speed trap that could provide legally satisfactory evidence was usually time-consuming and error-prone, as it relied on its human operators.

The method of enforcement can be classified by:

- measuring the instantaneous speed at a point or the average speed between two widely spaced points some minutes or hours apart
- temporary, moving or permanent location
- human operator or automated operation
- all vehicles measured like a census, or only a selected sample of vehicles.

=== Average speed measurement ===
VASCAR is a device that semi-automates the timing and average speed calculation of the original manually operated "speed trap". An observer on the ground, in a vehicle or in the air simply presses a button as a vehicle passes two landmarks that are a known distance apart, typically several hundred metres.

Automatic number plate recognition (ANPR) systems that use a form of optical character recognition read the vehicle's licence or registration plate. A computer system reads vehicle registration plates at two or more fixed points along a road, usually hundreds of meters or even kilometers apart, then uses the known distance between them to calculate a vehicle's average speed. From the mean value theorem, we know that the vehicle's speed must equal its average speed at some time between the measurements. If the average speed exceeds the speed limit, then a penalty is automatically issued.

Police in some countries like France have been known to prosecute drivers for speeding, using an average speed calculated from timestamps on toll road tickets.

Speed enforcement using average speed measurement is expressly prohibited in California.

=== Instantaneous speed measurement ===
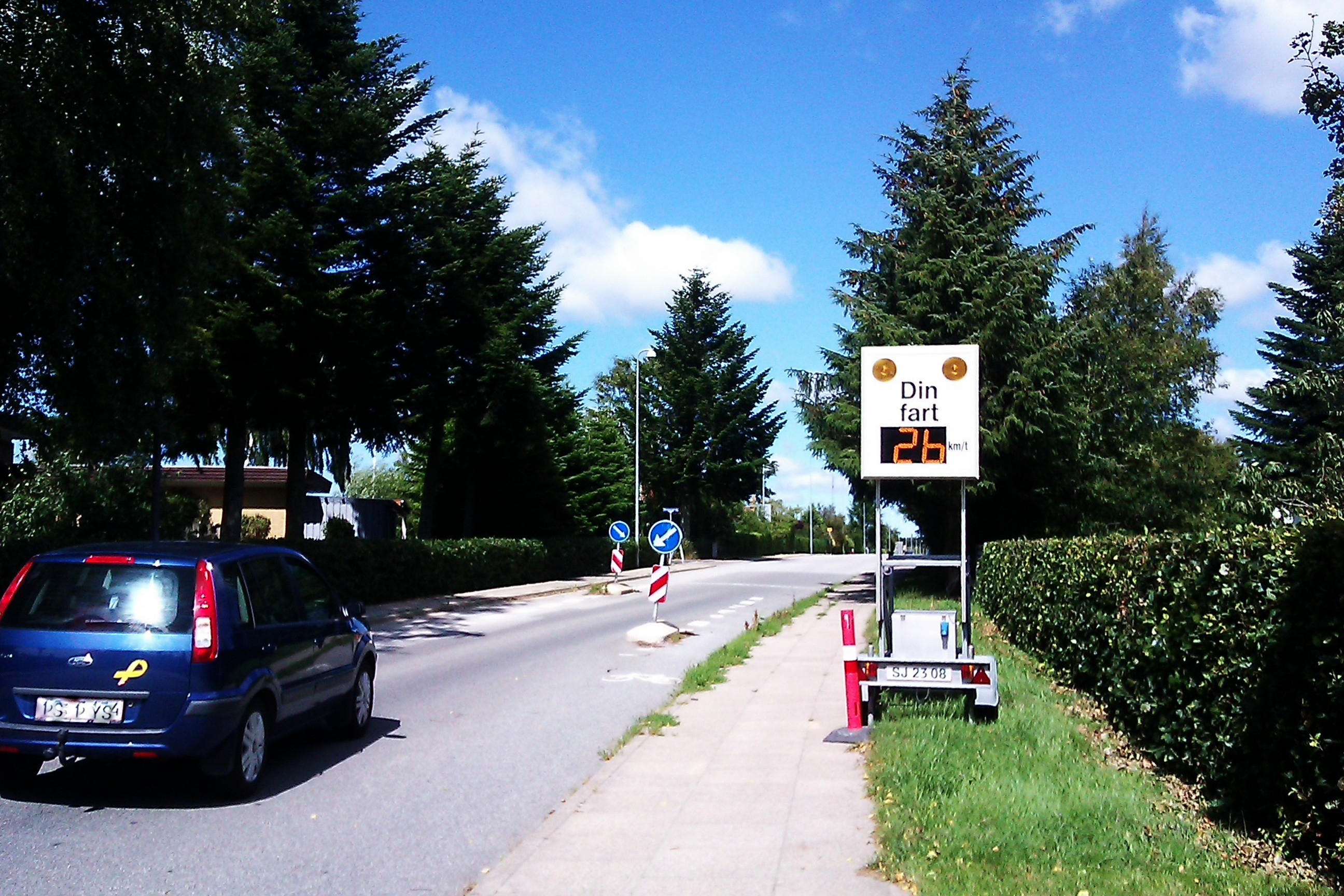
Automatic traffic speed measurement in Denmark

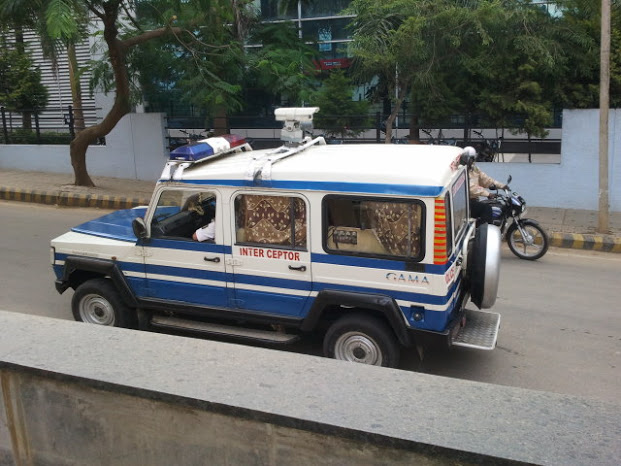
Traffic Speed Interceptor - Vehicles with speed camera used by Bangalore Police, India

Instantaneous speed cameras measure the speed at a single point. These may either be a semi-permanent fixture or be established on a temporary basis. A variety of technologies can be used:

- Radar speed guns use a microwave signal that is directed at a vehicle; the Doppler effect is used to derive its speed.
- LIDAR speed guns utilize the time of flight of laser pulses to make a series of timestamped measurements of a vehicle's distance from the laser; the data is then used to calculate the vehicle's speed.
- Sensors embedded in the roadway in pairs, for example electromagnetic induction or Piezo-electric strips a set distance apart.
- Infra-red light sensors located perpendicular to the road, e.g. TIRTL.
- In the early days of vehicle speed enforcement, the police primarily used two pneumatic road tubes placed a short distance apart. This measures the time vehicles take to travel between the two tubes, and the travel speed can be derived from it. The short distance between the two tubes was called a "trap" and hence the colloquial term "speed trap" that describes any police speed monitoring location.

=== Pacing ===
Officers in some jurisdictions may also use pacing, particularly where a more convenient radar speed measuring device is not available—a police vehicle's speed is matched to that of a target vehicle, and the calibrated speedometer of the patrol car used to infer the other vehicle's speed.

=== Cameras ===
In recent years many jurisdictions began using cameras to record violators. These devices detect vehicles that are exceeding the speed limit and take photos of these vehicles' license plates. A ticket is then mailed out to the registered owner.

=== Other ===
Some jurisdictions, such as Australia and Ohio, allow prosecutions based on a subjective speed assessment by a police officer. In the future, there is the potential to track speed limit compliance via GPS black boxes for recidivist speeders identified in the Australian National Road Safety Strategy 2011 - 2020 section on Intelligent speed adaptation.

== Effectiveness ==
=== Speed cameras ===
- Aside from the issues of legality in some countries and states and of sometime opposition the effectiveness of speed cameras is very well documented. The introduction to The Effectiveness of Speed Cameras A review of evidence by Richard Allsop includes the following in the foreword by Stephen Glaister, director of the RAC (Royal Automobile Club). "While this report fully lays out the background to the introduction of speed cameras and the need for speed limits, its job is not to justify why the national limits are what they are; a review of speed limits to see whether they are soundly based is for another day. What it has done is to show that at camera sites, speeds have been reduced, and that as a result, collisions resulting in injuries have fallen. The government has said that a decision on whether speed cameras should be funded must be taken at a local level. With the current pressure on public funds, there will be – indeed there already are – those who say that what little money there is can be better spent. This report begs to differ. The devices are already there; they demonstrate value for money, yet are not significant revenue raisers for the Treasury; they are shown to save lives; and despite the headlines, most people accept the need for them. Speed cameras should never be the only weapon in the road safety armoury, but neither should they be absent from the battle."
- The 2010 Cochrane Review of speed cameras for the prevention of road traffic injuries and deaths reported that all 28 studies accepted by the authors found the effect of speed cameras to be a reduction in all crashes, injury crashes, and death or severe injury crashes. "Twenty eight studies measured the effect on crashes. All 28 studies found a lower number of crashes in the speed camera areas after implementation of the program. In the vicinity of camera sites, the reductions ranged from 8% to 49% for all crashes, with reductions for most studies in the 14% to 25% range. For injury crashes the decrease ranged between 8% and 50% and for crashes resulting in fatalities or serious injuries the reductions were in the range of 11% to 44%. Effects over wider areas showed reductions for all crashes ranging from 9% to 35%, with most studies reporting reductions in the 11% to 27% range. For crashes resulting in death or serious injury reductions ranged from 17% to 58%, with most studies reporting this result in the 30% to 40% reduction range. The studies of longer duration showed that these positive trends were either maintained or improved with time. Nevertheless, the authors conceded that the magnitude of the benefit from speed cameras "is currently not deducible" due to limitations in the methodological rigor of many of the 28 studies cited, and recommended that "more studies of a scientifically rigorous and homogenous nature are necessary, to provide the answer to the magnitude of effect."
- According to the 2003 NCHRP study on Red Light Running (RLR), "RLR automated enforcement can be an effective safety countermeasure....[I]t appears from the findings of several studies that, in general, RLR cameras can bring about a reduction in the more severe angle crashes with, at worst, a slight increase in less severe rear-end crashes. However it noted that "there is not enough empirical evidence based on proper experimental design procedures to state this conclusively."
- The 2010 report, "The Effectiveness of Speed Cameras A review of evidence", by Richard Allsop concludes "The findings of this review for the RAC Foundation, though reached independently, are essentially consistent with the Cochrane Review conclusions. They are also broadly consistent with the findings of a meta-analysis reported in the respected Handbook of Road Safety Measures, of 16 studies, not including the four-year evaluation report, of the effects of fixed cameras on numbers of collisions and casualties."
- A recent study conducted in Alabama reveals that Red Light Cameras (RLCs) seem to have a slight impact on the clearance lost time; the intersections equipped with RLCs are half a second less in use compared with those without cameras; and highway capacity manual estimates a shorter lost time and thus may overestimate the intersection's capacity.
- In 2001 the Nottingham Safety Camera Pilot achieved "virtually complete compliance" on the major ring road into the city using average speed cameras, across all Nottinghamshire SPECS installations, KSI (Killed / Seriously Injured) figures have fallen by an average of 65%.
- In 2003 Injury Prevention reported that speed cameras were effective at reducing accidents and injuries and recommended wider deployment. In February 2005 the British Medical Journal reported that speed cameras were an effective intervention in reducing road traffic collisions and related casualties, noting however that most studies to date did not have satisfactory control groups. In 2003 Northumbria Police's Acting Chief Inspector of motor patrols suggested that cameras didn't reduce casualties but did raise revenue – an official statement from the police force later re-iterated that speed cameras do reduce casualties.
- In December 2005 the Department for Transport published a four-year report into Safety Camera Partnerships which concluded that there was a 22% reduction in personal injury collisions and 42% fewer people being killed or seriously injured following the installation of cameras. The Times reported that this research showed that the department had been previous exaggerating the safety benefits of speed cameras but that the results were still 'impressive'.
- A report published by the RAC Foundation in 2010 estimated that an additional 800 more people a year could be killed or seriously injured on the UK's roads if all speed cameras were scrapped. A survey conducted by The Automobile Association in May 2010 indicated that speed cameras were supported by 75% of their members.
- The town of Swindon abandoned the use of fixed cameras in 2009, questioning their cost-effectiveness with the cameras being replaced by vehicle-activated warning signs and enforcement by police using mobile speed cameras: in the nine months following the switch-off there was a small reduction in accident rates which had changed slightly in similar periods before and after the switch off (Before: 1 fatal, 1 serious and 13 slight accidents. Afterwards: no fatalities, 2 serious and 12 slight accidents). The journalist George Monbiot claimed that the results were not statistically significant highlighting earlier findings across the whole of Wiltshire that there had been a 33% reduction in the number of people killed and seriously injured generally and a 68% reduction at camera sites during the previous 3 years. In 2012, the town had the fewest accident rates per 1,000 registered vehicles: a result linked by the Local Authority Member for Council Transformation, Transport and Strategic Planning to the removal of speed cameras and resultant additional funding for road safety, alongside close working with the police.

== Evidence gathering ==
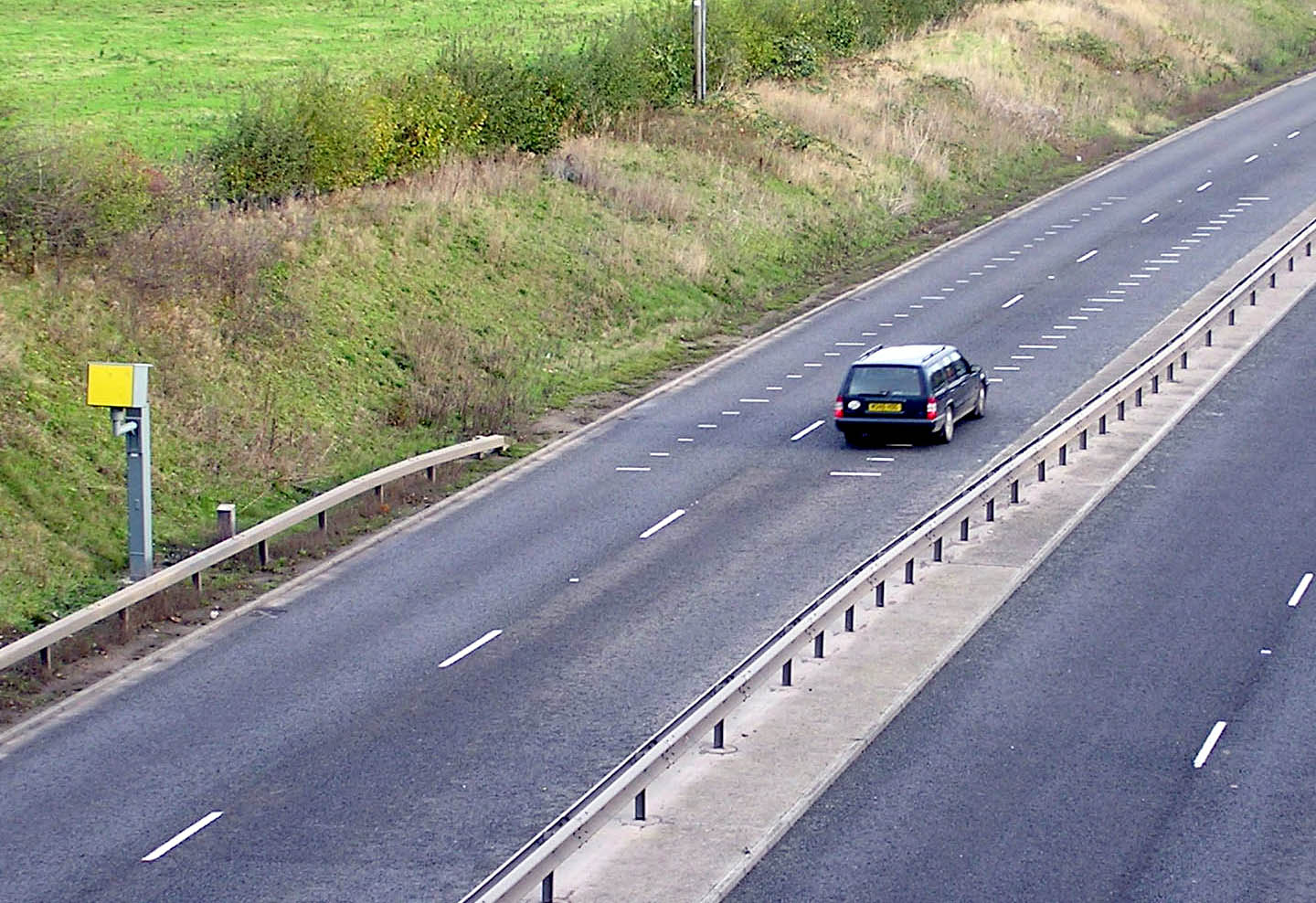
UK fixed speed camera with road calibration markings

While digital cameras can be used as the primary means of speed detection when combined with automatic number plate recognition (ANPR) average-speed camera systems, their use is more commonly restricted to evidence gathering where speeding offences are detected by various other types of sensors such as Doppler radar, piezo strips, infrared or laser devices.

Photographs are typically time-stamped by a high-resolution timing device so that a vehicle's speed can be checked manually after the fact if necessary using the secondary method of calculating its speed between a series of calibrated lines painted on the road surface.

The change from analogue "wet film" to digital technology has revolutionised speed cameras, particularly their maintenance and the back-office processing required to issue penalty notices. Images from digital cameras can be uploaded in seconds to a remote office over a network link, while optical character recognition software can record vehicle registration numbers.

Types of camera include Gatso, Truvelo Combi and D-cam.

== Avoidance and evasion ==
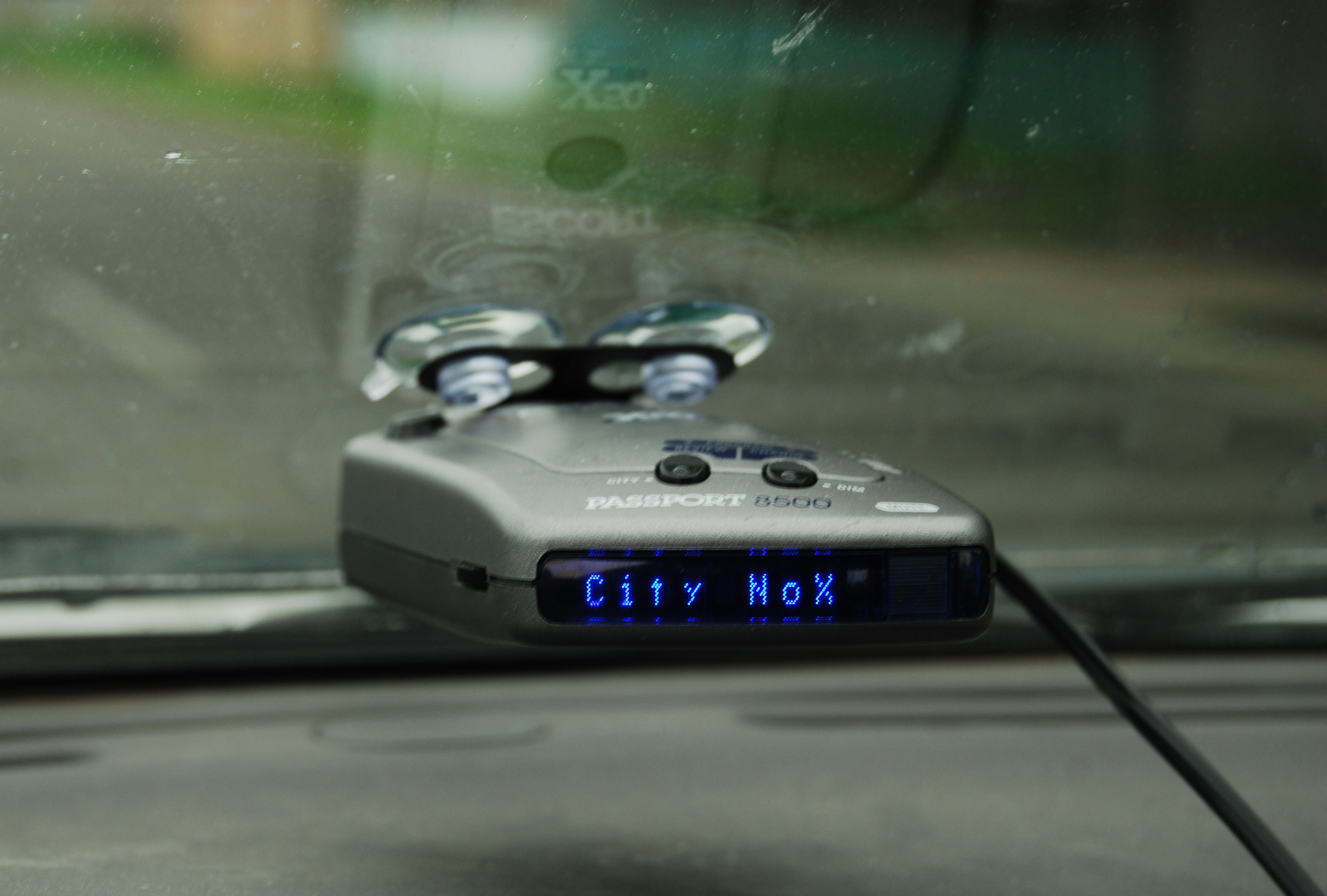
Passive RADAR and LIDAR detector

Some drivers use passive radar detectors or LIDAR detectors to detect police radar or LIDAR signals, with the intention of avoiding or evading prosecution by slowing down before entering an enforcement zone. The legal standing of these types of devices varies by jurisdiction. For example, they are legal in most of the United States, but not in most of Canada. Active devices might also be used—in this instance, radar or LIDAR signals are typically jammed with counter emissions. These devices are more frequently illegal than passive devices.

Drivers may flash their lights to approaching drivers to warn them of a speed trap. The legal standing of this action also varies by jurisdiction. In the United States, it is common for motorists with Citizen's Band (CB) radios to report the location of speed traps over the CB radio to other motorists.

In 2006, the UK Automobile Association controversially published a road map that included the location for thousands of speed cameras—the first time such information was available in printed form, although more accurate and frequently updated GPS-based information was freely available for some time before that.

Mobile applications such as Njection, Trapster, and Waze provide mobile information to drivers on speed traps and traffic conditions. These applications rely on users to keep the databases current. In addition to mobile applications that might be considered evasion-centric, there are other similar mobile applications that are classified as Intelligent speed adaptation technologies that are considered too compliance centric and in Australia both National and State Road Safety Strategies encourage the adoption of such technologies.

In Belgium, Germany, and the Netherlands, the location of speed traps are announced using the Highway location marker at regular intervals on major radio stations. Conversely, announcing the exact location of a speed trap is illegal in France.

== Controversy ==
Groups such as the National Motorists Association define speed trap more narrowly as a place where "traffic enforcement is focused on extracting revenue from drivers instead of improving safety". When highway speed limits drop suddenly just as the road enters a municipality that collects large amounts of revenue from traffic tickets, a safety hazard can be introduced, and efforts have been made in the U.S. to ban this practice. Some police forces have even been forced to disband as a result of overzealous enforcement. However, a meta-analysis of studies finds automated ticketing machines that enforce speed limits may have reduced the number of traffic injuries and deaths.

== Tolerances ==
Speed limits may not be enforced for speeds close to the legal limit. In the United States, speeding enforcement tolerance is usually up to the discretion of the arresting officer. Some states (such as Pennsylvania and Florida) have official tolerances.

As older vehicle construction regulations allowed a speedometer accuracy of +/- 10%, in the United Kingdom ACPO guidelines recommend a tolerance level of the speed limit "×10% +2 mph" (e.g., a maximum tolerance in a 30 mph (50 km/h) zone of 30 + (30 × 10% = 3) + 2 = 35 mph).

In Germany, at least a 3 km/h tolerance (3% of measured speed when speeding over 100 km/h) in favor of the offender is always deducted. This tolerance can increase up to 20% depending on the method of measurement. Fines for speeding depend on how high above the speed limit the measured speed is and where the offense occurred. Speeding in built-up areas invariably carries higher fines than outside city limits. While fines for minor offenses tend to be moderate, speeds in excess of 20 km/h (12 mph) above the limit in built-up areas result in distinctly higher fines and points on the driver's license, and, depending on the speed at which the offender was clocked, may lead to a driving ban of at least one month.

The state of Victoria in Australia allows for only a 3 km/h (1.9 mph) tolerance for mobile speed cameras and 2 km/h (1.2 mph) for fixed cameras on the basis that, although the increased risk is lower, there are very many more drivers involved, which creates a substantial risk across the road network. An alternative view is that police devices are accurate to 1 km/h, and that a 2–3 km/h tolerance is the minimum margin that police require to defeat any challenge in court regarding the accuracy of their speed measurement equipment. Speed tolerance in New South Wales was an election issue in 2011, following a move by the budget committee of the previous Labor state government to abolish the 3 km/h margin in order to increase revenue.

In Mexico, the maximum speed limit is 80 kilometres per hour (50 mph) on urban freeways on other urban roads. However, fines are only given when speeding above 90 kilometres per hour (56 mph), thus giving a 10 kilometres per hour (6.2 mph) tolerance. The Mexican highway patrol (Mexico City) and traffic law enforcement officers (Guadalajara) may enforce speed laws only when a car is speeding above reasonable speeds in regard of the amount of traffic. Maximum speed for all Mexican highways is 110 kilometres per hour (68 mph). Speeding fines are given to those going 130 kilometres per hour (81 mph) and up to 220 kilometres per hour (140 mph). Police may however place a squad car as a pace car so drivers behind cannot exceed 100 kilometres per hour (62 mph); this is common during Summer and Winter holiday season.

Speed limit policy can affect enforcement. According to a 1994 report by the AASHTO, "experience has shown that speed limits set arbitrarily below the reasonable and prudent speed perceived by the public are difficult to enforce, produce noncompliance, encourage disrespect for the law, create unnecessary antagonism toward law enforcement officers, and divert traffic to lesser routes".

A study of over 1,000 drivers caught speeding in the U.S. and in Canada examined factors that predicted fines issued by police officers. In both countries, drivers were stopped for speeding on average 16 mph (26 km/h) over the speed limit and received fines of approximately US$144. As expected, drivers traveling at higher speeds over the limit received higher fines. What drivers said to the police also affected the amount of the fine. 46% percent of drivers in the study reported offering an excuse (e.g. "I didn't realize the speed I was driving"), which was the most common type of verbal response. Excuses, justifications, and denials did not reduce the amount of the fine. Almost 30% of drivers expressed remorse (e.g., "I'm sorry") and received a considerable reduction in fines. Offers of remorse were most effective at higher speeds over the limit. For example, American speeders who offered remorse for traveling at higher speeds over the limit (21 mph) received fines that were US$49 lower than drivers who were speeding the same amount, but did not offer an apology. Although this research indicated that apologies can be related to lower fines for speeding, most drivers who offered remorse were still punished to some degree. To maintain a relatively normal sample of speeders, a small percentage of drivers who reported extreme speeds (80 km/h (50 mph) or more over the limit) or very severe fines (US$500 or more) were excluded.

== Law enforcement approaches ==
Authorities are not able to monitor every vehicle on every road—limited resources generally mean that enforcement needs to be targeted. A New Zealand study concluded that actual enforcement as well as the perceived chance of being caught both contributed to changes in drivers' behaviour.

=== Jurisdictional reciprocity ===
Many jurisdictions operate traffic violations reciprocity where non-resident drivers are treated like residents when they are stopped for a traffic offense that occurs in another jurisdiction. They also ensure that penalties such as demerit points and the ensuing increase in insurance premiums follow the driver home. The general principle of such interstate, inter-provincial, and/or international compacts is to guarantee the rule 'one license, one record.'

== Extrajudicial enforcement ==
In 2001, Acme-Rent-a-Car in Connecticut controversially tried to use a contractual clause in the rental agreement to issue speeding fines to any of its customers that exceeded speed limits as detected by GPS tracking units its cars. The company actions were challenged and defeated in court.

=== Photo-enforcement employee deaths ===
Doug Georgianni, 51, was shot as he operated a photo radar van on a Phoenix freeway and later died at a hospital.

=== Reprisal attacks on equipment ===
Retribution attacks on photo enforcement equipment have become commonplace throughout the world.

== Regional issues ==
=== Australia ===
==== New South Wales ====
In August 2005, in Sydney, a speed camera photograph was challenged on the basis that an MD5 cryptographic hash function used to protect the digital photograph from tampering was not robust enough to guarantee that it had not been altered. Magistrate Lawrence Lawson demanded that the Roads & Traffic Authority (RTA) produce an expert witness who could prove the photographs were tamper-proof, but the RTA was unable to provide such evidence. The defendant was acquitted and awarded court costs.

In June 2011, the Government of New South Wales was reported to have raised A$350 million over the previous five years from speed cameras. The Roads Minister accused the previous Labor government of using speed cameras to raise revenue; the Auditor-General was therefore tasked with investigating all 141 fixed speed cameras in use throughout the state. Following the release of the report, 38 speed cameras, located primarily on highways, were switched off after the Auditor-General determined that they had no significant road safety benefit. The report found the majority of fixed-speed cameras had a proven road safety benefit. The report also concluded that it was "too early" to conclude if mobile speed cameras affected road safety, although early results indicated drivers might be speeding less. To address public concerns, the RTA would now monitor the effectiveness of individual fixed-speed cameras annually.

==== South Australia ====
In 2010/11, the Government of South Australia raised A$114 million from speed limit enforcement activities. The SA government are resisting moves by their opposition to commission an inquiry into whether speed cameras are being used effectively and efficiently: to improve road safety, to raise revenue, or both.

==== Victoria ====
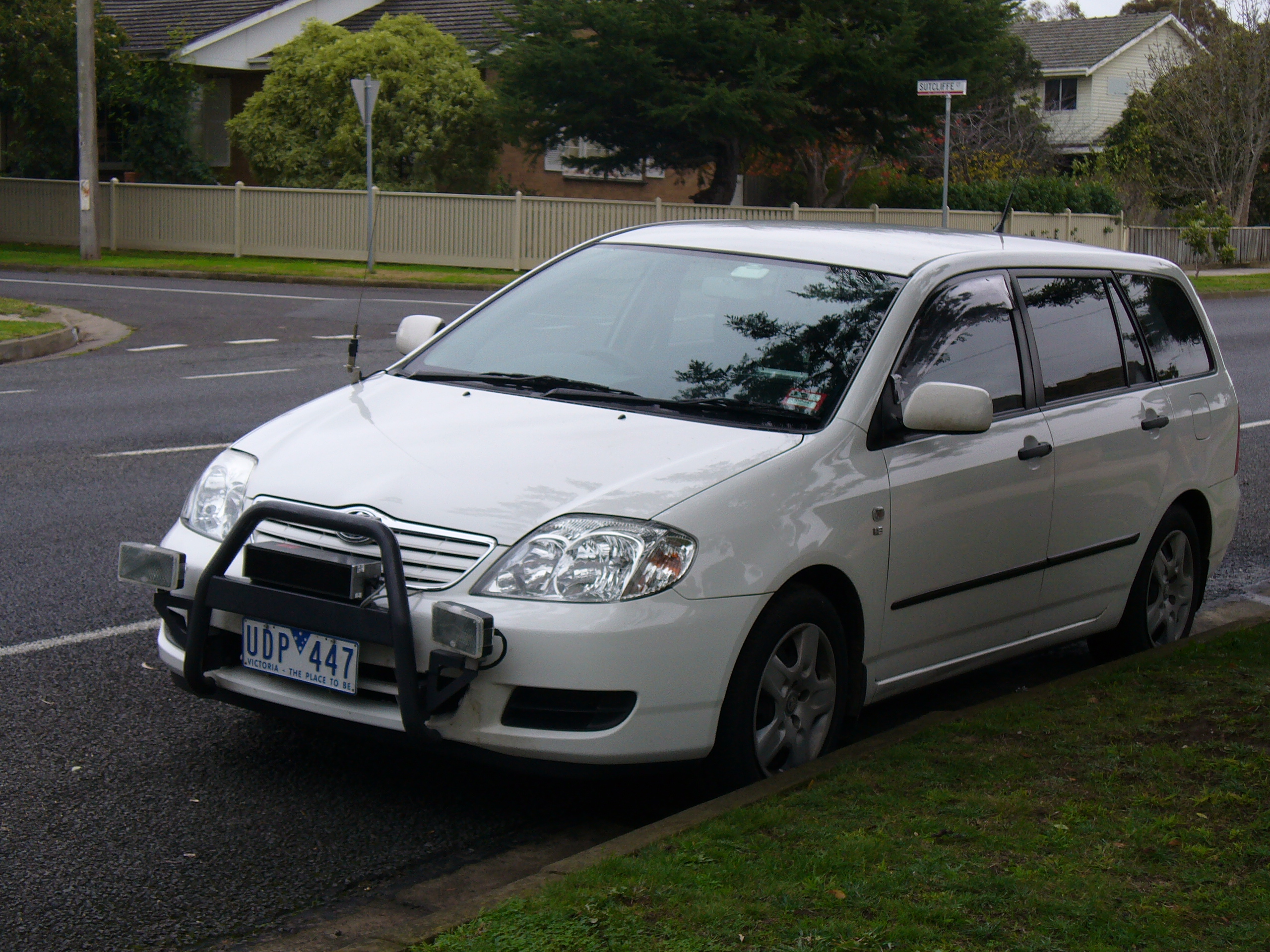
Gatso Mobile Speed Camera, used in Victoria, Australia. The camera is mounted on the passenger side dash, whilst the black box on the front is the radar unit.

In 2004, in a Poltech fixed speed camera on Melbourne's Western Ring Road recorded a four-cylinder Datsun 120Y sedan travelling at 158 km/h, but testing found this vehicle only capable of 117 km/h. A Victorian state government inquiry found that maintenance and accuracy checks had not been done regularly.

Victoria achieved record-low road fatalities in both 2008 and 2009. Newspaper reports credited a coordinated and well-funded campaign that focused on higher risk young drivers, more aggressive policing, increased police activity, drink driving, and in 2009, a 50% increase in the use of mobile speed cameras.

After a growing number of complaints about incorrect and inappropriate fines, Victoria's Auditor-General plans to investigate whether speed cameras are being used primarily to raise revenue for the state government rather than to improve road safety.

In 2011, a total of 288 fatalities were reported on roads in Victoria. In a period up until June, the amount of fatalities were reported as being "significantly higher" than it was for the same period of the previous year.

The Victoria government collected nearly A$250 million from fines levied on drivers breaking Victorian road rules, a large proportion being from speed limit enforcement, in 2011.

=== Canada ===
Speed limit enforcement cameras were a substantial election issue in the provinces of Ontario and British Columbia, and were abolished by Premiers Mike Harris in 1995 and Gordon Campbell in 2001.

In February 2006, Edmonton, Alberta, erupted in scandal when it was alleged that two police officers accepted bribes from private contractors who received lucrative contracts to provide speed limit enforcement cameras. The officers and contractor involved now face criminal charges that remain before the courts.

In September 2012, Edmonton police chief Rod Knecht proposed that "excessive speeders" should have their vehicles seized and impounded, after a rash of high speeding drivers were charged, many driving 50 – 100 km/h over the speed limit.

In 2025, there was controversy in Ontario surrounding automated speed enforcement that led to a province-wide ban of such devices.

=== United Kingdom ===
The United Kingdom uses a variety of methods to enforce its road speed limits including average and instantaneous speed cameras; however, eight counties are to switch off or remove cameras and a further two counties are considering such action.

There has also been debate as to whether the use of such cameras in order to force a driver to confess to the crime of speeding is in violation of European basic human rights; however, in 2007 the European Court of Human Rights, in O'Halloran and Francis v United Kingdom, found there was no breach of article 6 of the Human Rights Act 1998 in requiring the keepers of cars caught speeding on camera to provide the name of the driver, or to be subject to criminal penalty of an equivalent degree of severity if they failed to do so.

The number of designated traffic officers fell from 15 to 20% of Police force strength in 1966 to seven percent of force strength in 1998, and between 1999 and 2004 by 21%. It is an item of debate whether the reduction in traffic accidents per 100 million miles driven over this time has been due to robotic enforcement. In the seven-month period following speed cameras in Oxfordshire being switched off in August 2010, fatalities increased from 12 to 18, a figure not out of line with the variation in fatalities over a ten-year period. Plans had been made to switch the cameras back on by November 2010, on the basis of increased speeds at camera sites, which occurred in April 2011. Oxfordshire had followed the lead of Swindon, which encountered a decline in casualties, serious injuries, and fatalities.

A 2017 Freedom of Information request found that 52% of speed cameras in the UK were switched on. The report showed that four out of the 45 police forces in the UK had no working speed cameras and that West Yorkshire, South Yorkshire, Greater Manchester, Kent and Cheshire police forces had a quarter or less active cameras. The report found that City of London, Metropolitan Police/TfL, Lancashire, Nottinghamshire, Suffolk and Northern Ireland police forces said that all of their cameras are active. The reason for this has been a cut in funding and many cameras, most notably many Gatso and Truvelo Combi speed cameras, still used older film technologies rather than newer digital technologies.

=== United States ===
==== Speed cameras and automated enforcement ====
The NHTSA issued operational guidelines in 2008 for states and communities implementing speed camera programs. The guidelines cover such topics as planning, site selection, system procurement, public awareness, processing notices of violations, and evaluating the programs.

==== Local implementations ====
As of 2009, speed cameras existed in 48 communities in the United States, including in Arizona, Colorado, Illinois, Iowa, Louisiana, Maryland, Massachusetts, New Mexico, Ohio, Oregon, Tennessee, Washington, and Washington, D.C. As of August 2020, this number increased to 152 communities.

===== Authorities =====
In the U.S. state of Ohio, the issue of whether a city has jurisdiction under the Ohio Constitution to issue citations based on speed cameras was heard by the Ohio Supreme Court on 18 September 2007, in the case of Kelly Mendenhall et al. v. The City of Akron et al. The court ruled in favor of Kelly Mendenhall.

Initially, Illinois used photo enforcement for construction zones only. There was legislation on the books to expand that throughout the state. However, Chicago has expanded its red light camera program and is planning to put speed cameras in school zones. Some suburbs (e.g. Alsip) already have cameras at various intersections.

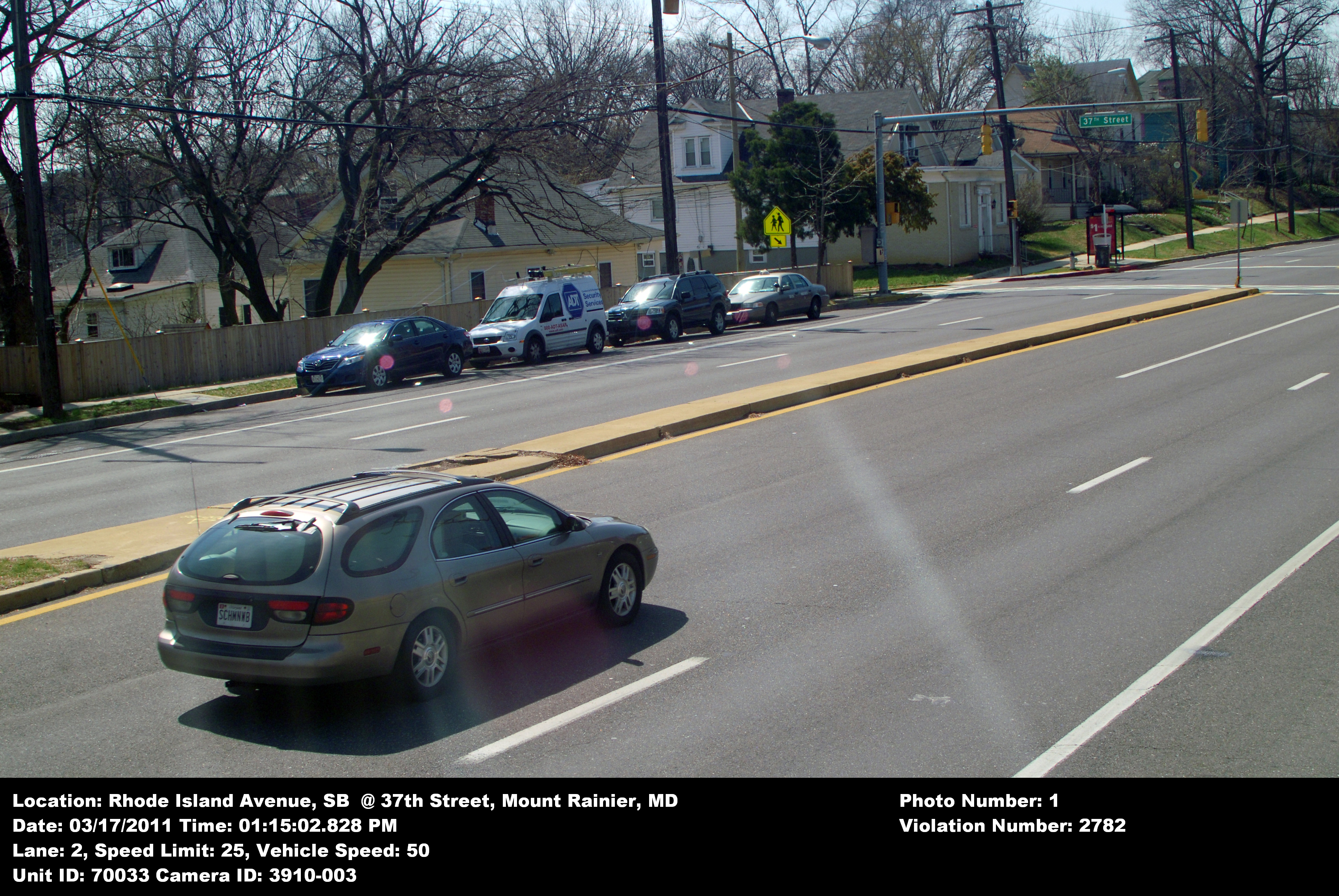
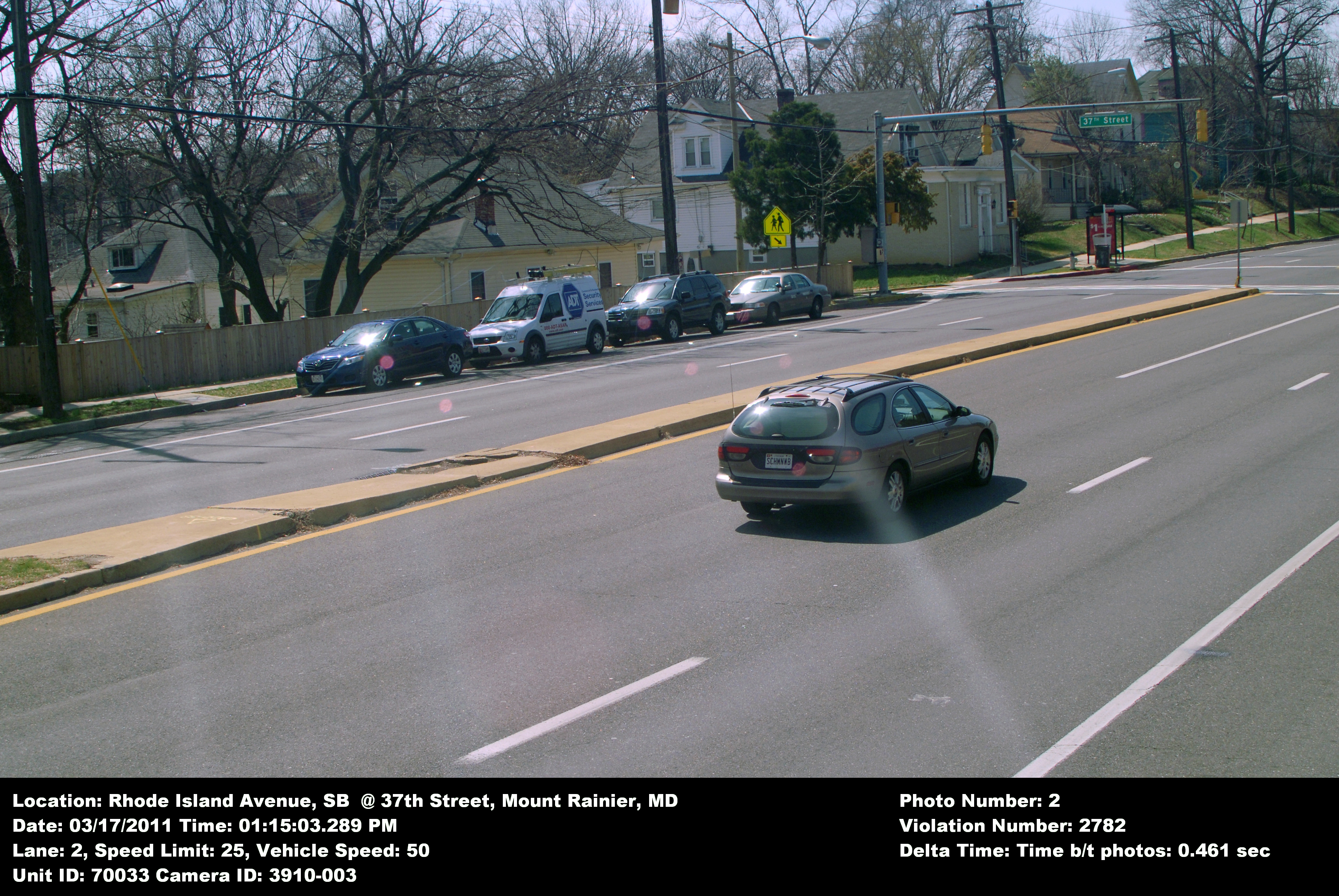
Two images from a speed enforcement camera in Mount Rainier, Maryland, documenting a vehicle alleged to be traveling 50 mph in a 25 mph zone

Some U.S. states that formerly allowed red-light enforcement cameras but not speed limit enforcement cameras ('photo radar'), have now approved, or are considering, the implementation of speed limit enforcement cameras. The Maryland legislature approved such a program in January 2006. In 2005, 2006, 2008 and 2009 the California legislature considered, but did not pass, bills to implement speed limit enforcement cameras. Tennessee legislators are also considering expanding their speed limit enforcement cameras after successes in Chattanooga such as generating $158,811 in revenue in the first three months.

A 2007 study of speed cameras on the Arizona State Route 101 in Scottsdale found a 50% reduction in the total crash frequency, with injuries falling by 40%; however, rear-end collisions increased by 55%.

As of late 2008, cameras were placed along all Phoenix area freeways capturing drivers doing speeds greater than 11 mph over the posted speed limit. Over 100 new cameras were expected to be up and running by 2009.

In 2017, the National Safety Council graded states on road safety measures such as automated enforcement of speeding or red light cameras, interstate speed limits, and lower speed limits in school zones.

==== Operators of automated enforcement equipment ====
In the United States, it is common for all installation, operation, and verification procedures to be carried out by private companies that in some States receive payment based on the number of infringements they issue, and often under no testing regime whatsoever; however, these units are required by law to take at least two pictures of each vehicle.

It has been announced that Arizona will not renew its contract with Redflex, the company that operates the cameras. However, many towns in Arizona (e.g. Chandler, Mesa, Scottsdale, Paradise Valley, Superior) still have red light and/or speed cameras. Photo enforcement is illegal in the town of Gilbert, Arizona. Tempe, Arizona has removed all of its red light cameras. Baker, Louisiana still contracts with Redflex. This association is the subject of legislative action.

==== Opposition to automated enforcement ====
Opposition groups have formed in some locations where automated traffic enforcement has been used. In the US city of Scottsdale, Arizona, an activist group CameraFraud was formed and staged sign-wave protests and petition drives to oppose the use of speed limit enforcement cameras ('photo radar'). In the 2008 elections in nearby Pinal County, Paul Babeau won an election for sheriff after making a campaign promise to eliminate speed cameras.

As of 2020, eight states prohibit the use of automated enforcement.

==== Speed traps ====
Some jurisdictions in the United States have been found to fine motorists merely to generate revenue, rather than purely to assure safe driving, taking advantage of their unfamiliarity of the area or unwillingness to fight an out-of-town traffic ticket to assure them a constant stream of municipal funding. In the Southern United States, some towns have annexed thin strips of land far away from, and barely connected to, contiguous municipal limits to extend their authority along the highway to police stretches in isolated areas far away from any settlement or problem stretch of road which may justify a slower speed limit. In 2017 Damascus, Arkansas was investigated and prosecuted by state authorities for breaking state law by generating more than 30% of town revenue through traffic citations. In 2014, Waldo, Florida had its police department disbanded after the police were found to be issuing speeding tickets based on a quota system.

For decades, the American Automobile Association has published lists of 'speed trap towns' that motorists should avoid, to use an economic boycott to force towns to moderate their speed enforcement policies. These communities have had mixed results regarding campaigns against AAA to have their names removed from the list under the threat of economic ruin should motorists bypass those towns altogether. Many of the communities have also been successfully bypassed by states with divided highways rerouted to avoid these stretches of road after constituent complaints in addition to safety concerns.

Patagonia, Arizona, has been cited on the National Motorists Association's speedtrap.org website as having one of the nation's most active speed traps. City police regularly conceal their patrol cars behind trees along Arizona Highway 82 where motorists enter the city's outskirts. The legal speed limit drops in a short space from 55 mph to 30 mph, leading to some drivers who are not alert to be caught. The minimum fine for exceeding the posted speed limit even by 1 mph is $146.

=== France ===
In France, the fixed speed cameras on motorways are announced with a sign about half to 2 km before: Pour votre sécurité, contrôles automatiques (For your safety, automatic controls) and marked in French motorway maps. On non-motorway roads, sometimes there is a sign; however, in other locations an electronic sign showing your speed may indicate a fixed speed camera further along the road. Average speed cameras now operate in some areas. It is forbidden there to use speed camera detectors.

=== Switzerland ===
In Switzerland, it is strictly forbidden to announce speed controls. If the software of navigation equipment includes the locations of fixed speed cameras, the devices can be seized and destroyed. This also applies to mobile phones or handheld devices with the appropriate function.

=== Germany ===
In Germany, radar detectors are prohibited; however, current mobile controls are mentioned by some radio stations, which is not illegal.

=== Italy ===
In Italy, the fixed speed cameras on motorways and highways are announced with a sign no less than 250 meters before (no less than 150 meters on urban roads and no less than 80 meters on the other roads): Controllo elettronico della velocità, and marked in Italian road maps.

=== Netherlands ===
In the Netherlands, red light cameras are often combined with speed cameras in the same unit.

=== Spain and Portugal ===
In Spain and Portugal, devices are used to detect drivers who drive too fast, and consequently traffic lights turn to red to stop the vehicle.

== See also ==
- Speed limits by country
