= Leslie Gooday =

British architect (1921–2013)

- Born: 14 June 1921; Croydon
- Died: 16 March 2013 (aged 91)
- Occupation: Architect
- Awards: Order of the British Empire
- Practice: Leslie Gooday & Associates
- Buildings: Pools on the Park, Richmond, London; Longwall, St George's Hill, Weybridge, Surrey (both Grade II listed)

Leslie Gooday OBE (1921–2013) was a British architect.

== Biography ==
Gooday was born in the former Croydon registration district of Surrey on 14 June 1921. Elected to the Royal Institute of British Architects in 1951, he assisted Hugh Casson in designing the boating-pool and leisure area at the 1951 Festival of Britain on London's South Bank.

He designed, in 1961, the Grade II listed Richmond Baths, now known as Pools on the Park, a swimming pool and leisure facility in Old Deer Park in Richmond, London. Completed in 1966, it received a Civic Trust award in 1967 and is recognised by Historic England as illustrating "the more ambitious use of glazed curtain walling and the post-Wolfenden Report (Note: The Wolfenden Report referred to in this instance is that of the Committee on Sport & the Community, chaired by John Wolfenden, whose report, commissioned by the Central Council of Physical Recreation, reported in 1960. "Sport & the Community: the report of the Wolfenden committee on Sport 1960". Sports Development. 2 September 2012. Archived from the original on 19 October 2013.) emphasis on providing large banks of spectator seating".

His architectural practice, Leslie Gooday & Associates, based in East Molesey, Surrey, was appointed in 1967 to design the British pavilion at the Japan World Exposition at Osaka in 1970.

In 1956 he designed two houses in post-war modernism in Ham Farm Road, Ham, London which were cited by Nikolaus Pevsner as representative of the "quiet elegance of the modern style of the fifties". He also designed houses in other parts of the London Borough of Richmond upon Thames, the London Borough of Croydon, Surrey and East Sussex. The Bosphorus House in Kippington Road, Sevenoaks, Kent, that he designed in the 1960s, was described in the local volume of The Buildings of England in 1983 as "ingenious". He made alterations to the Latter-day Saint church building in Balham, London, in 1979–80.

He died on 16 March 2013.

== Personal homes ==
Gooday designed the two homes in which he lived successively with his wife Rosemary and children:

- 36 West Temple Sheen, East Sheen, London
- Longwall (built 1964–66) St George's Hill, Weybridge, Surrey – described in its statutory listing in the initial (Grade II) category as "perhaps his most successful work".

== Sources ==
- Cherry, Bridget and Pevsner, Nikolaus (1983). The Buildings of England – London 2: South. London: Penguin Books. p. 93. ISBN 0-14-0710-47-7.
