= Speed limits in Denmark =

Speed limits in Denmark

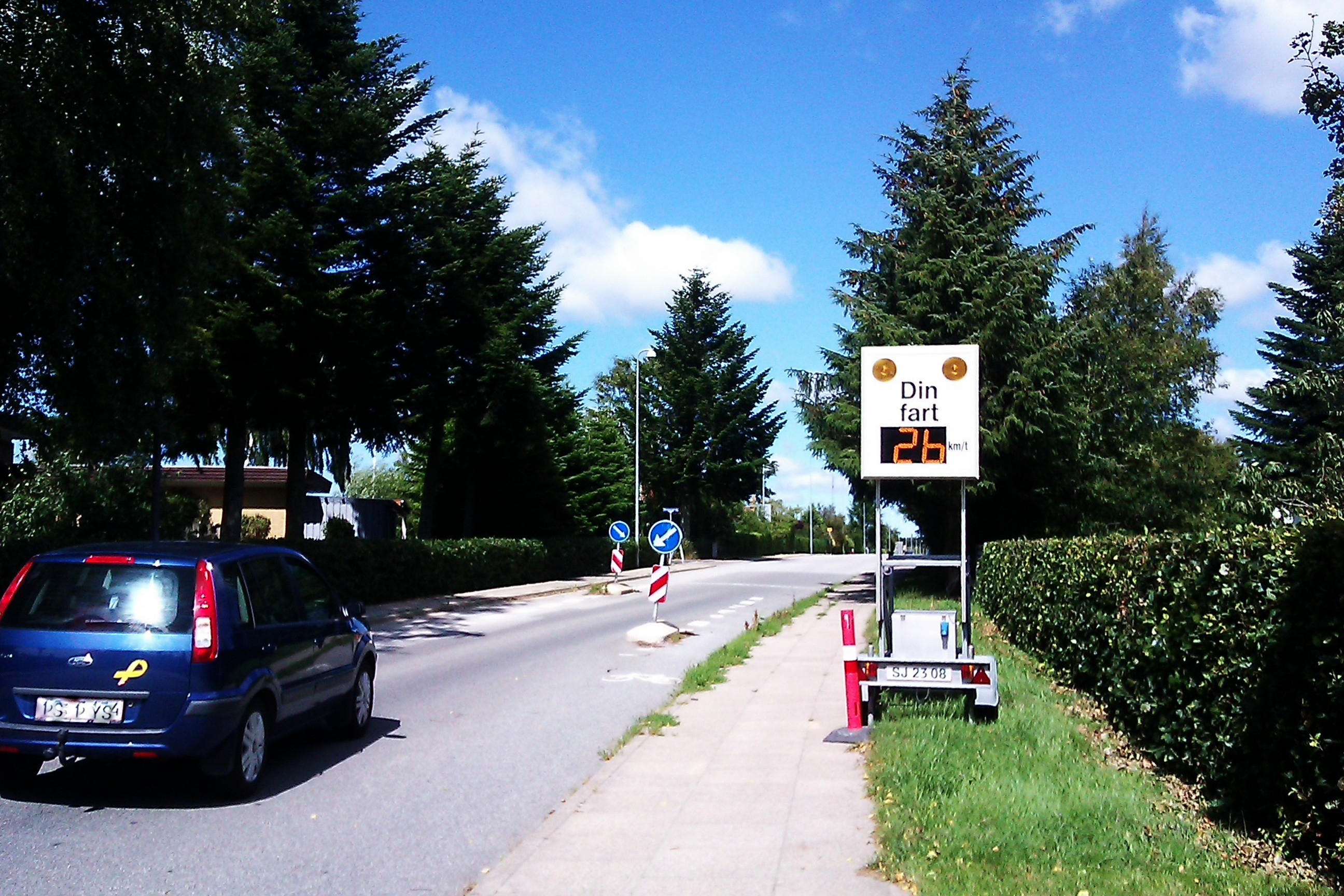
Automatic traffic speed measurement in Denmark

Denmark has the following general speed limits:

- 50 km/h within towns
- 80 km/h outside towns
- 80 km/h on expressways
- 130 km/h on motorways

A higher or a lower speed limit may be posted depending on the situation, but never more than 100 km/h on expressways and never more than 130 km/h on motorways

Some vehicles also have a general speed limit notwithstanding Article 42. These include;

Buses which have total permissible mass exceeding 3500 kg: 80 km/h; if the conditions laid down by ministry of Transport met, 100 km/h

Other vehicles which have total permissible mass exceeding 3500 kg "lorries": 80 km/h

Large mopeds: 45 km/h

Small mopeds: 30 km/h
