= A316 road =

Road in England

A316

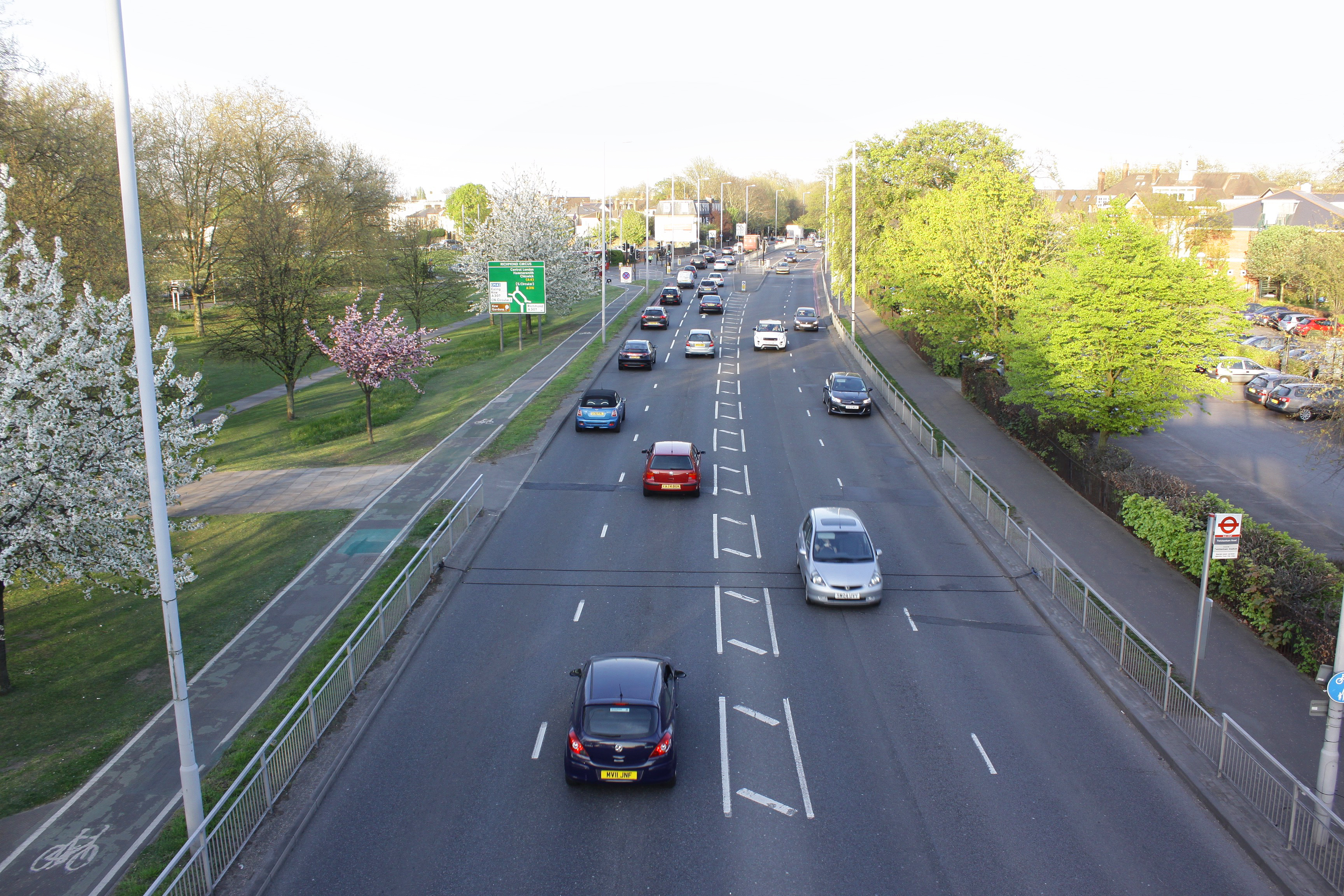
- The A316 road in Richmond（Twickenham Road）, near Old Deer Park.

Route information
- Length: 9.5 mi (15.3 km)

Major junctions
- East end: Chiswick
- A315; A4 A3003 A205 A307 A3004 A310 A305 A312 A314 A308; M3
- West end: Sunbury-on-Thames

Location
- Country: United Kingdom
- Primary destinations: Richmond; Twickenham

Road network
- Roads in the United Kingdom; Motorways; A and B road zones
| ← A315 | → A317 |

The A316 (known in parts as the Great Chertsey Road) is a major road in England, which runs from the A315 Chiswick High Road, Turnham Green, Chiswick to join head-on the M3 motorway at Sunbury-on-Thames. Its initial London section Chiswick Lane (to the Hogarth Roundabout) heads south – following this it is a mostly straight dual carriageway aligned WSW.

== Route ==
=== London Borough of Hounslow (east end) ===
Outward from London the road starts as Chiswick Lane at Chiswick, between 75 and 79 Chiswick High Road (51.493056°N 0.251667°W). Near the geographical centre of Chiswick it crosses the A4 at the Hogarth Roundabout, the connection for central London, the west of England, and South Wales. The road goes on past the grounds of Chiswick House as Burlington Lane, and then becomes Great Chertsey Road, passing Chiswick School. It then crosses the Thames on Chiswick Bridge.

=== London Borough of Richmond-upon-Thames ===
After Chiswick Bridge, the A316 is Clifford Avenue until its next crossroads, the South Circular Road (A205) and the A3003 to Mortlake and Barnes at Chalker's Corner. It becomes the dual-carriageway Lower Richmond Road before crossing the B353 at Manor Circus, North Sheen and then the single-carriageway Lower Mortlake Road before crossing the A307 at Richmond Circus. Finishing its bypass of Richmond to the north, it forms a long bend, as Twickenham Road, passing Pools on the Park and skirting most of Old Deer Park on the south side, before crossing the Thames again on Twickenham Bridge. After this the road is called The Avenue, and includes a sharp 35 degree correctional bend, before reaching St Margarets Roundabout, St Margarets, which is the junction for the short A3004 in both directions.

The long western section after this in the Borough is Chertsey Road. It passes the London Road (A310) Roundabout, before passing an unusually relocated and architecturally Grade I church, All Hallows (formerly Wren's All Hallows, Lombard Street). The road passes Whitton Road Roundabout, also in north Twickenham, which is the turning for Twickenham Rugby Stadium. The road then becomes dual-carriageway again and runs through south Whitton, passing The Stoop rugby ground and a prominent pub/hotel complex. After crossing the River Crane, the A316 leaves Richmond-upon-Thames and returns to Hounslow.

=== London Borough of Hounslow (west end) ===
Between Hospital Bridge Roundabout in Richmond-upon-Thames, and Apex Corner Roundabout, the road resumes the name Great Chertsey Road. After Apex Corner Roundabout, which the A316 crosses over by way of a flyover – most of the remainder of the road is called Country Way. The road crosses the Longford River while bisecting Hanworth. By the Kempton Park Reservoirs SSSI the A316 turns SSW with sliproads to the Nallhead Road Roundabout, and passes a Dairy Crest building: formerly Job's Dairy, the building later belonged to Unigate before being bought by Dairy Crest. The building has distinctive sculptures of cows made of fibreglass on the roof, installed in 1977, which replaced some earlier stone cow sculptures. The road passes the Kempton Park Steam Engines at the prominent waterworks, and then exits the London area.

=== Spelthorne ===
The final short section of the A316 is in Spelthorne, Surrey and is called Hanworth Road. The road enters the borough near Kempton Park Racecourse, before joining the motorway end-on at Sunbury Cross (Junction 1 of the M3) also in Sunbury-on-Thames. Slip roads link the road with the A308. (51.419444°N 0.418333°W). Just to the north of the road as it joins the M3 is the site of some former greyhound kennels, now occupied by warehouses.

== History ==
The greater part of the road was originally planned in the 1920s as a relief road linking London with South West England. Construction began in 1928 and the road, together with Chiswick and Twickenham Bridges, was opened in 1933. The section between Hanworth and Sunbury is part of an older route; before being widened and renamed Country Way in the 1970s, this section had the names Twickenham Road (between Apex Corner and Bear Road) and Sunbury Road (between Bear Road and Kempton Park). A pub once stood adjacent to the A316 in Hanworth called the "Brown Bear"; it was demolished in 1973 when the road was made into triple lanes and the flyover with limited access over the junction of Bear/Hanworth Road built.

The A316 was the first road in Britain to have stationary traffic enforcement cameras on it, when, on 13 October 1992, the first camera, a Gatso, near Twickenham Bridge facing the road westbound was turned on.

== Fatal incidents ==
Nicola Regan, who died after being run over in front of a group of friends on 22 March 1991, is commemorated by a nearby memorial bench in Old Deer Park.

On 6 October 1997, the A316 in Hanworth was the scene of one of the earliest recorded road rage incidents in Britain when Toby Exley, a chef from Teddington, and his partner Karen Martin, from Twickenham, both died when their car, a Ford Fiesta, collided with the central reserve after being hit by a speeding Vauxhall Senator which drove away. The driver of the Vauxhall Senator, Jason Humble, from Cove in Hampshire, was eventually arrested, found guilty at the Old Bailey on 2 April 1998 of manslaughter and sentenced to 12 years imprisonment.
