= Truvelo =

Truvelo may refer to:

- Truvelo Combi -a speed camera
- Truvelo Armoury - arms manufacturing division of Truvelo Specialised Manufacturing
