= Twickenham Bridge =

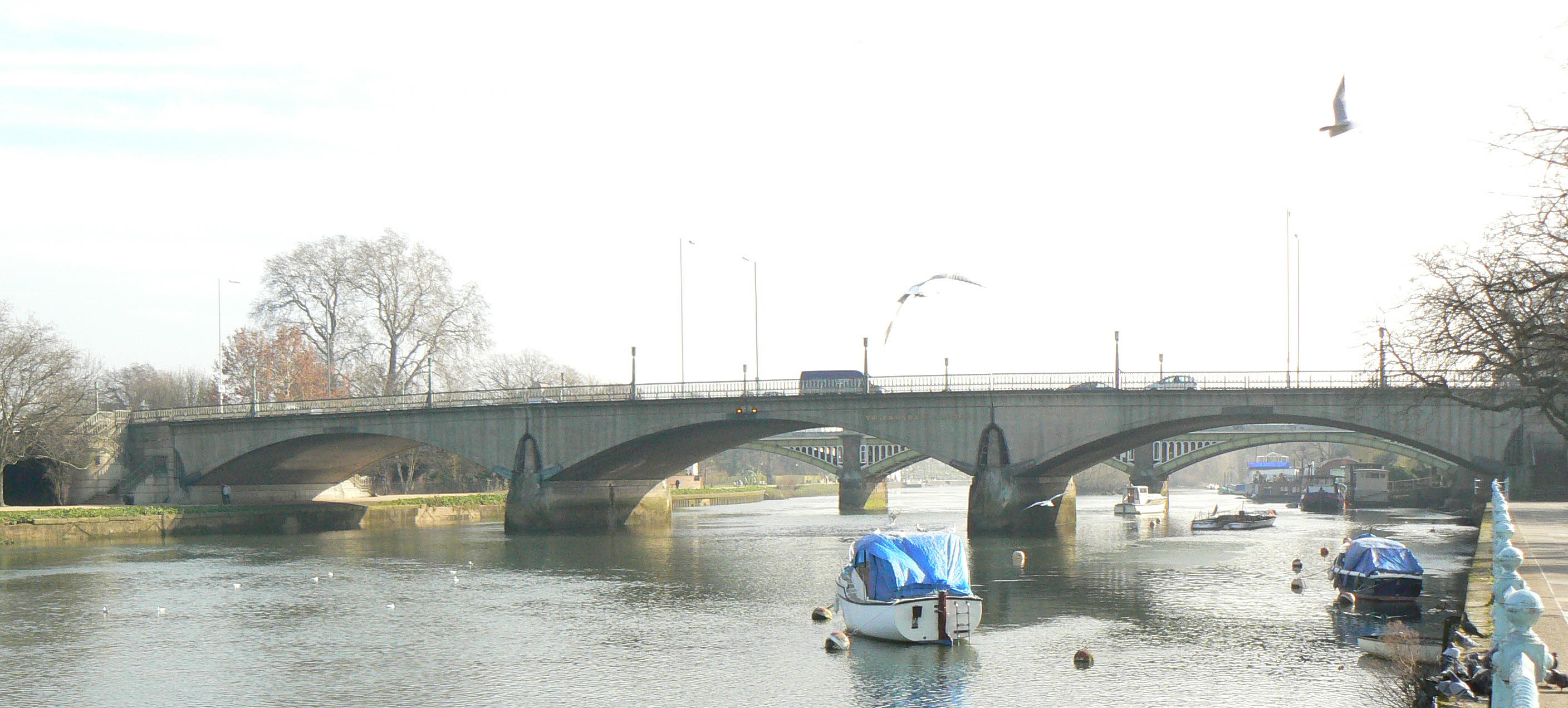
- Coordinates: 51°27′38″N 0°18′52″W
- Carries: A316 road
- Crosses: River Thames
- Locale: Richmond / St. Margarets
- Maintained by: Transport for London
- Heritage status: Grade II* listed structure

History
- Opened: 3 July 1933

Statistics

Listed Building – Grade II*
- Official name: Twickenham Bridge and attached railings, lamp standards and light brackets
- Designated: 25 May 1983
- Reference no.: 1253011

Location
- Interactive map of Twickenham Bridge

Twickenham Bridge crosses the River Thames in southwest London, England. Built in 1933 as part of the newly constructed "Chertsey Arterial Road", the bridge connects the Old Deer Park district of Richmond (historically Surrey) on the south bank of the river to St. Margarets (historically Middlesex) on the north bank, both within the London Borough of Richmond upon Thames. Twickenham Bridge gets its name from the fact that it is on the road to the town of Twickenham (also in the same London borough), which is approximately 3 km upstream from Twickenham Bridge, past Richmond Bridge. Given the bridge's unique position on the river, St Margarets is actually at the southwestern end of the bridge, despite being on the north bank, while Richmond, south of the Thames, is at the northeastern end of the bridge.

The bridge forms part of today's A316 (Chertsey Road), which links Central and West London with the M3 motorway at Sunbury-on-Thames.

The bridge's architect was Maxwell Ayrton and the head engineer was Alfred Dryland. The proposed design of the bridge envisaged four 70 foot towers to be constructed on the riverbanks with retaining walls of 20 feet above road level. The plans were widely opposed and a local petition was organised by The Daily Telegraph against the design on the grounds that it was inappropriate to the setting in Richmond.

The final design of the bridge was of three reinforced-concrete arches supported on concrete piers with Art Deco embellishments. The bridge incorporates three permanent hinges enabling the structure to adjust to changes in temperature, the first reinforced concrete bridge structure in the UK to use such an innovation. The arch springings, as well as the arch crowns, have decorative bronze cover plates. Ribbed shuttering was used in the casting of the concrete piers and abutments, giving the main faces a ribbed finish that was then knocked back. The approach viaduct and retaining walls were constructed in precast blocks that were wire brushed to create a rough finish. The balustrades and lamps were constructed of open bronzework. The Bromsgrove Guild was employed in casting and fitting the bronze lamp standards and parapets as well as the railings on the four staircases between road level and the river bank

The bridge, along with the newly built Chiswick Bridge and the rebuilt Hampton Court Bridge, was opened by Edward, Prince of Wales on 3 July 1933.

In 1992, the first Gatso speed camera in the United Kingdom was launched on Twickenham Bridge.

The bridge was declared a Grade II* listed structure in 2008, providing protection to preserve its special character from unsympathetic development.

== See also ==
- List of crossings of the River Thames
- List of bridges in London

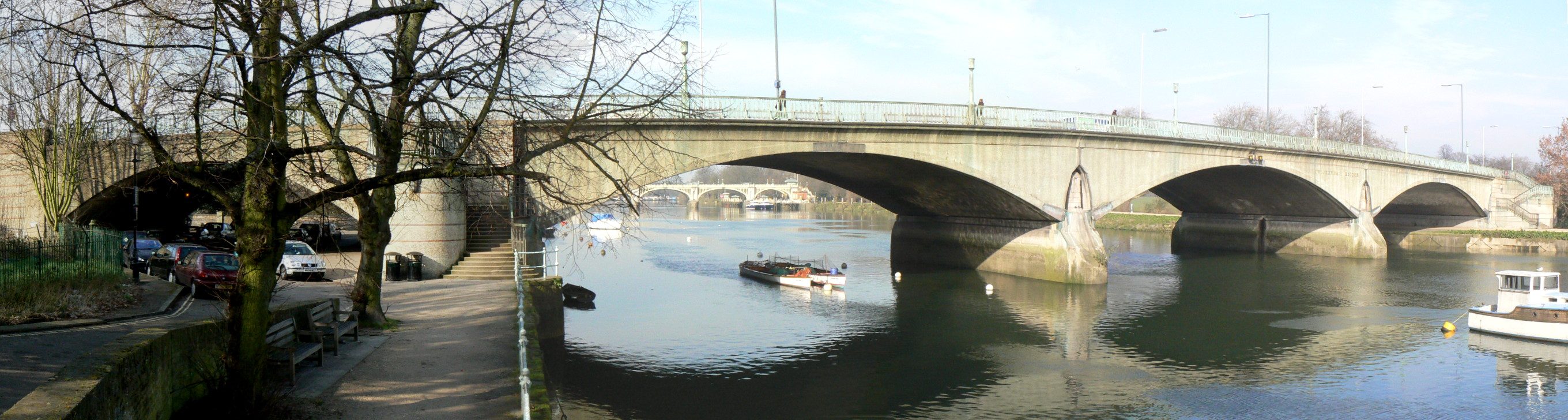
Twickenham Bridge – a panorama looking downstream
