= D-cam =

Type of digital speed camera

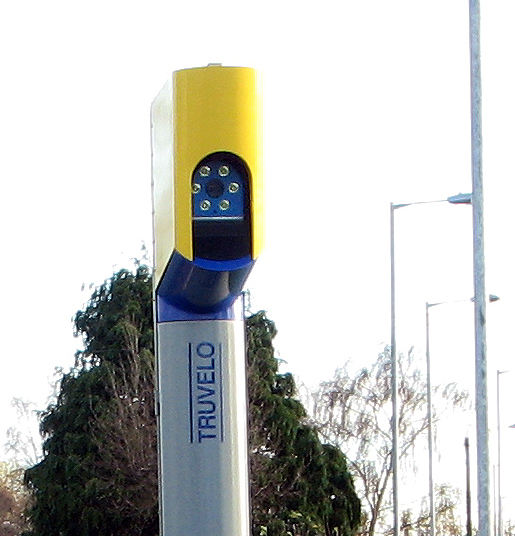
A Truvelo d-cam in operation in the UK

d-cam is a type of digital speed camera produced by the British subsidiary of the South African company Truvelo Manufacturers (Pty) Ltd. Testing by Transport for London commenced on the A4 Great West Road in London, in April 2007. The camera can be used rear or forward-facing. It was the first combined traffic light camera and speed camera to be used in the United Kingdom. The new style of camera housing was designed by Bristol-based firm Crown (UK) Ltd.

The equipment gained UK Home Office type approval early in 2014 and newly installed units started appearing shortly afterwards.

== See also ==
- Truvelo Combi
- Gatso
- Home Office Type Approval
