= Njection =

- Website type: Social network service
- Creators: Shannon Atkinson, Founder and CEO
- Website: www.njection.com (archived July 30, 2016)
- Launched: July 2007

Njection was a free, web-based resource for car and driving enthusiasts. According to The New York Times, the site (and the company) was the first to use the Bing Maps Platform to pinpoint speed traps and traffic accidents in the United States and parts of Europe. A privately held company founded in 2007, Njection.com LLC was headquartered in Las Vegas, Nevada. Njection.com was shut down in 2016; the site had not been updated since September 2011.

== Innovations ==
Njection was originally intended to provide a news and communication forum for car enthusiasts. When it became apparent that speed traps were a big focus in the forum, the Speedtrap feature was added. The Speedtrap Mashup was the first online site to use the Bing Maps Platform to allow users to contribute in real time the location of speed traps around the world.

In 2009, the Speedtrap mapping system was upgraded to allow users to add traffic accidents and fatalities and traffic flow and speed to the maps. The Speedtrap functionality relies on drivers to update the map; therefore, the functionality is dependent on the information provided by registered users.

In 2008, the company developed the Njection Mobile (NMobile) application for the iPhone. This application was the first non-Microsoft application to use the Bing Maps Platform and the Active Intelligence Selection System to provide access to speed trap information while driving. Although it was initially offered as a paid application, the NMobile application has been available as a free download since 2009. In 2008, the Microsoft-enabled application also became available as a downloadable file on Garmin GPS units. That functionality is no longer available through Garmin.
