= Pools on the Park =

Public bath in London, England

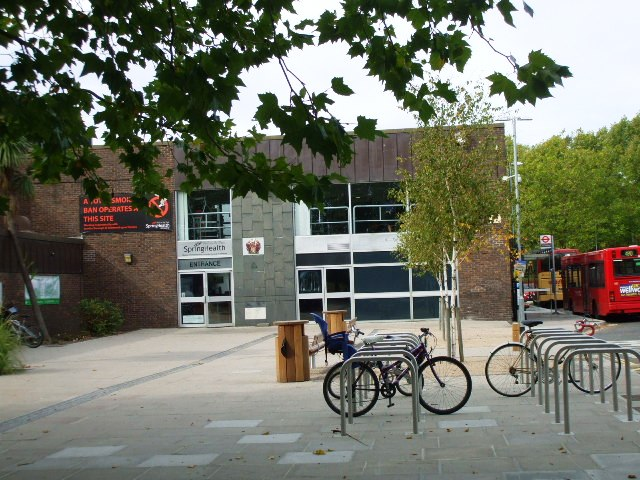
- Main entrance and forecourt
- Interactive map of Pools on the Park
- Former names: Richmond Baths
- Location: Pools on the Park, Old Deer Park, Richmond, TW9 2SF
- Coordinates: 51.4652°N 0.3059°W
- Owner: Richmond Council
- Operator: Richmond Council's Feel Good Fitness
- Type: heated indoor and outdoor
- Facilities: parking, cafe, gym, sauna, steamroom, extensive grounds
- Dimensions: Length: 33.3 metres (109 ft); Width: 13 metres (43 ft); Depth: 3.6 metres (12 ft)

Construction
- Opened: 1966; 60 years ago
- Architect: Leslie Gooday

Website
- www.richmond.gov.uk/pools_on_the_park_info.htm

Designations

Listed Building – Grade II
- Official name: Richmond Baths, Old Deer Park
- Designated: 16 January 1996
- Reference no.: 1246189

Pools on the Park (previously known as Richmond Baths) is a Grade II listed swimming pool and leisure facility in Old Deer Park in Richmond, London. Construction on the 6.5-acre (2.6 ha) site started in 1964 and was completed in 1966; the architect was Leslie Gooday. The pool replaced the previous Richmond baths nearby which had been built in Parkshot in 1882.

Pools on the Park is recognised by Historic England as illustrating "the more ambitious use of glazed curtain walling and the post-Wolfenden Report (Note: The Wolfenden Report referred to in this instance is that of the Committee on Sport & the Community, chaired by John Wolfenden, whose report, commissioned by the Central Council of Physical Recreation, reported in 1960.) emphasis on providing large banks of spectator seating".

The building, which includes 33.3-metre (109 ft) pool and a learner pool inside, and an open-air pool outside, received a Civic Trust award in 1967.

Richmond Council manages, directly, the pool and leisure facility. Pool on the Park has a long established physiotherapy and osteopathy clinic on site.

== Transport ==
Pools on the Park has its own pay and display car park and is the terminus for London Buses route 490 from Heathrow Terminal 5.
