= Old Deer Park =

Open space in Richmond, London

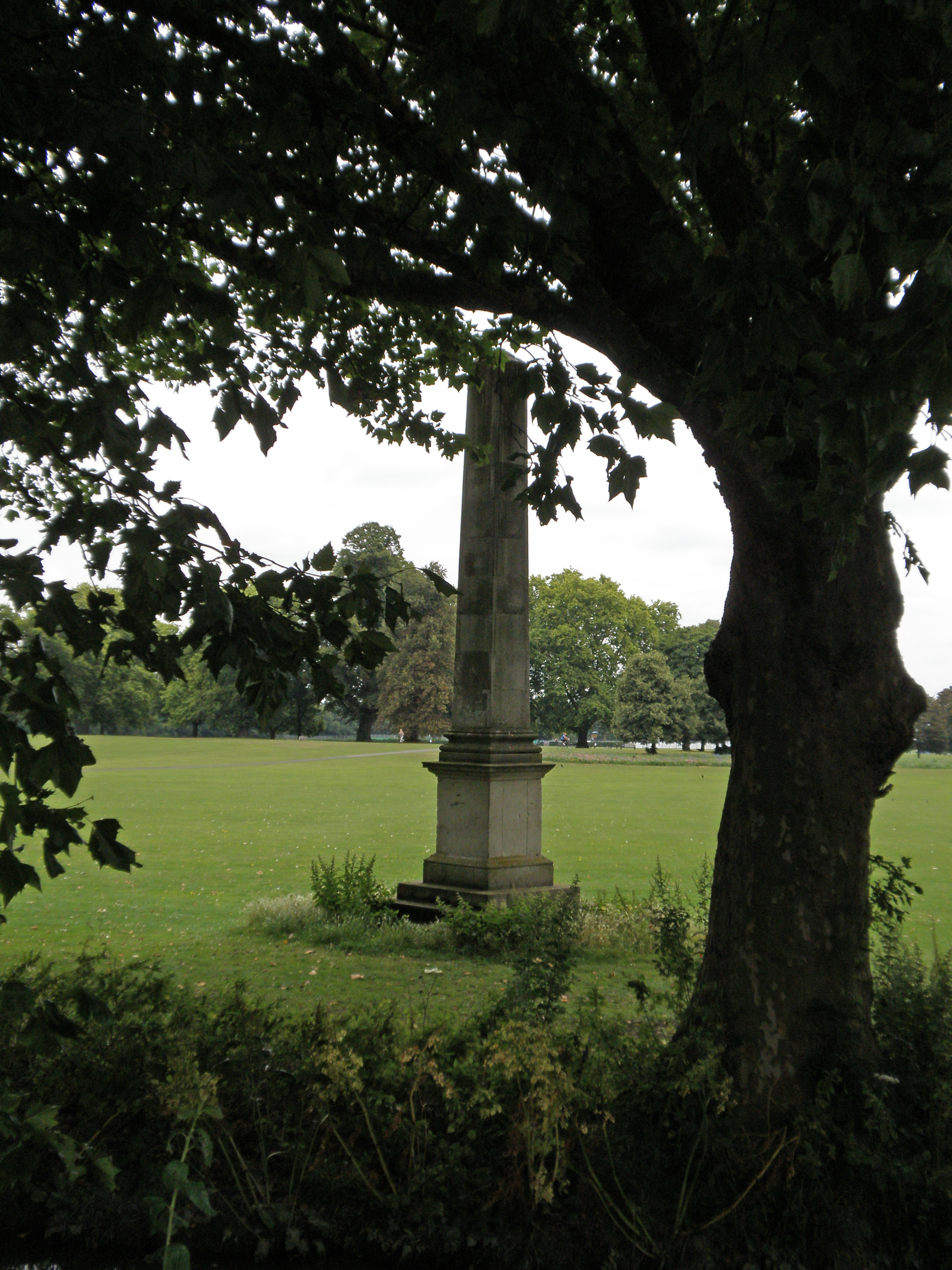
- One of the two obelisks facing the River Thames in Old Deer Park, used to align Kew Observatory telescopes

- Location within Greater London
- Type: public
- Location: Richmond, London
- Coordinates: 51°27′51.79″N 0°18′21.67″W
- Area: 147 hectares (360 acres)
- Created: 1603

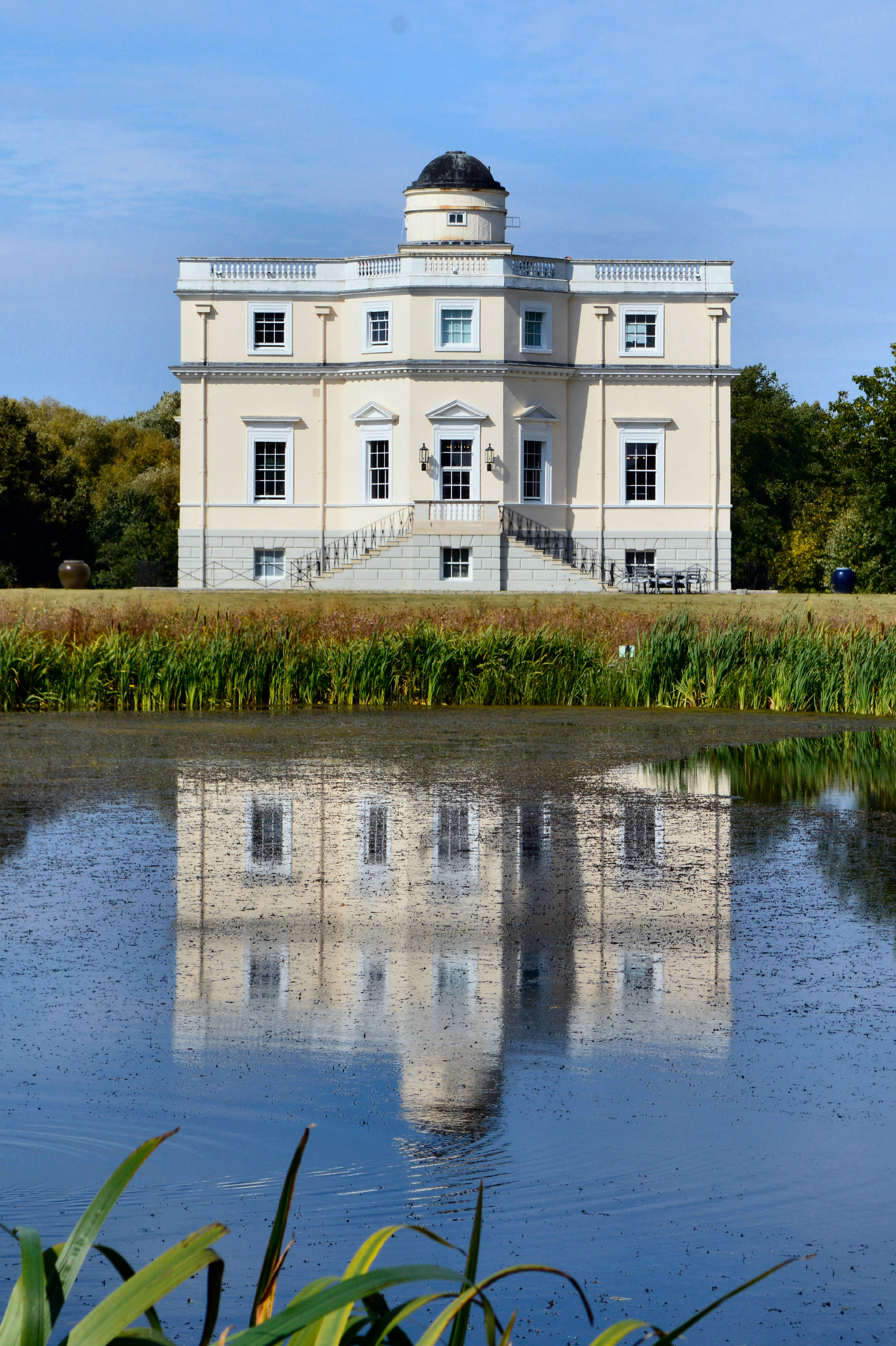
The King's Observatory (Kew Observatory) built in 1769, with the pond in foreground

The Old Deer Park is an area of open space within Richmond, owned by the Crown Estate, in the London Borough of Richmond upon Thames, England. It covers 147 hectares (360 acres) of which 90.4 hectares (220 acres) are leased as sports grounds for sports, particularly rugby, golf and cricket. Despite the name, there are now no deer in the park.

== Location ==
The park is bounded generally by the River Thames to the west, Kew Gardens to the north and, across a trunk road, urban areas of Richmond town to the east and south. Owned by the Crown Estate, the park forms part of a larger retained historic and biodiverse landscape incorporating part of Richmond, Kew and Isleworth. The lowest, western parts of the park constitute flood storage areas, which provide emergency flood relief around Richmond semi-tidally submerged Lock.

Old Deer Park's heritage as a historic royal landscape in a favoured riverside location has become compromised over recent decades by instances of inappropriate recreational and parking development, general neglect, and insufficient control of tree planting. A long-term strategy is now being implemented to arrest and reverse this decline.

== History ==
In the mid-16th century, Richmond Palace was a favourite residence of Queen Elizabeth I and in 1574 she granted "Our park of Isleworth otherwise called the Newe Parke of Richmonde" to Edward Bacon. This statement was made even though Isleworth parish and manor lay on the Middlesex bank opposite the Surrey bank of Richmond — the Abbey of Syon in Isleworth was tied to that of Sheen on the other respective bank, which had jointly for centuries owned the estate.

Queen Elizabeth died at Richmond in 1603. Later that year her successor, King James I of England, established a hunting park by adding monastic land to the existing park and creating an enlarged area of 370 acres (1.5 km^{2}). This then became known as The New Park of Richmond. The present name "Old Deer Park" was adopted after 1637 when James's son King Charles I established the much larger Richmond Park on the other side of the town. During the eighteenth century Richmond Lodge was located in the Park, which served as the summer home of George, Prince of Wales (the future George II) and his wife Princess Caroline following their dispute with his father George I.

The majority of the park is now occupied by the Royal Mid-Surrey Golf Club, and this has been so since 1892. Within the club's boundaries are two 18-hole courses, plus a separate area within which lies the Grade I listed King's Observatory, established by King George III in 1769. To the south-west of the Observatory, under the fairway of the 14th hole of the outer golf course, lie the foundations of the former Carthusian Sheen Priory, founded by Henry V in 1414.

Construction of the railway line westwards from Richmond Station in 1847/8 restricted the access from Richmond Green to Old Deer Park, except for one narrow bridge. Eighty-five years later a new arterial road (the "Great Chertsey Road"), complete with a high ramped approach to a new bridge over the Thames (Twickenham Bridge – built in 1933), was also constructed across the southern end of the park, close to and roughly parallel with the railway. This heightened the sense of separation between town and park – alleviating this problem is also part of the new strategy.

Beside the River Thames in the park are a pair of stone obelisks. They were built in 1769, and were originally installed to align telescopes used by the King's Observatory to observe the transit of Venus across the Sun that year.

The park was used to accommodate 5,000 of the 8,000 Scouts attending the 1st World Scout Jamboree in 1920. The public open spaces are occasionally used for circuses, funfairs and other events.

== Cricket ground ==
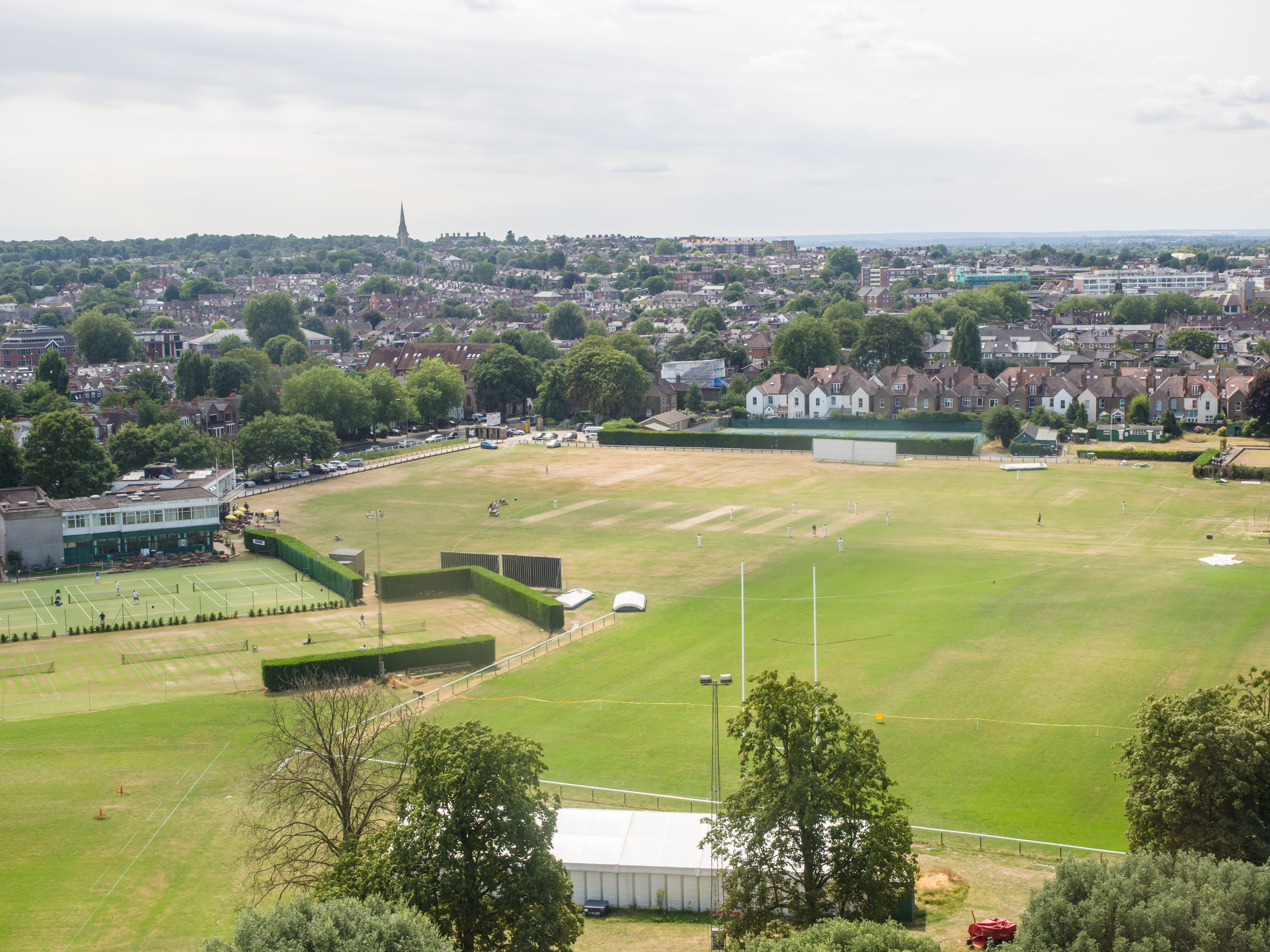
View of sports facilities at Old Deer Park

Old Deer Park has been used a venue for cricket since 1864 by Richmond Cricket Club (founded 1862), including for matches against international touring teams.

Despite historically being within Surrey, the cricket ground has held some home games of Middlesex County Cricket Club, including occasional List A and T20 Blast matches between 2000 and 2019.

== Rugby ground ==
The rugby ground at the Old Deer Park is the home of London Welsh Amateur RFC. It was previously the home of London Welsh RFC from 1957 to 2013 and from 2015 to 2017, when the professional London Welsh club was dissolved.

The rugby ground has a capacity of 5,850, with 1,000 seats.

== Main elements of the park ==
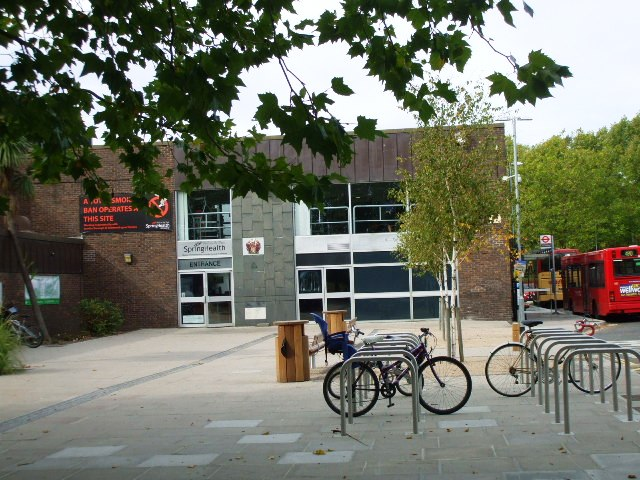
Main entrance and forecourt to Pools on the Park

Accessed from the A316:

- Informal sport area, with open recreation areas, football, rugby and other pitches
- Royal Mid-Surrey Golf Club courses
- King's Observatory
- Richmond Athletic Ground, home to Richmond rugby club
- Richmond Swimming Pool & Lido, now called Pools on the Park
- Public car park and miscellaneous commercial buildings

Accessed from the A307:

- Sports Ground with rugby, cricket, tennis, archery and bowls
