= Maus Gatsonides =

Dutch rally driver and inventor

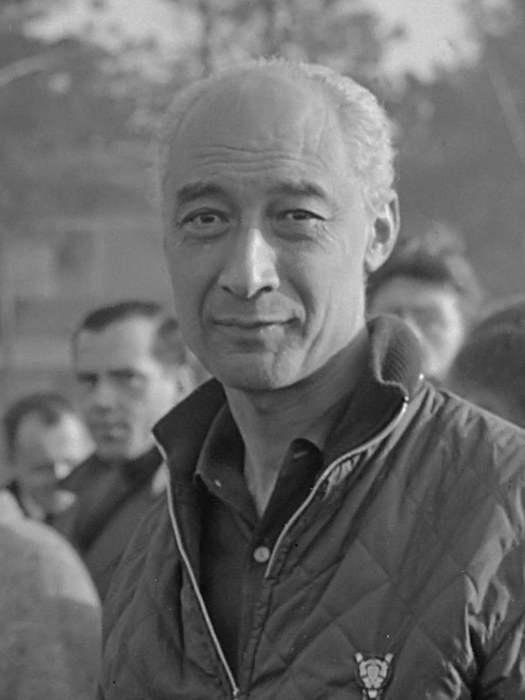
Maus Gatsonides (1964)

Maurice "Maus" Gatsonides (February 14, 1911 in Gombong, Kebumen Regency – November 29, 1998 in Heemstede) was a Dutch rally driver and inventor. Gatsonides was born in Central Java in the former Dutch East Indies (now Indonesia). He founded the company "Gatsometer BV" in the Netherlands in 1958.

Today, Gatsonides' fame largely results from inventing the Gatso speed camera, a speed measuring device used today by many police forces to catch speeding drivers. He originally invented the Gatso speed camera to measure his cornering speed in an attempt to improve his driving.

== Motor racing ==
Gatsonides is primarily known for inventing the speed camera, but his primary interest was in motor racing.

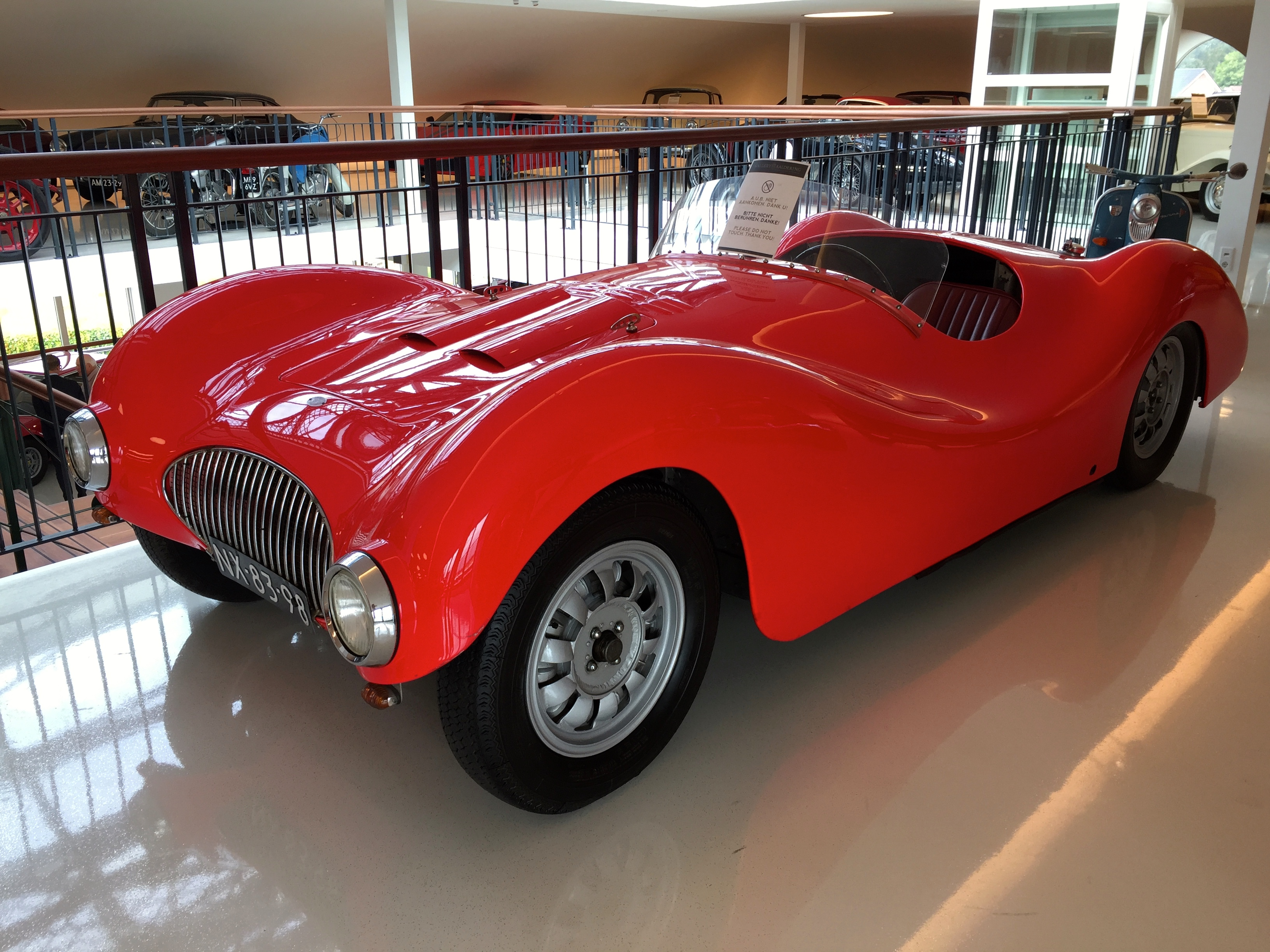
Gatso 1500 Sport, aka "Platje", 1948

Maurice was passionate about racing and raced in many events.

In 1949, he built his own car. It was nicknamed the "Platje" (English: "Little Flat One or Pubic Lice (Pthirus pubis)") because of its aerodynamic shape. The car caused a sensation at the Dutch Zandvoort Racetrack, passing all of the opponents including MG's. Maurice was forced to sell the Flatty to pay creditors after trying to put his own V8 sportscar into production. The Flatty however, survived. It was found abandoned in the 1970s and has now been restored by Joop Bruggeman. It is the last-known surviving Gatso car.

Gatsonides won the Monte Carlo Rally in 1953 driving a Ford Zephyr.
