= Truvelo Combi =

Speed camera

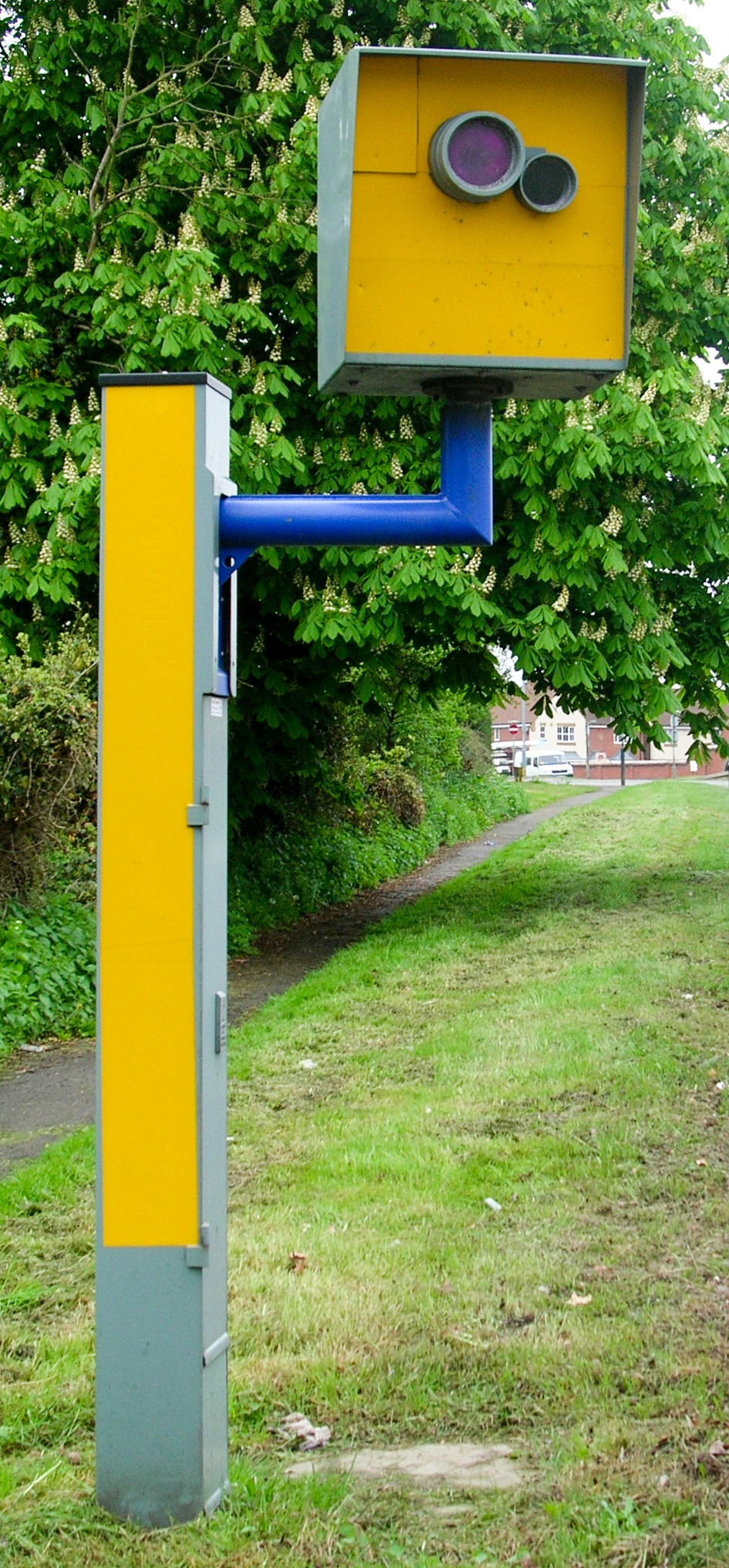
'Truvelo Combi' speed camera

Truvelo Combi is a speed camera manufactured by the South African company Truvelo Manufacturers (Pty) Ltd. It was approved in 1999.

== Background ==
The Truvelo camera is usually a front-facing camera (it can also be rear-facing) taking pictures using a flash gun fitted with a magenta filter (the driver is less likely to be dazzled by the flash light). The reflected light provides the film with the correct exposure resulting in a clear picture of the driver committing the offence (considered as incriminating evidence).

Piezo-electric road strips, a known distance apart (1.53 cm from 1 - 3, 2 - 4) are set into the road in front of the camera, and the time between compressions is measured using an impededance converter and two clocks in the camera to give the resulting speed of the vehicle. The system takes a single photograph (front-facing only, two for rear photography) and uses the time from the clocks to calculate the resulting speed. The photograph of the offending vehicle will show its front tyres on the three narrowly spaced white lines across the carriageway (known as a Secondary Speed Check Lines), the middle line is 1.8 m from the last sensor, the first and third are 18 cm either side of the middle line = 10% which are present at all Truvelo installations. This is to identify the offending vehicle when it is travelling alongside a non-offending one.

For front-facing photography there are two sets of Piezo sensors that are linked as 1 - 3 and 2 - 4 in the road for Truvelo camera, both taking independent readings, if the two do not match (±2 mph) the offence is discarded.

== Photographic evidence ==
In the United Kingdom, the single incriminating photograph will not be sent unless the car owner asks for it – a Home Office ruling aimed at avoiding embarrassing situations if a driver is photographed with someone they would prefer not to be seen with. Not all Safety Camera Partnerships will disclose picture evidence. Some will only issue copies of the original photos once a summons for court has been issued, and there is a need to comply with disclosure rules.

== See also ==
- d-cam
- Gatso
- Safety Camera Partnership
- SPECS (speed camera)
