= List of selfie-related injuries and deaths =

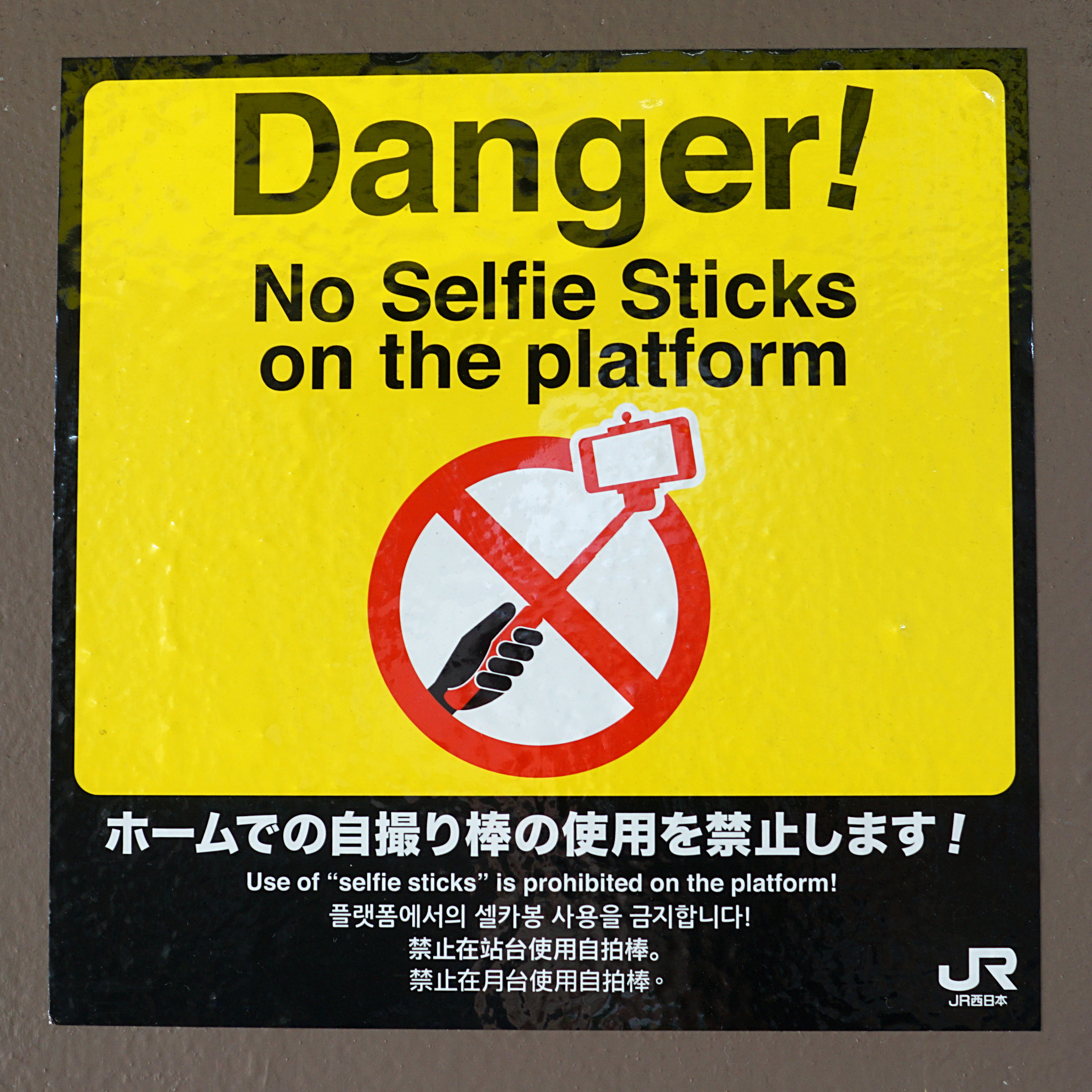
"Danger! No Selfie Sticks on the platform" sign at a West Japan Railway Company station

This is a list of serious injuries and deaths in which one or more subjects of a selfie were killed or injured before, during, or after taking a photo of themselves, with the accident at least in part attributed to taking the photo.

== Overview ==
The United States Department of Transportation estimated that in 2014, the so-called "year of the selfie", 33,000 people were injured while driving and using a cell-phone in some fashion, which can include talking, listening, and "manual button/control actuation". A 2015 survey by Erie Insurance Group found that 4% of all drivers admitted to taking selfies while driving.

The Washington Post reported in January 2016 that "about half" of at least 27 "selfie related" deaths in 2015 had occurred in India. There is no official data on the number of people who died taking selfies in India, but reports show from 2014 to August 2016 that there have been at least 54 deaths in India while taking selfies. The Indian Ministry of Tourism asked states to identify and barricade "selfie danger" areas, its first national attempt to deal with the selfie deaths. Mumbai Police identified at least 16 danger zones after a man drowned attempting to save a selfie-taker. No-selfie zones were also established in certain areas of the Kumbh Mela because organizers feared that bottlenecks caused by selfie-takers could spark stampedes.

A 2018 study of news reports showed that there were 259 selfie deaths in 137 incidents reported globally between October 2011 and November 2017, with the highest occurrences in India, followed by Russia, United States, and Pakistan. The mean age was 23 years old, with male deaths outnumbering female about three to one.

From January 2008 to July 2021 it was estimated that there were 379 people who died in selfie related accidents.

== Injuries and deaths ==
Date	Country	Deaths	Injuries	Type	Description	Ref.
15 October 2011	United States	3	0	Transport	Three teenagers (two sisters, 15 and 13, and a friend, aged 15) were killed by a Union Pacific train while posing for a selfie that was found on their phone near Salt Lake City. Shortly before, they posted the message "Standing right by a train ahaha this is awsome!!!!" to Facebook.	
March 2014	Spain	1	1	Electrocution	A 21-year-old man was electrocuted and another person hospitalized in a serious condition after climbing on top of a train to take a selfie with friends and touching a live electric wire.	
March 2014	Russia	1	0	Transport	Two people were walking near train tracks when a train approached them; one of the people on the tracks moved away, and the second person, a 15-year-old, was attempting to take a selfie when she was struck by the train and was killed.	
April 2014	United States	1	0	Transport	A 32-year-old woman from North Carolina died after her vehicle crossed the center median on Interstate 85 in the Greensboro–Winston-Salem area, upon which it collided with a recycling truck, left the road, hit a tree, and burst into flames – moments after posting selfies online when she heard Pharrell Williams's song "Happy" playing on radio station WKZL inside her car. The truck driver was reportedly unharmed after the fatal crash.	
2 April 2014	Mexico	1	0	Other	Two 16-year-old girls posed for naked selfies in private. One girl later posted the revealing photos online. The other girl was so enraged she stabbed her friend to death in an ambush attack.	
22 April 2014	Russia	1	0	Fall	A 17-year-old girl fell 30 feet (9.1 m) to her death after being hit by 1,500 volts when attempting to grab live wires on a railway bridge.	
May 2014	India	1	0	Transport	A 15-year-old boy was killed by a train while posing for a selfie on the tracks.	
31 May 2014	United States	2	0	Transport	A 29-year-old amateur pilot allegedly took selfies using a GoPro camera before his plane crashed in a grassy field in Colorado, killing himself and the passenger on board.	
June 2014	Italy	1	0	Fall	A 16-year-old girl died in Taranto after plunging 60 feet (18 m) onto rocks while she was trying to take a selfie on the seafront.	
July 2014	Philippines	1	0	Fall	A 14-year-old high school student fell to her death after losing her balance while taking a selfie with a friend near a staircase landing of their school in Pasig. She sustained a sharp blow to the head from the fall and broke a rib, which pierced a kidney.	
April 2014	Peru	0	1	Transport	A 22-year-old Canadian tourist standing too close to railway tracks while recording a selfie video was accidentally kicked in the head by a conductor riding on the front of a passing train. The recording of the incident quickly became a viral video.	
24 July 2014	Belgium	1	0	Transport	A 12-year-old was with a second person taking selfies near a railway track. A train arrived and they went back down onto the tracks to retrieve their bags. As they were waiting for the train to leave, a second train approached that they did not hear. The second person jumped away before the train collided with them, but the 12-year-old was hit by the train and killed.	
August 2014	Philippines	0	1	Firearm	A 15-year-old boy was critically wounded after accidentally shooting himself while taking a selfie in which his other hand was holding a gun to his chin.	
2 August 2014	Mexico	1	0	Firearm	A 21-year-old man was drinking with friends and took a selfie to post on Facebook. He posed with a gun pointed at his face. The man accidentally shot himself and was declared dead at the scene.	
August 2014	Portugal	2	0	Fall	A Polish couple fell to their death off a cliff after crossing a safety barrier to take a selfie with their two children, who survived.	
August 2014	India	1	0	Electrocution	In Kerala, a 14-year-old boy was electrocuted while attempting to take a selfie on top of a stationary train.	
August 2014	United States	1	0	Transport	A 36-year-old man from Niagara, North Dakota, struck and killed a 54-year-old woman while driving. She was riding a bicycle and he was distracted as he took a selfie, striking her from behind with his vehicle.	
12 October 2014	Philippines	1	0	Drowned	An 18-year-old woman was posing for a group selfie on a beach with friends when she was caught by a strong wave and drowned.	
November 2014	Spain	1	0	Fall	A 23-year-old Polish student fell to her death while trying to take a selfie on the ledge of the Triana Bridge in Seville.	
January 2015	South Africa	1	0	Fall	A 21-year-old woman died after falling from Northcliff Hill, Johannesburg, as a male companion was setting up a tripod for a selfie.	
January 2015	Russia	2	0	Other	Two young men died in the Ural Mountains after they pulled the pin from a live hand grenade to take a selfie. The phone with the picture remained as evidence of the incident.	
January 2015	India	3	0	Transport	Three students aged 20 to 22 died trying to take a "daredevil selfie" close to an oncoming train on railway tracks in Mathura.	
4 February 2015	India	1	0	Transport	A 24-year-old Israeli man traveling on a train from Mumbai to Goa was attempting to take a selfie and fell out of the moving train, resulting in his death.	
21 February 2015	United States	1	0	Transport	A man in Kalama, Washington, stepped out onto a railroad track to take a selfie with himself and a woman with a passing Amtrak train in the background. The man misjudged which track the oncoming train was on, and was struck and killed at the scene.	
March 2015	India	7	0	Drowned	Seven people drowned while taking selfies on Mangrul Lake near Kuhi, about 20 km from Nagpur. Their boat had tipped over as they were standing up to pose.	
1 April 2015	Italy	1	0	Fall	A 60-year-old German tourist skiing in the Trentino-Alto Adige region was reported missing when he failed to pick up his children from ski school. Subsequent investigation found that while skiing alone, he took off his skis and went off-trail to take a selfie next to a cliff, where he slipped and plunged approximately 660 feet (200 m) to his death.	
April 2015	Serbia	1	0	Transport	A 22-year-old man was trying to recreate a scene from his favorite movie Barking at the Stars by running in front of a train, beating it and being hailed a hero. As he ran in front of the train, he tried to take a selfie to document the scene. He was killed instantly when the express train hit him at full speed in the village of Laćarak near the town of Sremska Mitrovica.	
May 2015	Romania	1	1	Electrocution	An 18-year-old woman died when she attempted to take the "ultimate selfie", posing with a friend on top of a train in Iași when her leg touched a live wire above which electrocuted her with 27,000 volts. Her 17-year-old companion was hospitalised.	
May 2015	Russia	1	0	Electrocution	A teenage boy climbed on a railway bridge in Ryazan Oblast to take a selfie and died when he came in contact with live wires.	
May 2015	Russia	0	1	Firearm	A 21-year-old woman found a 9-millimeter rubber-bullet pistol left by a security guard at her office, used it for taking a selfie, and accidentally shot herself in the head, sustaining severe injuries.	
May 2015	Indonesia	1	0	Fall	A 21-year-old man fell into the crater of Mount Merapi while attempting to take a selfie and died.	
May 2015	Indonesia	1	0	Fall	A Singaporean tourist died after falling into the sea while taking a selfie on a cliff in Nusa Lembongan, off the coast of Bali.	
June 2015	Pakistan	1	0	Firearm, shot by police	A 15-year-old boy was taking selfies with a toy gun when police opened fire on him, killing him.	
June 2015	Russia	0	2	Electrocution	Two teenage girls received electric shocks, but survived, at a railroad yard in Taganrog. They tried to climb on the tank car of an old freight train that was standing at the platform in order to take a selfie, but did not realize it was still in use and on a live track.	
June 2015	Croatia	1	0	Fall	A 54-year-old Slovak tourist visiting Plitvice Lakes National Park fell to her death from a rock while taking a selfie.	
4 July 2015	Wales	1	0	Electrocution	A walker in the Brecon Beacons was struck by lightning when the selfie stick he was using to capture a photograph acted like a lightning rod, causing death by electrocution.	
July 2015	Russia	1	0	Fall	A 21-year-old university graduate died after falling from a bridge while she was trying to take a selfie next to the Moscow International Business Center.	
July 2015	United States	0	1	Animal	A man from San Diego was hospitalised for five days following an attempt to take a selfie with a rattlesnake which then bit him.	
July 2015	United States	0	1	Animal	A woman in Yellowstone National Park was gored by an American bison while taking a selfie. She was treated for injuries.	
July 2015	Philippines	1	0	Transport	A woman vacationing in Pagudpud was hit by a motorcycle while taking a selfie by the side of a scenic road. She was taken to hospital and died.	
9 August 2015	Spain	1	0	Animal	A man was gored to death in the annual bull-running festival in Villaseca de la Sagra while trying to take a selfie with a bull.	
August 2015	China	1	0	Fall	A man was discovered with his phone and selfie stick at the bottom of a 100-foot cliff at Long Men waterfall in Zhejiang. Based on photographic evidence on his phone, police speculated that he lost his footing while taking a selfie and fell to his death. It was not known when he died or how long his body had been there.	
August 2015	Russia	1	0	Electrocution	A 14-year-old girl died after being electrocuted with a live wire when trying to take a selfie on a train.	
September 2015	United States	1	0	Firearm	A 19-year-old from Houston died after trying to take an Instagram selfie while holding a loaded gun to his head. He accidentally fired the gun and shot himself in the throat.	
September 2015	India	1	0	Fall	A Japanese tourist fell off a staircase to his death while taking a selfie at the Taj Mahal.	
September 2015	Russia	1	0	Fall	17-year-old student Andrey Retrovsky from Vologda died attempting to take a selfie while hanging from a rope from a nine-story building. The rope snapped. Retrovsky was known for taking 'extreme' selfies and posting them to his Instagram account drewsssik.	
September 2015	India	1	0	Fall	An engineering student died while taking selfies with friends at Kolli Hills, Namakkal, Tamil Nadu, when the rock on which he was standing cracked and gave way, plunging him 60 feet (18 m) and causing his death from head injuries.	
October 2015	Spain	0	1	Electrocution	A 14-year-old from Barcelona was hospitalised with electric shock after trying to take a selfie on the roof of a train car.	
October 2015	Chile	1	0	Other	A 68-year-old Belgian woman was visiting the El Tatio geyser field located within the Andes Mountains of Norte Grande. While attempting to take a selfie in front of an active geyser she stepped backwards and fell into the scalding hot water. Her husband pulled her out, but she died in hospital days later from burns over 85 percent of her body.	
November 2015	India	2	0	Drowned	Two engineering students of Wadhwan, Gujarat, drowned in the Narmada Canal after slipping down the bank while taking selfies.	
November 2015	India	1	1	Transport	A first-year college student Sourav Dey died and another was critically injured in the Kalyani area in Nadia district, West Bengal after they were run over by a train while they were taking selfies.	
November 2015	India	1	0	Electrocution	A 14-year-old boy, who was trying to take a selfie atop a stationary train wagon at Nahur station yard in Mumbai, was electrocuted and died a few hours later. He accidentally came in contact with a 25,000-volt overhead wire and suffered 80 percent burns.	
December 2015	Pakistan	1	0	Transport	A 22-year-old man in Rawalpindi died while attempting to take a selfie on a track in front of a moving train.	
December 2015	Turkey	2	3	Transport	Five intoxicated teenagers laid down in the middle of the road near an airport to take a selfie with a plane landing in the background. It was at night, and a truck driver did not see them and accidentally ran them over, killing two of them.	
1 January 2016	India	1	0	Transport	A 16-year-old boy was killed by a passenger train while taking a selfie with an approaching train in Chennai. The teen reportedly walked in front of the train and waited for it to come closer before taking the photo.	
5 January 2016	Philippines	1	0	Fall	A 19-year-old student fell to her death from the top of a 20-story apartment building in Manila while taking a selfie. According to her classmate, "she was not satisfied with the photos they had taken so she decided to climb up the parapet wall".	
7 January 2016	Brazil	1	0	Fall	A 27-year-old man fell into the sea and died after an attempt to take a selfie on the rocks of Cantão do Indaiá in Bertioga, on the coast of São Paulo.	
9 January 2016	India	1	0	Fall	A 20-year-old fell to his death while taking a selfie from the top of the Reasi Fort at Jammu and Kashmir.	
9 January 2016	India	2	0	Drowned	A 20-year-old college student drowned at Bandstand Promenade in Bandra, Mumbai. She is believed to have been swept away in the high tide. According to the woman's friends, they were taking selfies while standing on the rock, close to the Bandra–Worli Sea Link (BWSL). "The girls were standing 50 metres away from the shore when the water suddenly rose. They did not notice the water rising, and remained on the rock taking pictures (selfies). One of the girls was pulled into the water due to high tide." A man also drowned after going into the water to rescue the girl.	
12 February 2016	India	3	0	Drowned	Three students of Mandya Institute of Medical Sciences drowned after falling in an irrigation canal in Hulivana village, 180 km from Bengaluru, reportedly while they were taking selfies.	
13 February 2016	India	2	0	Drowned	An 18-year-old college student drowned after falling off of the Waldevi Dam in Nashik, while taking a selfie. His 18-year-old friend jumped into the water in an attempt to save him, but also drowned.	
22 February 2016	India	0	5	Fall	Five people in Anjuna, Goa, fell off a cliff and were injured after a gate they were leaning on collapsed during a group selfie.	
29 February 2016	Nepal	1	0	Drowned	A Nepalese woman drowned in the Narayani River. She dived into the river to save her friend who slipped into the water while the two were taking selfies together near the bank. The woman who originally fell was rescued, but her friend who tried to save her drowned.	
2 March 2016	United States	1	0	Firearm	A 43-year-old man in Concrete, Washington, accidentally shot himself in the face with a gun and died while taking a selfie. He was unaware that the gun was loaded.	
5 March 2016	Australia	1	0	Firearm	A 22-year-old from Melbourne was shot in the face with a sawn-off shotgun while posing for a selfie with the gun. The gun was fired by a friend who was holding it. The shooter fled the scene and was charged with murder.	
12 March 2016	Hong Kong	1	0	Fall	A 30-year-old man fell off Lion Rock while taking a selfie and died.	
5 April 2016	India	1	0	Fall	A 16-year-old climbed a rock fountain at a zoo in Hyderabad, apparently to take a selfie. He slipped and fell into the water, and may have hit his head on a rock. He was taken to hospital where he was pronounced dead.	
15 April 2016	India	2	0	Transport	Two youths were run over by a train while taking selfies on the railway tracks at Purusottampur railway crossing in the Chunar area in Mirzapur district, Uttar Pradesh.	
16 April 2016	Brazil	0	1	Fall	A 27-year-old woman fell from a height of 35m at a waterfall in the Ibitipoca State Park in Minas Gerais. She was rescued by the fire department and survived.	
16 April 2016	India	1	0	Transport	A 16-year-old boy died while taking a selfie at a railway crossing in Saharanpur, Uttar Pradesh.	
21 April 2016	Brazil	1	0	Fall	In Campos dos Goytacazes, Rio de Janeiro, a 32-year-old woman died after she fell in a waterfall while attempting a selfie.	
26 April 2016	India	1	0	Fall	While taking a selfie, a 25-year-old fell off the Dolphin Nose cliff near Vattakanal village, 8 km from the Kodaikanal Lake, Tamil Nadu.	
1 May 2016	India	1	0	Firearm	A 15-year-old boy from Pathankot died after he accidentally shot himself with his father's revolver while taking a selfie with the gun pointed at his head.	
May 2016	China	2	0	Animal	A businessman at a wildlife park in Rongcheng, Shandong, was drowned by a walrus after taking several selfies and videos with the animal. A zookeeper was also drowned in the same incident after attempting to save the man.	
3 June 2016	India	1	0	Drowned	An 18-year-old boy drowned in the Ganges river while taking a selfie after bathing with his mother and a friend in Nabadwip, West Bengal.	
3 June 2016	United States	1	0	Firearm	A 15-year-old from Overland, Missouri, accidentally shot and killed himself while attempting to take a selfie at home posing with his father's gun.	
12 June 2016	India	2	0	Drowned	A 23-year-old fell into the water and drowned at Sindhrot Check Dam near Vadodara while taking a selfie. His friend jumped into the water to save him, but he also drowned.	
18 June 2016	United States	1	0	Fall	A 37-year-old EMS lieutenant of the New York City Fire Department was mountain climbing near Lake George in the Adirondack Mountains and was on a ledge at the top of Roaring Brook Falls preparing to take a selfie when she disappeared from sight. Rescue services found her body in the water at the base of the falls.	
22 June 2016	India	7	0	Drowned	Seven people aged 16 to 31 were swept away and drowned while taking a selfie in the river Ganges in Kanpur, Uttar Pradesh. According to police, they had gone for a picnic at Kanpur Ganges Barrage when one of the party tried to take a selfie by standing on the edge of the barrage and tripped and fell into the river, which was already in spate due to rains. The six others, in an attempt to save him, jumped into the river but were themselves swept away by the current.	
22 June 2016	India	1	0	Fall	A third year engineering student of a Lonavala-based college lost his balance while taking a selfie from the Amrutanjan Bridge and fell down next to the Mumbai Pune Expressway in Maharashtra. He died on the spot.	
29 June 2016	Peru	1	0	Fall	A 28-year-old South Korean tourist plunged 1,600 feet (490 m) off a cliff at the Gocta Cataracts in the Amazonas Region while attempting to take a picture of himself. Divers and mountain rescue teams were brought in to recover the body submerged more than 20 feet (6.1 m) underwater at the base of the falls.	
29 June 2016	Peru	1	0	Fall	A 51-year-old German tourist visiting Machu Picchu fell 130 feet (40 m) to his death after he lost his footing while leaping into the air for a "flying selfie".	
1 July 2016	Croatia	0	1	Fall	A 20-year-old Canadian tourist fell off a viewpoint 75 meters (246 ft) high in the Plitvice Lakes National Park while trying to take a selfie. His fall was broken by tree branches and he survived with injuries.	
2 July 2016	India	1	0	Fall	A 32-year-old died after he fell in a 150 feet (46 m) deep gorge while taking a selfie near Chunakhaal on Dehradun-Mussoorie road in Uttarakhand.	
6 July 2016	India	4	0	Drowned	Four students were taking selfies near Purva waterfall on Tamsa River in Rewa district, Madhya Pradesh. They were unaware of an oncoming flash flood, and all four were swept away and drowned.	
12 July 2016	India	1	0	Fall	A 36-year-old and a friend climbed to a mountain peak at Khandala against warnings. There they took selfies with a waterfall in the background, but the 36-year-old slipped and fell into a 200-foot-deep quarry and died.	
12 July 2016	Nepal	1	0	Animal	A truck driver stopped for a herd of 21 wild elephants crossing the road. The driver exited his vehicle to take a selfie with the animals when the herd attacked and killed him.	
13 July 2016	India	2	0	Drowned	Two students drowned while taking selfies at Kosi Dam near Rampur, Uttar Pradesh. A group of students were taking selfies and became trapped in a vortex; the rest were saved.	
13 July 2016	Vietnam	2	0	Transport	In Hung Yen, two men aged 21 and 28 were hit and killed by a train while taking a selfie on the tracks. Bystanders attempted to warn the two men, but they could not hear them due to wearing earphones.	
17 July 2016	India	2	0	Drowned	A married couple ages 40 and 42 were swept away by a "giant wave" in Kanyakumari while they were taking a selfie.	
19 July 2016	India	2	0	Fall	Two people were taking selfies at Alekan waterfall in Charmadi Ghat. The two, Hanumanthappa (34) and Nagabhushan (38), lost balance and fell into the waterfall. They were both killed.	
23 July 2016	India	1	0	Fall	At Amboli Falls in Sindhudurg district, Maharashtra, a youth fell into a 60-foot-deep gorge while taking a selfie and died.	
27 July 2016	India	1	0	Drowned	A 24-year-old woman was swept away to her death by the swollen waters of the Baandal river near Maldevta area on the outskirts of Dehradun while taking a selfie at the time of the incident.	
30 July 2016	India	1	0	Drowned	A 20-year-old athlete slipped and fell into a pond while taking a selfie near a harvesting plant at the Sports Authority of India (SAI) centre in Bhopal. She was taken to a hospital where she was pronounced dead.	
31 July 2016	India	1	1	Fall	A 24-year-old man fell to his death while taking a selfie near the Vindham waterfall in Uttar Pradesh. A friend who dove into the water to rescue him was hospitalized.	
2 August 2016	United States	0	1	Firearm	A 22-year-old Florida woman accidentally shot her phone while taking a picture of herself for Snapchat while posing with a .40 caliber pistol. She suffered minor injuries to her hand. The phone was shattered.	
3 August 2016	India	1	0	Fall	A 22-year-old student was vacationing with six friends in Tamil Nadu. While taking a selfie standing on the edge of a 2,000-foot-deep gorge at Vilpatti village on upper Kodaikanal hill, he slipped and plunged to his death.	
7 August 2016	India	1	0	Fall	A 27-year-old woman was visiting Mandoshi ghat, near Bhimashanjar. She and her husband were sitting on boulders that formed a safety barrier from a 100-foot gorge below. As she positioned herself for a selfie, one of the boulders came loose in wet earth, and she slipped over the edge. Her husband attempted to stop her fall, but was unable to hold on. She sustained head injuries and was taken to hospital by her husband, where she was pronounced dead.	
12 August 2016	India	1	0	Fall	A 22-year-old student of Kherva Ganpat University, Mehsana, Gujarat, India, climbed a glass dome on the third-floor terrace of a building to take a selfie. The fragile glass collapsed, and she fell 70 feet (21 m) to the ground floor and was killed. Selfies were subsequently banned at the school in "risky places".	
12 August 2016	India	4	0	Drowned	Four teenagers aged 15–19 took selfies in the ocean surf at Maharashtra during a storm. They were swept away by a large wave, and their bodies were never recovered.	
15 August 2016	India	1	0	Fall	A class 12 student residing at Peelamedu was sightseeing with friends and noticed a huge well dug in a field. While leaning over the edge of the well to take a selfie to show its depth, he slipped and fell in. The well was 120 feet (37 m) deep with a water level of 60 feet (18 m). He died in the well before he could be rescued.	
16 August 2016	Pakistan	3	0	Drowned	An 11-year-old girl drowned while attempting to take a selfie at the Kunhar River in Khyber Pakhtunkhwa. The girl's mother jumped into the fast-moving river to save her, but was also swept away and drowned. On seeing both his daughter and wife in trouble, the father jumped in; he also drowned. The dead bodies of the mother and her daughter were found; the father's body was missing.	
16 August 2016	India	0	1	Firearm	A 35-year-old woman from Muzaffarnagar was taking a selfie with a gun when it fired. She sustained serious injuries.	
20 August 2016	Pakistan	2	0	Drowned	A man drowned while attempting to take a selfie at the Kunhar River in Khyber Pakhtunkhwa. His cousin jumped in to save him, but she was also swept away and drowned.	
21 August 2016	Pakistan	3	0	Other	Three women were killed while taking selfies near a road at Lake Saiful Muluk. They were inside a melt hole, or cave, at the front edge of a receding glacier when the roof collapsed and they were crushed.	
17 September 2016	India	5	0	Drowned	Six young women students were standing on a rock at the edge of a reservoir in Hanumakonda district of Telangana, taking selfies. One student slipped and fell into the lake, and the rest of the group went in to save her. One student survived, and five drowned.	
1 October 2016	Nepal	1	0	Fall	A 19-year-old man was taking a selfie when he slipped off a cliff and fell into Dordi stream in Lamjung district. His body was not immediately recovered.	
1 October 2016	India	2	0	Drowned	Two teenagers from Hyderabad were taking selfies in a quarry recently filled with rainwater. They went too deep and drowned.	
8 October 2016	Oman	2	0	Drowned	Two Sri Lankan girls were visiting Ain Garziz with their families. While at a picnic, they were taking selfies near a deep spring. One girl slipped into the spring and grabbed the hand of the other. She was unable to pull her companion out, and was dragged down into the water where both of them drowned.	
9 October 2016	India	1	0	Fall	A 25-year-old man fell to his death while taking a selfie with his friends at Lion's Point Valley near Lonavla. He slipped and fell 200 feet (61 m) into a gorge.	
9 October 2016	Sri Lanka	1	0	Transport	A Chinese woman fell from a moving train while taking a selfie and later died from her injuries.	
11 October 2016	India	1	0	Drowned	A student drowned in the Jaldhaka River at Bindu village, Kalimpong subdivision in West Bengal. The body was retrieved four days later.	
12 October 2016	India	1	0	Drowned	A 25-year-old engineer fell into a river and drowned in Gajapati, Odisha, while taking a selfie.	
18 October 2016	Russia	1	0	Fall	A 12-year-old schoolgirl climbed over a balcony on the 17th floor of a building and fell while taking a selfie.	
11 November 2016	India	2	0	Drowned	Two students drowned while taking selfies; they were swept away by currents in the Nagarjuna Sagar canal.	
1 January 2017	India	1	0	Transport	A 21-year-old student died when he was hit by a speeding train while trying to take a selfie in Coimbatore, Tamil Nadu.	
4 January 2017	Pakistan	0	1	Drowned	In Sukkur, Asif Jamil fell into the Indus River while taking a selfie at the Lansdowne Bridge Rohri. He was presumed drowned, but was found at the Rohri Tehsil hospital ten days later.	
6 January 2017	Croatia	1	1	Electrocution	In Rijeka, two men climbed onto a container on a train where they wanted to take a selfie. A 20-year-old was killed and his 19-year-old friend was in serious condition, with second and third degree burns on more than 70 percent of his body as a result of an electric shock of 25,000 volts.	
13 January 2017	India	1	0	Drowned	Ashana Bhandari, fell into the Alaknanda River while she was trying to take a selfie near Koteshwar temple in Rudraprayag district in Uttarakhand.	
14 January 2017	India	1	0	Transport	A second-year college student died while taking a selfie in front of a running train on a railway track in Chandrakona Road, Paschim Medinipur district, West Bengal. He was immediately hit by the speeding train and died instantly.	
14 January 2017	India	2	0	Transport	Two teenagers were crushed under a train while posing between two railway tracks at Anand Vihar, East Delhi. They had decided to go to the railway lines to take "daring selfies" for their social media profiles.	
25 January 2017	India	1	0	Transport	A 22-year-old man died while attempting to take a selfie on the railway tracks near Dhuri Lines, Ludhiana, Punjab. A passenger train hit him while he was taking selfies.	
5 February 2017	India	1	0	Fall	A 22-year-old college student died after falling into a 160 feet (49 m) ravine while taking a selfie near Kolukhet on Dehradun-Mussoorie road in Uttarakhand.	
9 February 2017	New Zealand	1	0	Drowned	Four women were taking selfies on a rock in a river, ignoring a warning siren signaling a dam was about to be opened. One of the women, a 21-year-old university student, was swept to her death by the dam surge.	
24 March 2017	India	1	0	Electrocution	A 13-year-old boy was electrocuted after climbing atop a stationary train to take selfies and coming into contact with an overhead power line. He suffered burns across 72 percent of his body and died of his injuries four days later.	
25 March 2017	United States	1	0	Drowned	A 14-year-old girl was standing on a log with friends at a beach in Bandon, Oregon, to pose for photos, possibly including selfies. She fell off and was fatally pinned underwater by the log due to the receding tide. According to the girl's mother, when this occurred it was not a selfie; rather her picture was being taken by a friend.	
25 March 2017	Mexico	2	0	Transport	In Chínipas de Almada, Chihuahua, two females aged 17 and 18 went to see horse races at a track adjacent to an airport runway. They climbed onto the roof of a truck or a van to take selfies, failing to notice an aircraft approaching the airfield to land. The aircraft's wing hit and fatally injured both women. This would later earn them a Darwin Award.	
10 April 2017	United States	1	0	Firearm	A 13-year-old boy accidentally shot himself in the head when he held up a gun to himself while he was filming an Instagram live video.	
13 April 2017	India	5	0	Transport	Taraknath Makal was travelling by train with four friends – Sumit Kumar, Sanjiv Polley, Kajal Saha and Chandan Polley – all aged between 25 and 30 years – when he reportedly leaned out of the door to take a selfie. However, he lost his footing and fell off the train. Makal's companions jumped out to save him, but ended up getting mowed down by another train coming from the opposite direction. Makal's friends died on the spot while Makal died in hospital. The incident occurred between Liluah and Belur stations, in the vicinity of Howrah.	
30 April 2017	Germany	1	0	Transport	A Scotsman was knocked down and killed after trying to take a selfie on a motorway. He was with two friends when he was hit by a car on the A24 Autobahn in Gudow, near Hamburg. Witnesses reported seeing the three men taking "cell phone pictures of themselves".	
8 May 2017	India	1	0	Drowned	A 21-year-old student slipped from a rock and drowned near Bandra Fort in Bandra, Mumbai after trying to take a selfie with her mother and sister.	
24 May 2017	India	2	0	Drowned	Two adults, 21 and 22 years old from Hooghly district, drowned in a fish pond while taking a selfie. They were taking selfies in waist-deep water when the duo slipped from the bank and went underwater. Later, divers from Kolkata recovered both the bodies from the pond.	
30 May 2017	India	1	1	Transport	At Alwal Railway station near Secunderabad, a man died while another lost his hand when the two were run over by a moving train while taking selfies.	
7 June 2017	India	0	1	Animal	A man in Dhenkanal district was seriously injured by a wild elephant when he tried to take a selfie with it.	
11 June 2017	Sri Lanka	2	0	Transport	Two brothers, aged 25 and 12, were killed when they were hit by a train while they were taking a selfie standing on the rail track. They were standing on the coastal train track between Bambalapitiya and Kollupitiya stations attempting to take a selfie when they were hit by an Aluthgama-bound express train from Maradana to Galle.	
11 June 2017	Russia	3	1	Transport	Four children aged 10 to 13 were hit by a train while trying to take a selfie on a railway line in Nadezhdinsky District of Primorsky Krai, 43 km northwest of Vladivostok. Three were killed and one survived with injuries.	
13 June 2017	Sri Lanka	1	1	Transport	A 24-year-old groom was killed and his bride seriously injured when the newly-wed couple tried to take a selfie on the railway track at Kahawa, in the Southern Province. According to eyewitnesses, the couple had ignored warning signals given by the people in the area saying that the train was coming.	
13 June 2017	Russia	1	0	Electrocution	A 15-year-old boy was killed when he tried to climb onto a high-voltage wire to take a selfie in Perm Krai.	
16 June 2017	Russia	1	0	Electrocution	A 17-year-old boy was killed when he took a selfie near a high-voltage electric cable in Novosibirsk Oblast.	
17 June 2017	Russia	1	0	Electrocution	A 14-year-old girl was electrocuted when taking a selfie on a railway bridge in Moscow Oblast when her head accidentally touched the overhead wires.	
22 June 2017	United Kingdom	1	0	Fall	A 23-year-old South Korean woman fell from Seaford Head while jumping in the air to pose for a photo.	
27 June 2017	India	1	0	Drowned	A 17-year-old girl drowned in Mumbai while taking selfies with her friends. She was swept away by a strong wave.	
1 July 2017	Nigeria	2	2	Drowned	Four undergraduate students of the Federal University of Technology, Akure, were taking selfies in a canoe while boating on a campus pond when the canoe capsized. Two students who could swim made it to safety, while two others drowned.	
10 July 2017	India	8	0	Drowned	A boat capsized in Vena reservoir near Nagpur while its passengers were taking selfies and broadcasting on Facebook live.	
16 July 2017	India	0	48	Fire	48 people were injured when standing too close to a burning bakery in Chennai to take selfies. They repeatedly ignored warnings advising them to move away from the blaze.	
25 July 2017	India	1	0	Animal	A 30-year-old man snuck into the Bannerghatta National Park near Bangalore with friends to take selfies with an elephant that later trampled him to death.	
26 July 2017	Hungary	0	1	Fall	A girl fell off a bridge in Budapest while taking selfies and suffered serious injuries.	
26 July 2017	India	1	0	Drowned	An 18-year-old man was swept into the sea and drowned while he was taking a selfie at a beach in Mumbai during high tide.	
11 August 2017	India	0	1	Electrocution	A 17-year-old boy climbed on top of a train in Ambarnath to take a selfie but came into contact with a live wire, suffering severe injuries from the resulting electric shock.	
26 August 2017	India	1	0	Electrocution	A 17-year-old boy attempted to take a selfie on top of a train carriage in Tambaram railway station. He touched a live wire, suffered severe burns from electric shock, and died four days later.	
2 September 2017	India	1	0	Animal	A youth in Rourkela, Odisha, was trampled to death by a wild elephant while trying to take a selfie with the animal.	
12 September 2017	United Kingdom	1	0	Transport	A 41-year-old woman from New Zealand who took a selfie as she rode her bike died after she fell off shortly afterwards, following a night out to celebrate her mother's birthday in London. The graphic designer and mother of two was with her mother when they rode home from the pub. The 41-year-old had drunk two cocktails and four glasses of wine, and was not wearing a helmet. She had allegedly been riding one-handed when she tumbled to the ground, suffering fatal head injuries.	
16 September 2017	Malaysia	1	0	Fall	A 20-year-old man believed to be taking a selfie died after he fell from the 16th floor of a resort hotel in Genting Highlands, Pahang. It is speculated that he had climbed a wall on the hotel's car park to take photographs when he slipped and fell.	
28 October 2017	United States	1	3	Transport	A 16-year-old girl from Texas was with three friends going to a Halloween party. After she removed her seat belt to take a selfie, the vehicle lost control, went off the road, and ejected her, killing her. Her three friends were injured.	
12 November 2017	United Kingdom	1	0	Fall	A 20-year-old woman from New Zealand died after she allegedly attempted to take a selfie near a second-storey window in London. She suffered a serious brain injury as a result of the fall, and died two days later.	
25 December 2017	Mexico	1	0	Fall	A 20-year-old woman died during a selfie session in the Malpaso Dam in Aguascalientes. Witnesses said she accessed a restricted zone to take the selfie before slipping and falling about 50 feet (15 m), dying from severe cranioencephalic trauma.	
8 January 2018	Croatia	1	0	Electrocution	In Zagreb, a 14-year-old boy climbed onto the roof of a train cargo wagon where he wanted to take a selfie. He was electrocuted and his body "burned like a torch." Firefighters were unable to take action until the train's power was turned off.	
11 January 2018	Colombia	1	0	Fall	In Gámbita, Santander, a 19-year-old girl fell to her death while trying to take a selfie at "Manto de la Virgen" falls.	
21 January 2018	India	0	1	Transport	A 22-year-old man was struck from behind by a train in Hyderabad while recording a selfie video immediately adjacent to the Hyderabad Multi-Modal Transport System line near Borabanda railway station. The video he filmed captured the entire incident, and showed him ignoring warnings from nearby staff and the train's horn, then being knocked down by the train, sustaining head injuries in the accident. After recovering from his injuries, he attended court, and was fined 500 rupees for trespassing.	
9 February 2018	Thailand	1	1	Transport	A 24-year-old woman died when a train hit her while attempting to take a photo with an outgoing train in the background near Samsen train station in Bangkok's Phaya Thai District. A man, believed to be a colleague of the victim, was knocked unconscious by the train, suffering a head injury and a broken arm.	
11 March 2018	United States	5	0	Transport/Drowned	Five passengers aboard a sightseeing helicopter with doors off drowned after a passenger allegedly tried to take a 'shoe selfie', leading to the passenger's safety tether getting caught in the emergency fuel shutoff lever. A shoe selfie is when the person's shoes can be seen while looking out of the open doorway of a helicopter. The helicopter's pilot survived the splashdown in the East River, and managed to climb out of the helicopter and call for help, but rescue arrived too late to save the passengers.	
20 April 2018	Greece	1	0	Fall	In Keratsini, a 16-year-old boy died after he fell from a height of about 200 feet (61 m) after climbing on a rock to take a selfie at a park.	
22 April 2018	Brazil	0	3	Fall	In Castelo do Piauí, a 22-year-old woman and two girls aged 16 and 15 fell from a height of about 30 feet (9.1 m) while taking a selfie on a bridge when the platform on the side of the bridge collapsed. They suffered fractures.	
30 April 2018	Brazil	1	0	Fall	At Corumbá Lake in Caldas Novas, a 34-year-old man drowned after falling off a platform in an attempt to take a selfie.	
2 May 2018	India	1	0	Animal	In Nabarangpur, Odisha, a man tried to take a selfie with a wounded bear and was mauled to death.	
6 May 2018	China	1	0	Electrocution	A 22-year-old photographer was taking video from on top of a train in China when he was electrocuted by the high-voltage power cable, resulting in burns over 80% of his body and coma. He died two days later.	
11 June 2018	Indonesia	1	0	Fall	A 46-year-old Chinese tourist died after falling into the sea while taking a selfie on a cliff at Devil's Tears on Nusa Lembongan, off the coast of Bali.	
12 June 2018	Portugal	2	0	Fall	On the Praia dos Pescadores, Ericeira, an Australian couple fell to their deaths when they tried to take a selfie on a 30-meter-high (98 ft) wall.	
17 June 2018	India	1	0	Drowning	A teenage boy drowned in the bay adjacent to Marine Drive in Mumbai after being swept away while trying to take a selfie.	
20 June 2018	India	1	0	Fall	A 33-year-old woman died after falling into a 500-foot (150 m) deep valley while taking a selfie in Matheran, Maharashtra.	
3 July 2018	France	1	0	Fall	Chinese billionaire Wang Jian, co-founder of HNA Group, died in a tragic accident after falling from a wall while attempting to take a photograph in Provence, France, on 3 July 2018	
10 July 2018	French Polynesia	1	0	Fall	A 15-year-old girl fell to her death while taking a selfie near a waterfall.	
22 July 2018	Australia	1	0	Fall	A 19-year-old American man fell to his death at Cape Solander in Kurnell, near Sydney.	
4 September 2018	United States	1	0	Fall	An Israeli teen fell to his death while trying to take a selfie at Yosemite National Park.	
19 September 2018	United States	1	0	Fall	A woman fell to her death while taking selfies on the edge of a 200-foot cliff over Lake Superior at Pictured Rocks National Lakeshore.	
12 October 2018	Panama	1	0	Fall	A Portuguese woman fell to her death while taking a selfie on the 27th floor balcony of a residential building.	
25 October 2018	United States	2	0	Fall	An Indian couple fell to their deaths from Taft Point at Yosemite National Park.	
12 November 2018	Sri Lanka	1	0	Fall	A German tourist died after stumbling off a cliff while taking a photo of herself. The 35-year-old woman was taking pictures with her friend when she fell off the World's End, a sheer cliff about 4,000 feet (1,200 meters) high. The Sri Lankan army and volunteers recovered the body after a six-hour search involving air support and climbing.	
4 January 2019	Ireland	1	0	Fall	A young Indian man died after falling off the Cliffs of Moher, County Clare, while taking a photo of himself.	
10 January 2019	Colombia	1	0	Fall	A 32-year-old man died after fall down in a waterfall in Sucre, Cauca, while he attempted to take a photo of himself.	
11 February 2019	India	1	0	Electrocution	A 16 year-old died after he climbed on top of a train to take a selfie. He was electrocuted by an overhead wire near the Bherugarh railway station in Jhabua in Madhya Pradesh.	
9 March 2019	United States	0	1	Animal	A woman was mauled by a jaguar in Arizona after entering a zoo enclosure to take a selfie. She received non-life-threatening injuries, including a large gash on her arm. Note: Although widely reported as a selfie incident, the victim claimed in a later CBS News interview that she was not taking a selfie, and did not enter the zoo enclosure—she only reached across a below-waist-height concrete planter in front of a much higher fenced enclosure—misleadingly termed "climbing" or "crossing" a barrier.	
April 2019	Uganda	1	0	Drowned	A person visiting Kalagala Falls leaned back to take a selfie, slipped on the wet ground, fell, and drowned.	
6 April 2019	Russia	0	1	Fall	A girl was seriously injured after falling 30 meters from the 10th floor of a high-rise building while attempting to take a selfie.	
24 April 2019	Germany	2	0	Drowned	A 21-year-old man was swimming in the Gumpen waterfall pool. When the man was unable to free himself from the waterfall swirl, his friend of the same age jumped in to help him out of the 4–6 °C water. Both drowned.	
4 July 2019	Spain	2	0	Fall	Two Englishmen aged 20 and 25 died while reportedly taking a selfie while on holiday at Punta Prima Beach, near the town of Torrevieja.	
14 July 2019	Italy	1	0	Fall	A 22-year-old man died after falling from a cliff with a waterfall.	
15 July 2019	Pakistan	1	0	Fall	A college student fell into the Kabul River in Nowshera district of Khyber Pakhtunkhwa while taking a selfie.	
16 July 2019	Pakistan	2	0	Drowned	A 17-year-old girl slipped while taking a selfie and fell into a river. Her father jumped into the river in an attempt to rescue her, but was also swept away by the flowing water.	
17 August 2019	Australia	1	0	Fall	A 27-year-old woman died after falling from a cliff at Diamond Bay Reserve in Vaucluse, Sydney.	
3 September 2019	India	1	0	Fall	A woman fell at least 200 feet (61 m) to her death while allegedly taking a selfie on her way to a temple on a hilltop in Pavagadh hill station, Gujarat.	
6 October 2019	India	4	0	Drowned	Six family members attending a wedding fell into the water at a dam while they were trying to take a selfie. Four of them drowned, including the bride.	
14 November 2019	Thailand	1	0	Fall	A 33-year-old died when they were on a waterfall and attempted to take a selfie when they slipped and fell.	
8 January 2020	Colombia	1	0	Fall	A 29-year-old woman died after falling 10 metres (33 ft) down in a waterfall in Sucre, Cauca. According to an eyewitness, she was attempting to take a selfie, ignoring written warnings.	
12 January 2020	Australia	1	0	Fall	A 21-year-old Englishwoman fell from a 98-foot-high cliff in Diamond Bay Reserve in Sydney. The woman, accompanied by seven friends, climbed a fence to sit on the edge of the cliff and take selfies.	
30 April 2020	Turkey	1	0	Fall	A 31-year-old Kazakhstani fell from a 115-foot-high cliff trying to take a selfie with a waterfall in Duden Park, Antalya, to celebrate the lifting of the COVID-19 lockdown.	
14 May 2020	Malta	1	0	Fall	A 15-year-old Italian girl who was on vacation took a selfie on a balcony and accidentally fell four storeys to her death.	
19 November 2020	India	1	0	Electrocution	A 14-year-old boy died of electrocution in Tirunelveli city in southern Tamil Nadu while attempting to take a selfie on a parked train engine when he came in contact with a high-voltage power line at the Tirunelveli Junction Railway Station.	
12 December 2020	Australia	1	0	Fall	A 38-year-old woman fell about 260 feet (79 m) and died at a popular tourist photo spot in The Grampians in Victoria. According to authorities, she jumped over a safety barrier and tripped off the cliff edge.	
12 January 2021	Slovenia	1	1	Transport	An accident in Maribor occurred when two minors were taking selfies in front of an oncoming train between two tracks. One was killed and the other was hospitalized from shock. Both were photographed between the tracks next to the railway platform in front of a train coming from the direction of Ljubljana at high speed.	
16 May 2021	Indonesia	9	11	Drowned	A boat overloaded with 20 people in a reservoir in Central Java capsized when the passengers all suddenly moved to one side of the vessel, which was helmed by a 13-year-old, to take a group selfie. Nine of the passengers drowned, including two children.	
3 July 2021	India	3	0	Drowned	Three teenage girls drowned in an irrigation tank in Singangaon village, Nirmal district, Telangana, while trying to take selfies.	
10 July 2021	Hong Kong	1	0	Fall	32-year-old influencer Sofia Cheung died after slipping and falling about 15 feet (4.6 m) in the Ha Pak Lai nature park, while she was taking a selfie with friends at the edge of a waterfall. Her Instagram account featured photos of her outdoor adventures, including scaling cliffs and mountaintops.	
11 July 2021	India	11	0	Electrocution	Eleven people died in Rajasthan after being struck by lightning near a watchtower at the Amer Fort. According to police, some of the victims were taking selfies near the tower.	
28 July 2021	Italy	1	0	Fall	22-year-old Danish YouTuber Albert Dyrlund died after falling about 660 feet (200 m) from Forcella di Pana while he was recording for his channel.	
6 August 2021	Hungary	1	0	Fall	A 19-year-old Dutchman died after falling from the Liberty Bridge in Budapest. It was reported that he climbed the bridge to take a selfie.	
20 August 2021	Turkey	1	0	Fall	While filming a TikTok video with her cousin, a 23-year-old woman fell to her death in Istanbul after accidentally stepping onto a plastic panel on a roof of an apartment building, which collapsed and sent her tumbling about 50 metres (160 ft) down a shaft.	
15 September 2021	England	1	0	Transport	A driver who was taking a selfie while speeding near Roudham, Norfolk crashed into a man riding a moped and killed him.	
6 December 2021	India	1	0	Fall	A teenage boy died in Mumbai after falling off of the edge of the second floor of a partially demolished building while taking a selfie.	
24 January 2022	United States	1	0	Fall	A hiker in Arizona slipped and fell approximately 700 feet (210 meters) to his death while trying to take a photo in Lost Dutchman State Park near the Superstition Mountains.	
21 March 2022	Italy	0	1	Electrocution	A 15-year-old was electrocuted when he climbed and rode a moving train at Cambiano to take pictures.	
25 March 2022	United States	2	0	Firearm	Two cousins aged 12 and 14 were filming an Instagram live video while playing with a gun when one accidentally shot her cousin before killing herself.	
7 April 2022	India	1	0	Electrocution	A 16-year-old climbed on top of a train to take a selfie, but made contact with live wires and was electrocuted, killing him instantly.	
28 August 2022	India	6	0	Drowned	Six members of the same family drowned at Ramdaha Falls in Chhattisgarh. Two teenage sisters attempted to take a selfie but slipped into the water. Four other relatives tried to save them but they all drowned.	
10 November 2022	United States	1	0	Fall	A man filming himself on the back of a semi-trailer truck was killed when the driver, unaware of the man on his trailer, drove under an underpass.	
11 November 2022	India	1	0	Animal	A 26-year-old man died after attempting to take a selfie with a venomous snake when it fatally bit him.	
23 November 2022	Italy	1	0	Drowned	A woman was hit by a wave on the Amalfi Coast in Italy, while she was trying to take pictures. The wave tossed her to the ground, where she hit her head against the rocks.	
26 December 2022	Argentina	1	0	Fall	A woman fell approximately 330 feet (100 m) from a cliff in Cañón del Atuel, Mendoza, while attempting to take a selfie.	
27 December 2022	Thailand	1	0	Fall	A 45-year-old New Zealand tourist slipped and fell about 30 feet (9.1 m) to his death while taking a selfie from an opened carriage door on the Thai-Burma railway.	
23 April 2023	India	1	0	Decapitated	As he attempted to take a selfie on a helipad, Jitendra Kumar Saini, the financial controller of the Uttarakhand State Civil Aviation development authority was killed by a helicopter rotor blade.	
5 May 2023	India	1	0	Transport	A 16-year-old in Sanathnagar, Hyderabad, was hit by a train while taking selfies and videos with two of his friends. He was standing near the train tracks and was faced backwards from the oncoming train. His friends moved away and were unharmed.	
5 August 2023	United States	0	3	Electrocution	Three teenagers in Chicago were electrocuted after touching the third rail while taking a selfie on train tracks.	
15 February 2024	India	1	0	Animal	A 38-year-old man went over a 12-foot fence to enter the lion enclosure at a zoo in Tirupati in order to take a selfie. He entered the enclosure close to the lions who immediately and fatally attacked him.	
9 April 2024	Georgia	1	0	Fall	A 39-year-old woman climbed over a barrier at a viewing point in Abkhazia to take a selfie, stumbled and fell more than 170 feet (52 m) to her death.	
17 April 2024	United Kingdom	2	0	Drowned	Two male students aged 22 and 26 were taking selfies near Blair Atholl, Scotland, but slipped and were swept away by the river at Linn of Tummel.	
20 May 2024	United States	1	0	Firearm	A 17-year-old rapper accidentally shot himself while filming a video on Instagram after he pointed a gun at his head and pulled the trigger.	
4 June 2024	Mexico	1	0	Transport	While taking a selfie too close to the tracks, a woman was struck and killed by the newly-reactivated Canadian Pacific 2816 Empress steam locomotive, which was passing through the town of Nopala in Hidalgo, Mexico.	
7 June 2024	Brazil	0	1	Transport	A cyclist standing too close to the tracks was hit by a train while taking selfies with her friends near Uberaba.	
7 August 2024	Indonesia	1	1	Fall	A couple fell more than 80 feet when taking a selfie near a waterfall in Bali. The man died and the woman survived.	
21 August 2024	Germany	1	0	Fall	Czech gymnast Natálie Štíchová fell approximately 80 metres (260 ft) when attempting to take a selfie near the Neuschwanstein castle in Germany and died a few days later.	
25 August 2024	India	3	0	Drowned	Three girls (ages 19, 21, and 21) were taking selfies near a jetty when the 19-year-old fell into the Ganga river. The other two attempted to rescue her, but they were also swept away; all three drowned.	
5 September 2024	India	2	0	Drowning	Two friends, a 22-year-old man and a 17-year-old girl, drowned in the Indrayani River near Maval temple after slipping from a rock while taking selfies.	
6 September 2024	India	1	0	Animal	A 20-year-old youth in Nizamabad was fatally bitten by a cobra while taking a selfie video with the animal.	
21 September 2024	United Kingdom	1	0	Transport	An 81-year-old cyclist died after a driver taking Snapchat selfies hit him off his tricycle with his car, after which he was run over by a second vehicle.	
27 September 2024	Georgia	1	0	Fall	Russian influencer Arina Glazunova fell into a subway entrance in Tbilisi, Georgia, while taking a selfie video of herself singing with a friend on a night out.	
11 January 2025	India	5	0	Drowning	Five engineering students drowned in the Kondapochamma Sagar reservoir in Siddipet district, Telangana, after they and two other students entered to take a selfie and slipped. The two other students were rescued by local villagers.	
23 January 2025	Japan	1	0	Transport	A 61-year-old woman from Hong Kong made her way onto the tracks in Hokkaido to take a picture when she was struck by an oncoming New Chitose Airport-bound express train. She was then taken to a hospital to where she was pronounced dead.	
25 January 2025	Bulgaria	1	0	Fall	A 29-year-old man from Ireland died of his injuries a day after falling off the Bansko mountain ski resort in southern Bulgaria while taking photos.	
7 February 2025	Turks and Caicos Islands	0	1	Animal	A Canadian tourist had both hands bitten off when attempting to take a selfie with a shark in shallow water.	
22 February 2025	Sri Lanka	1	0	Fall	A 53-year-old woman was leaning outside of a moving train while trying to take a selfie. She hit a rock and was killed after she fell off the train.	
15 April 2025	Spain	1	0	Fall	A 63-year-old British tourist died after falling from a wall while taking photos at a popular tourist spot in Spain.	
20 April 2025	Indonesia	0	1	Other	Travel vlogger Katy Johnson was filming a selfie video on the rocks overlooking the picturesque turquoise waters when she was struck by a rogue wave and nearly swept away. She survived with mild injuries.	
21 April 2025	India	1	0	Fall	A 28-year-old IT professional died in a fall; management stated she took off her helmet for a selfie and leaned against a safety barricade that collapsed.	
29 April 2025	Philippines	0	1	Animal	A 29-year-old man climbed into an enclosure to take a selfie with a crocodile he had mistaken for a statue and was attacked.	
7 May 2025	Spain	1	0	Fall	A 48-year-old died in Las Palmas after he fell from an eighth floor room of the Aloe Canteras Hotel and landed on the concrete promenade.	
18 May 2025	India	1	0	Fall	A 16-year-old girl in Mumbai died after falling from a terrace wall in her housing society while trying to take a selfie with the sunset.	
30 May 2025	Thailand	0	1	Animal	An Indian man was attempting to take a selfie with a tiger when it attacked him.	
31 May 2025	India	1	0	Drowned	A 20-year-old died when he fell into the sea in Mumbai while apparently taking photographs with his friends. Lifeguards at the spot later managed to pull the man out of the waters. They rushed him to nearby Cooper Hospital where he was declared dead.	
27 June 2025	India	1	0	Fall	A 20-year-old died at Rongkuchi Falls in Meghalaya's West Garo Hills district after falling into the water while attempting to take a selfie near the waterfall.	
4 July 2025	Romania	1	0	Animal	A man aged 48–49 took a selfie with a bear before he was mauled to death in Romania.	
15 July 2025	Italy	1	0	Other	A 15-year-old girl was crushed and killed by a boulder when she was trying to take a selfie with friends at a scenic spot in Italy.	
26 July 2025	Pakistan	1	0	Other	A young boy died while trying to take a selfie on a train near the Holloki Railway station. While hanging out of the train door, he struck a pole, killing him.	
27 July 2025	India	1	0	Drowned	A 16-year-old boy drowned in the Kanhaiya Kol waterfall in Madhya Pradesh's Betul while taking a selfie. His body was found a day later, trapped between the rocks under the waterfall.	
4 August 2025	Germany	0	1	Electrocution	A man climbed on top of a train to take a selfie when he got too close to a power line and was electrocuted. He fell off from the train and was taken to a hospital.	
8 August 2025	Greece	2	0	Drowned	A woman trying to take a selfie fell into the water while on a cruise; her husband jumped in to try to save her, but both drowned after being swept out to sea during strong winds.	
10 August 2025	India	0	1	Animal	A man trying to take a selfie with an elephant was trampled after the elephant was startled by the camera flash and charged. He was fined ₹25,000 (equivalent to ₹26,000 or US$280 in 2026) and required to record a public video confession.	
1 September 2025	Russia	1	0	Fall	A 45-year-old mother of two sons died after falling nearly 300 feet while attempting to take a selfie to celebrate her birthday after finishing her bungee jump.	
13 September 2025	Portugal	2	0	Transport	Two Canadian women aged 62 and 66 were hit and killed by a train while they were taking photos during their trip to Portugal.	
14 September 2025	India	0	1	Electrocution	A 16-year-old boy suffered serious injuries when he touched a high voltage wire while trying to take a selfie on the roof of a train.	
25 September 2025	China	1	0	Fall	A 31-year-old tourist died after unhooking his safety rope to take selfies. While doing so, he tripped over his crampons and fell approximately 100 to 200 meters into his death.	
28 September 2025	Kenya	1	0	Fall	A 25-year-old man died when he fell into a gorge while taking a selfie during a hiking trip with friends. His body was recovered a few days later.	
19 October 2025	India	0	1	Electrocution	A 16-year-old boy touched an overhead high-tension wire and was injured after climbing on a stationed rail tanker while trying to take a selfie.	
2 November 2025	Turkey	1	0	Fall/Other	A 32-year-old pregnant woman was killed after her 40-year-old husband pushed her off of a 1,000 foot cliff after taking a selfie together.	
8 December 2025	China	0	1	Fall	A tourist fell from a 130 foot cliff while taking a selfie; he survived.	
13 December 2025	Australia	1	1	Fall	A 17-year-old girl died after falling off a cliff while taking selfies at Moffat Beach in Queensland, Australia. Another woman was injured while trying to help the teenager.	
19 December 2025	India	1	0	Animal	A 33-year-old was killed by an elephant after attempting to take a selfie with the animal.	
7 January 2026	Thailand	1	0	Fall	A 22-year-old tourist died after slipping and falling from a rock at the Na Muang 2 waterfall on Koh Samui while taking photos and selfies.	
23 January 2026	China	0	1	Animal	A female ski tourist was mauled by a snow leopard while attempting to take a selfie with the animal.	
8 February 2026	India	1	0	Fall	A 26-year-old man died after falling into a 70 to 80 feet deep gorge while taking a selfie with a scenic view on Khandala Hill.	
13 February 2026	Russia	1	0	Fall	A 17-year-old fell off the top of a building while trying to pose for 'extreme selfies'. He sustained several injures and died 2 hours later.	
15 February 2026	Bangladesh	1	0	Transport	A 32-year-old man died after being struck by a train after taking a selfie on the train tracks.	
21 February 2026	Brazil	1	0	Fall	A 35-year-old fell off the edge of a waterfall while trying to take a selfie.	
21 February 2026	Indonesia	3	0	Transport	Three high school students died after being struck by the Argo Merbabu train while taking selfies near the railway tracks at GOR Sarengat.	
5 March 2026	Namibia	1	0	Animal	A 46-year-old woman was killed by an injured elephant in Namibia's Omusati Region while attempting to take a selfie with the animal, which had been declared dead.	
9 April 2026	India	3	1	Drowned	Four teenage girls fell into the water while attempting to take a selfie at a scenic spot at Patra Mulagummi. Three of them drowned, and one girl was rescued in critical condition.	
12 April 2026	India	1	0	Fall	A 45-year-old man died while attempting to take a selfie from a rock at Azhimala Beach when he fell into the sea.	
13 April 2026	United States	1	0	Animal	A man was killed by a black bear after taking numerous selfies with the animal.	
1 May 2026	India	3	0	Drowned	Four members of a group of six picnickers fell into the water while taking a selfie. Three drowned while the fourth survived.	
2 May 2026	India	4	0	Drowned	During a ceremony, a teenage girl slipped and fell while trying to take a selfie. Three other people attempted to rescue her, but they were also swept away.	
25 May 2026	India	1	0	Fall	A 25-year-old man died after slipping and falling approximately 15 feet from his seat on a theme park ride after his restraint came loose. Some reports suggest this was during a selfie attempt.	
27 May 2026	Russia	1	0	Fall	A 24-year-old student died while attempting to take a selfie when she fell more than 330 feet off of a cliff.	
18 June 2026	India	1	0	Fall	A 26-year-old Pune resident died after falling off about 400 feet into a deep gorge at Lonavala's Lohagard Fort while attempting to take a selfie.	
21 June 2026	India	2	0	Drowned	A mother and her 7-year-old son drowned after accidentally falling into a water tank while taking selfies in Rajasthan's Barmer.	
18 August 2026	Indonesia	1	0	Fall	A hiker died after falling into the crater of Mount Slamet in Central Java. His body was retrieved the next day.	
19 September 2026	Ukraine	0	1	Electrocution	A 13-year-old trying to take a selfie on a train car was electrocuted when he came in contact with the contact network, fell, and sustained additional injuries after climbing on top of a tankers train in Lviv.	

== See also ==
- Balconing
- Death by GPS
- List of graffiti and street-art injuries and deaths
- Mobile phones and driving safety
- Rooftopping
- Texting while driving
