= Computers Don't Argue =

- Short story by Gordon Dickson
- Language: English
- Genre: Science Fiction

Publication
- Published in: Analog Science Fiction and Fact
- Publication type: Magazine
- Publisher: Condé Nast Publications, Inc.
- Media type: Print (magazine)
- Publication date: September 1965

"Computers Don't Argue" is a 1965 science fiction short story by American writer Gordon R. Dickson, about the dangers of relying too strongly upon computers. It was nominated for a Nebula Award for Best Short Story in 1966.

== Synopsis ==
The story is told in the form of correspondence.

Walter A. Child of Panduk, Michigan has a disagreement with his book club in Chicago, Illinois over a damaged copy of Kim by Rudyard Kipling (cost $4.98) that was sent to him. He returns it, asking for a replacement. Instead, he is sent a copy of Kidnapped by Robert Louis Stevenson. He returns it, requesting that the matter be settled. Instead, he receives a second, automated notice.

He replies saying that the book club now owes him money. He receives a third letter, and his reply to it is not read. His account is then turned over to a third-party collection agency, increasing the amount owing to $6.83. A second letter ups it to $7.51, and a third to $10.01. Child responds with a letter explaining the matter, but the agency does not believe him and threatens legal action.

The matter goes to small-claims court in Illinois, the amount having increased to $15.66. A duplicate judgment is passed the next day in Michigan. However, the amount owed and the statute number are transposed on the punch card.

Child sends a letter that he will visit the book-club offices personally and settle the matter himself. Meanwhile the transposed amount is interpreted as Statute 1566, relating to criminal matters. Since no such statute exists, it is changed to 1567 (kidnapping). The changed punch card is then incorrectly interpreted to relate to the kidnapping of a child named Robert Louis Stevenson by a person named A. Walter, and an arrest and hold warrant is issued.

Child is arrested at the book-club offices. The judge requests more information, since a trial transcript is missing from the record. He specifically requests whether the victim, Robert Louis Stevenson, was harmed. The request returns that Stevenson is deceased, having died at age 44. The reply omits the date of death, simply replying that the victim is dead. A personal reply to the judge mentions that the victim was slain and mentions a possible gang connection.

Child's lawyer believes him, but Child is sentenced to execution, for first-degree murder in connection with the death of a kidnap victim. Since no previous trial transcripts are available, the judge is forced to rely on the computerized records.

Since all records have been computerized, appeal time has been cut to five days, and ten for it to be acted upon. Instead of appealing, he appeals to the governor for a pardon. The governor is out of the country and slow to respond. Child refuses an offer by the warden to let him escape, believing that the pardon will arrive in time.

The pardon is issued by the governor, but a post-office routing-number error causes it to arrive too late.

== Adaptations ==
The story was read on Mindwebs in 1978.

=== Translations ===
- In 1966, it was published in French as "Les ordinateurs ne discutent pas".
- In 1969, it was published in Dutch as "Met computers valt niet te praten".
- In 1970, it was published in German as "Computer streiten nicht".
- In 1973, it was published in Hungarian as "A komputer nem tűr ellentmondást".
- In 1978, it was published in Hebrew in Yivsam Azgad's Phantasia 2000 magazine as "Hehatuf" החטוף (The Kidnapped).
- In 1981, it was published in Croatian as "Kompjuteri ne raspravljaju".
- In 1987, it was published in French as "On ne discute pas avec les ordinateurs".
- In 1996, it was published in Urania Magazine as "I computer non discutono", translated to Italian by Elisabetta Moreolo Svaluto.

== See also ==
- Computer says no
- Garbage in, garbage out
