= Selfie stick =

Photography equipment

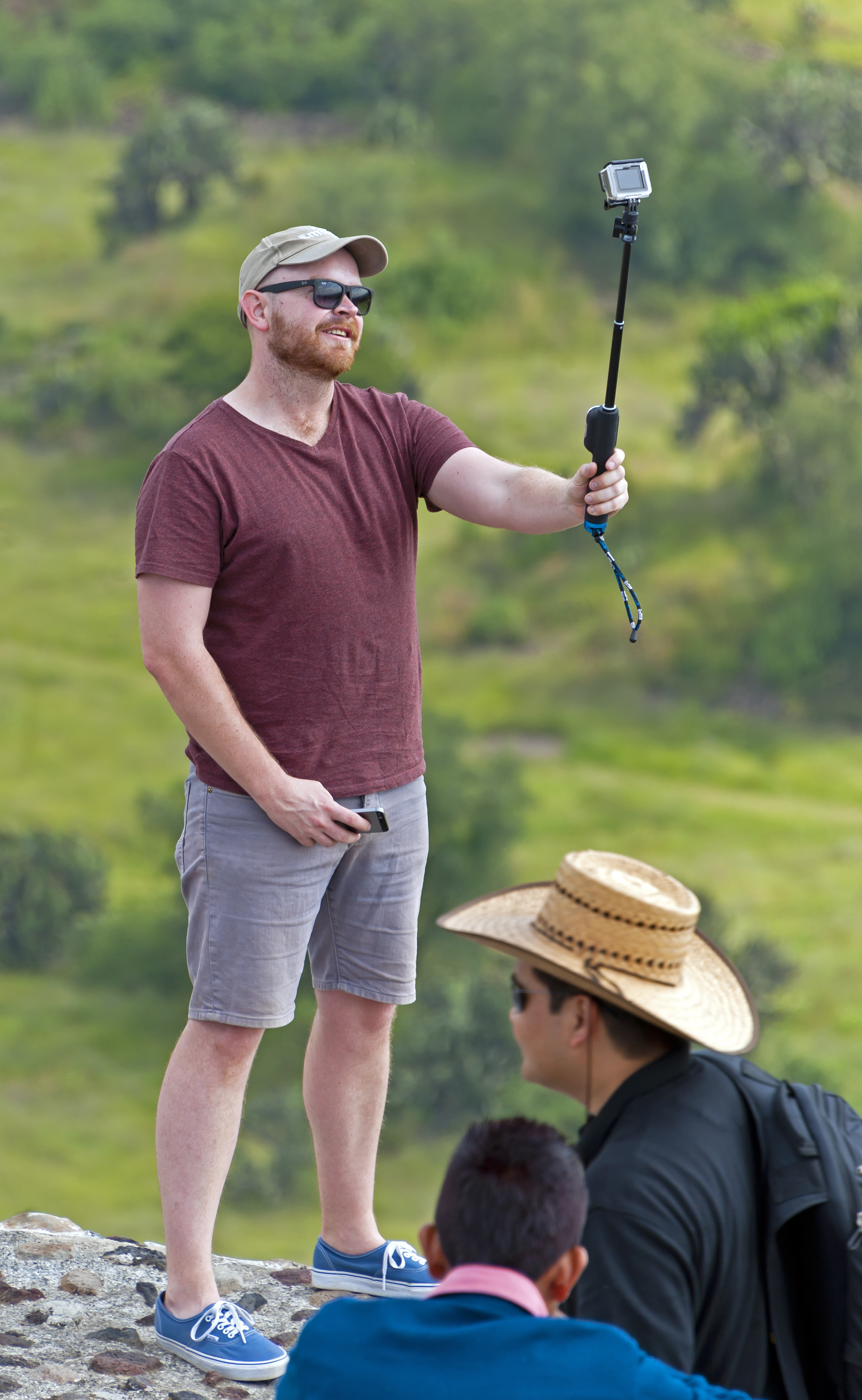
A tourist using a selfie stick near the top of the Pyramid of the Sun at Teotihuacan

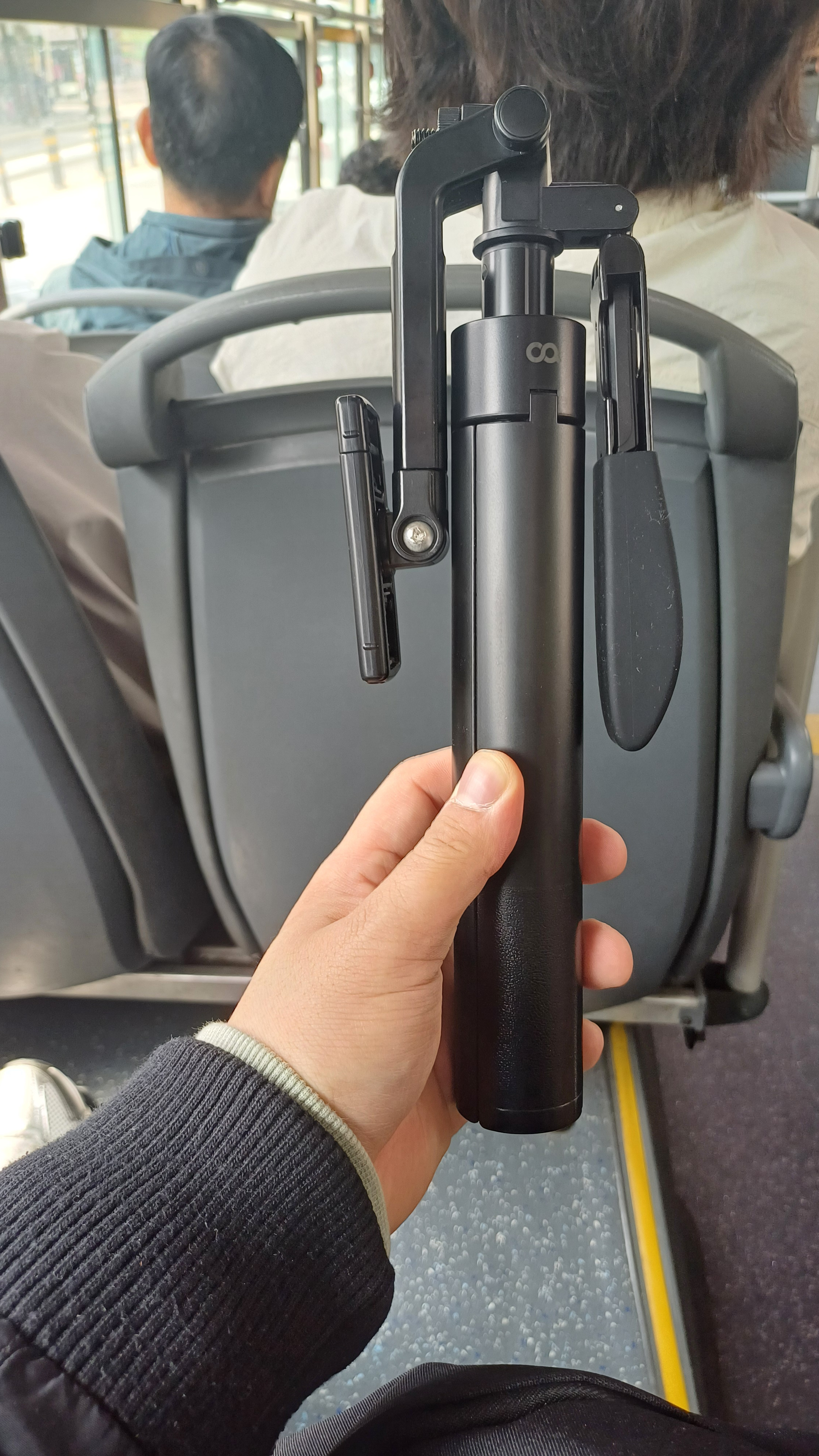
Bluetooth selfie stick

A selfie stick is used to take photographs or video by positioning a digital camera device, typically a smartphone, beyond the normal range of the arm. This allows for shots to be taken at angles and distances that would not have been possible with the human arm by itself. The sticks are typically extensible, with a handle on one end and an adjustable clamp on the other end to hold the device in place. As their name suggests, they are most commonly used for taking selfies with camera phones.

Some are connected to a smartphone via its jack plug, while others are tethered using Bluetooth controls. The connection between the device and the selfie stick lets the user decide when to take the picture or start recording a video by clicking a button located on the handle. Models designed for compact cameras have a mirror behind the viewscreen so that the shot can be lined up.

In contrast to a monopod for stabilising a camera on the ground, a selfie stick's arm is thickest and strongest at the opposite end from the camera in order to provide better grip and balance when held aloft. Safety concerns and the inconvenience the product causes to others have resulted in them being banned at many venues, including all Disney Parks as well as both Universal Orlando Resort and Hollywood.

== History ==
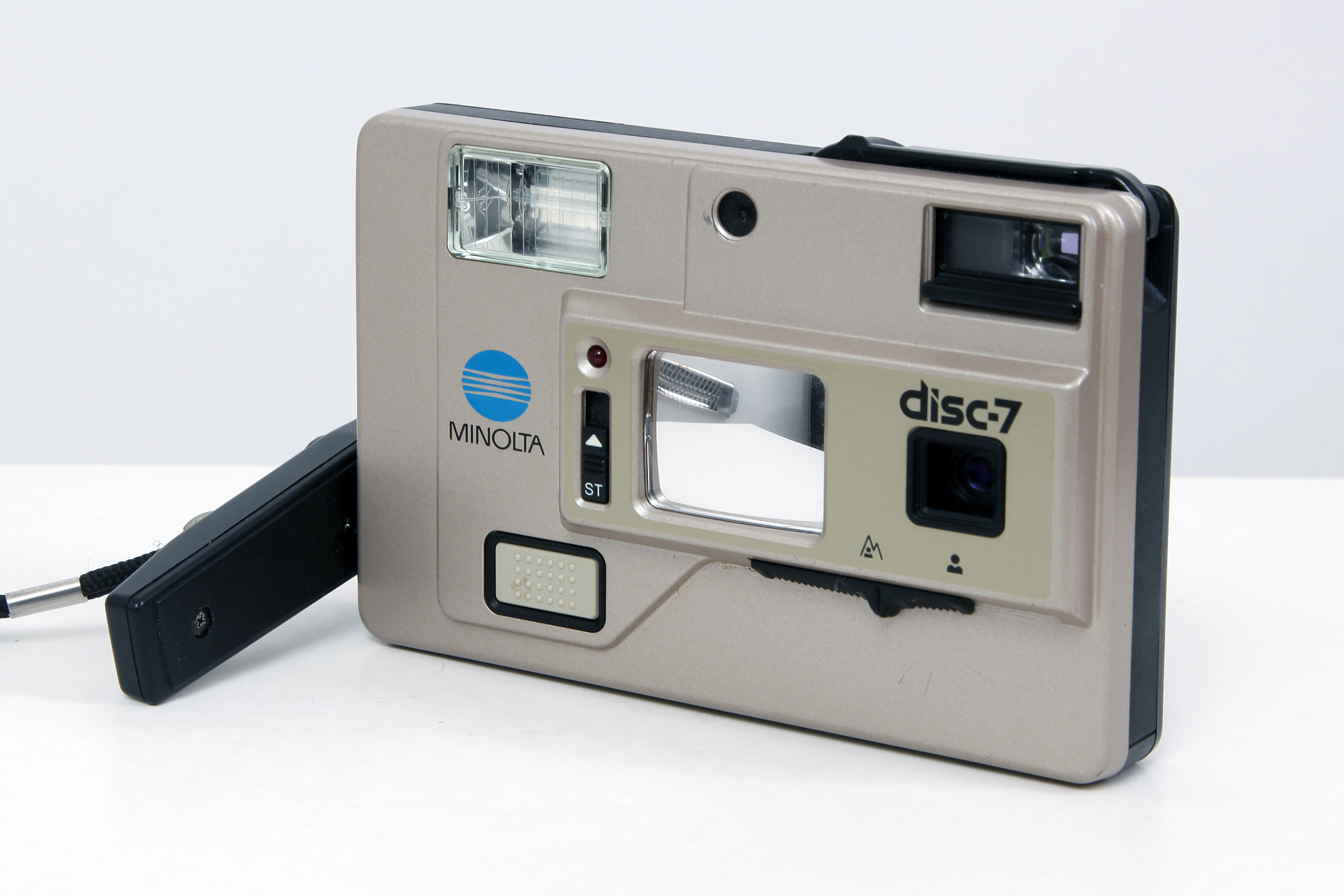
MINOLTA disc-7 with selfie mirror

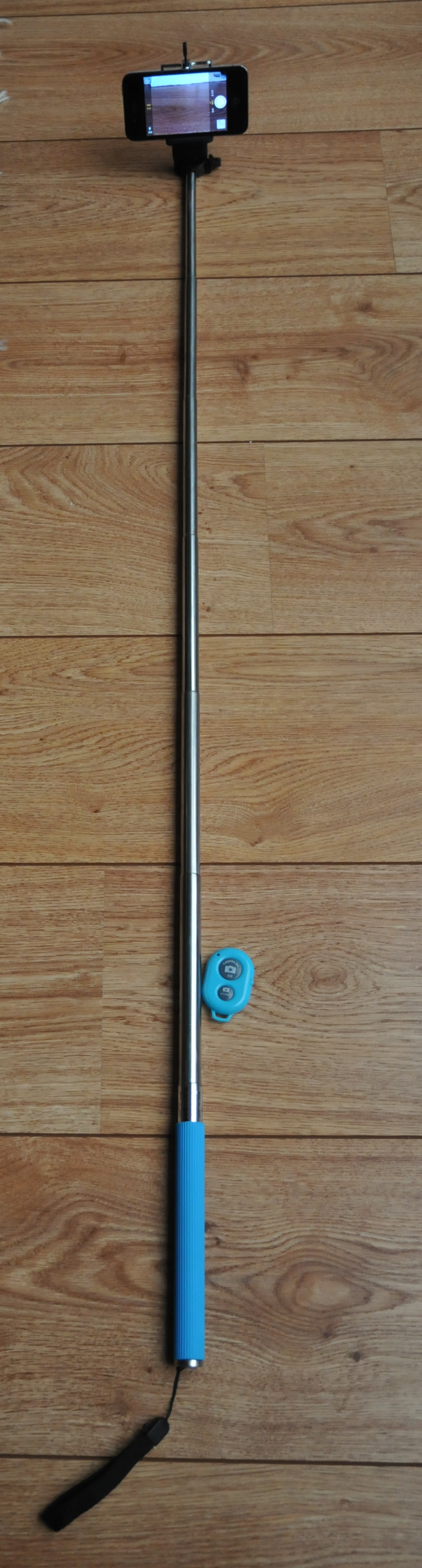
A fully extended selfie stick with a smartphone attached

A photo from 1925 shows a man taking a picture of himself and his wife with a long out-of-frame stick pointed at the camera. Amateur box cameras of the period could not have captured a self-portrait in focus when held at arm's length, requiring photographers to use remote shutter devices such as cables or sticks.

A device which has been likened to the selfie stick appears in the 1969 Czechoslovak sci-fi film I Killed Einstein, Gentlemen. One character holds a silver stick in front of herself and another character, smiles at the end of the stick as it produces a camera flash, and immediately unfurls a printed photograph of the pair from the stick's handle.

The 1983 Minolta Disc-7 camera had a convex mirror on its front to allow the composition of self-portraits, and its packaging showed the camera mounted on a stick while used for such a purpose. A "telescopic extender" for compact handheld cameras was patented by Ueda Hiroshi and Mima Yujiro in 1983, and a Japanese selfie stick was featured in a 1995 book of "101 Un-Useless Japanese Inventions". While dismissed as a "useless invention" at the time, the selfie stick later gained global popularity in the 21st century.

Canadian inventor Wayne Fromm patented his Quik Pod in 2005 and becoming commercially available in the United States the following year. In 2012, Yeong-Ming Wang filed a patent for a "multi-axis omni-directional shooting extender" capable of holding a smartphone, which won a silver medal at the 2013 Concours Lepine. The term "selfie stick" did not become widely used until 2014. Extended forms of selfie sticks can hold laptop computers to take selfies from a webcam. By the fall of 2015 technology news noted that there was a large variety of selfie sticks available on the market; Molly McCugh of Wired magazine wrote in October 2015, "Some are very, very long; some aren't so long; some are bedazzled. Some look like hands. Some are spoons. But they are all, at the end of the day, one thing: A stick that takes selfies."

The selfie stick was listed in Time magazine's 25 best inventions of 2014, while the New York Post named the selfie stick the most controversial gift of 2014. At the end of December 2014, Bloomberg News noted that selfie sticks had ruled the 2014 holiday season as the “must-have” gift of the year. The selfie stick has been criticized for its association with the perceived narcissism and self-absorption of contemporary society, with commentators in 2015 dubbing the tool the "Narcisstick" or "Wand of Narcissus". In November 2015, The Atlantic conducted a survey of Silicon Valley insiders which named the selfie stick as one of two technologies that tech leaders would most like to "un-invent" with the only invention on the same level being nuclear weapons. Despite various bans, selfie sticks proved so popular that a selfie stick store was opened in Times Square during the summer of 2015. In 2016 it was reported that Coca-Cola had created a "selfie bottle" with an attached camera that takes pictures when it is tipped for drinking.

== Usage ==
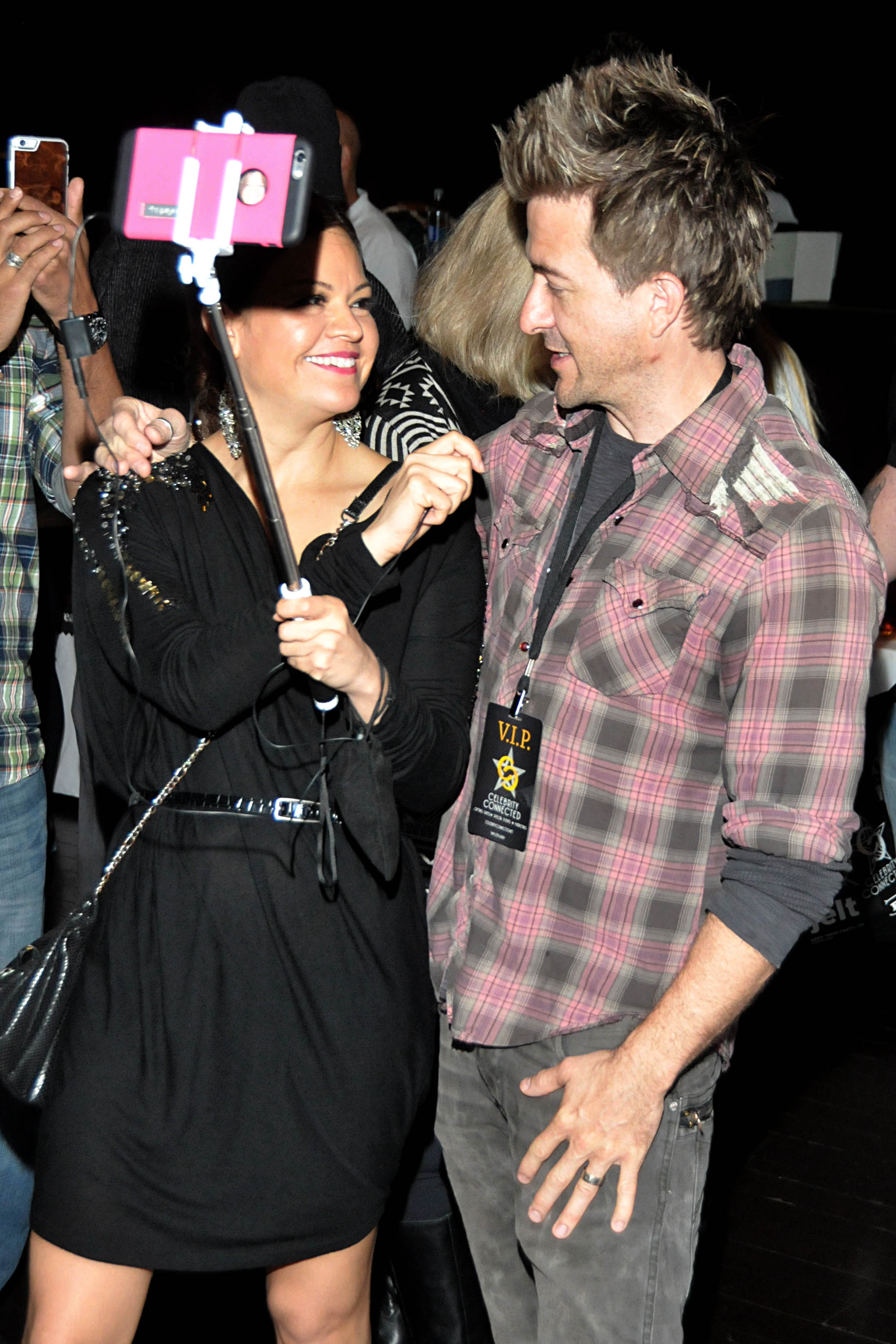
Reporter Vanessa Lua using a selfie stick instead of a camera operator for an interview with Jeremy Kent Jackson from The Disney Sitcom Lab Rats

One is able to attach their device to the end of the selfie stick and then extend it beyond the normal reach of the arm. Different models of stick are triggered in various ways, such as pressing a button on the stick handle which is connected to the device (usually using the jack plug), pressing a button on a wireless remote (often via Bluetooth), using the camera's built-in timer, or making a sound the device can detect to start recording a video or taking a picture.

The smartphone's physical means of triggering the camera, such as the sound volume controls or the touchscreen camera button of the device, are replicated on headphones with on-cord controls. When selfie sticks are plugged into the jack plug, they are seen by the device as headphones.

The selfie stick gives more practical use in situations that require assistance for taking photos/videos at difficult angles that need to be taken from an extended, elevated distance beyond the arm's reach. It allows the user to take photos and videos in otherwise dangerous or impossible situations, such as recording footage inside a very deep hole, over a cliff, or simply at an angle that is too far away from the user.

On social media, you can see videos of people walking, roller-skating, or cycling while filming themselves. If the person's shadow is visible, you might be surprised to find that the selfie stick does not appear in it. This is because most modern action or selfie cameras capable of hiding the stick—such as the Insta360 or GoPro Max—feature two lenses that each capture a 180-degree field of view. The stick is positioned exactly at the junction between these two lenses, within the camera's natural "blind spot." When the camera's software stitches the two images together into a seamless video, the stick is completely removed from the footage.

== Bans and restrictions ==
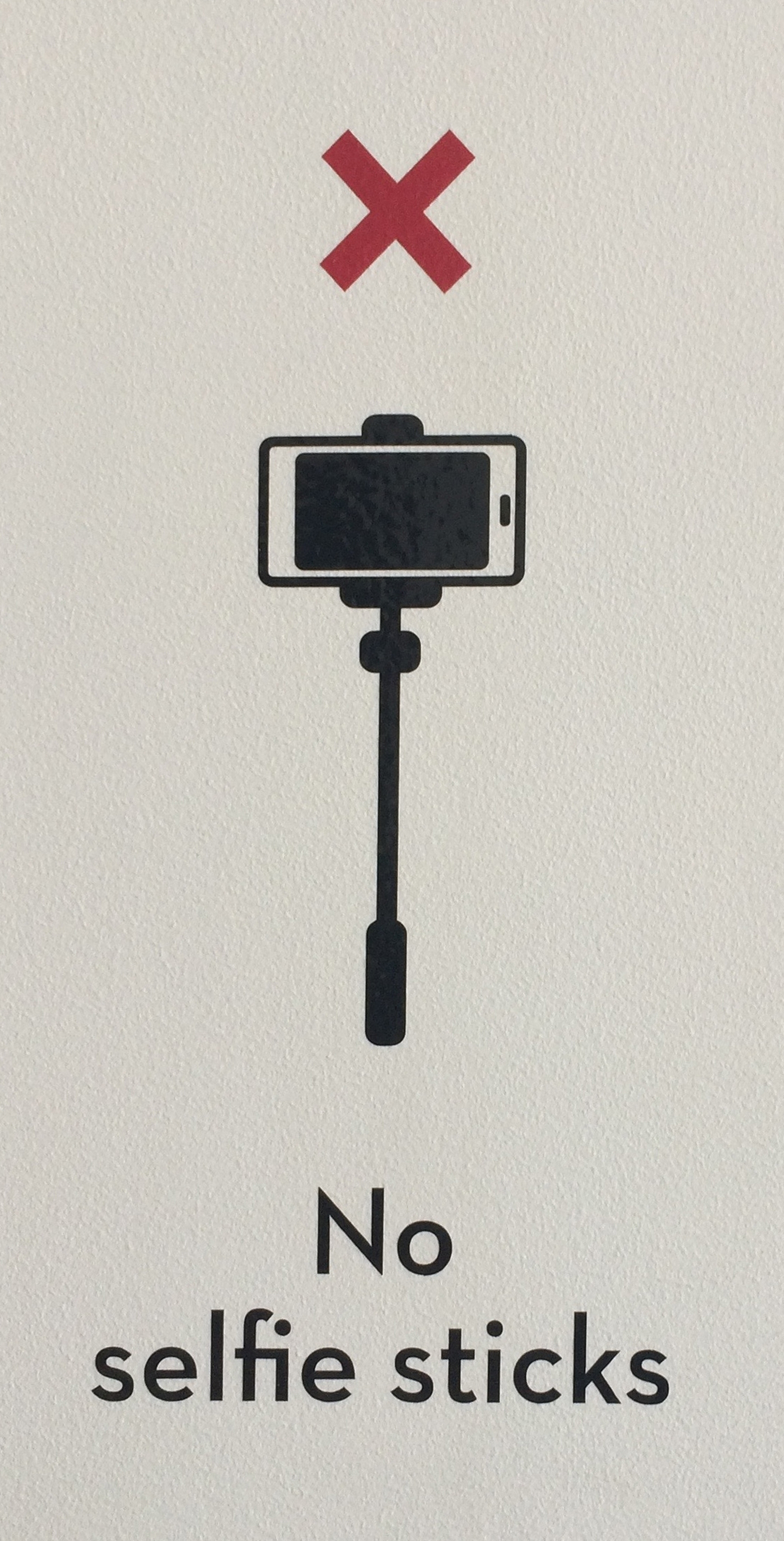
A "no selfie sticks" sign at the Museum of Brisbane, 2015

Despite the selfie stick being a popular item among tourists and families, bans and restrictions on its use have been imposed across a range of public venues generally on the grounds of safety and inconvenience to others.

Concert venues and some music festivals in the United States, Australia and the United Kingdom have banned the use of selfie sticks. Organisers have cited their role in the illegal recording of bands' sets, and the inconvenience and safety issues to fellow audience members.

Museums, galleries and historical sites such as the Palace of Versailles have banned the sticks because of concerns about possible damage to priceless artworks and other objects.

Theme parks, including Disneyland Resort, Walt Disney World Resort, Tokyo Disney Resort, Disneyland Paris, Hong Kong Disneyland, Shanghai Disneyland, Six Flags, Universal Orlando, and Universal Studios Hollywood have banned selfie sticks. The sticks have always been banned on rides at Disney World for safety reasons, but after a number of instances where rides had to be stopped because of a guest pulling out a selfie stick in mid-ride, such as incidents on California Screamin' and Big Thunder Mountain Railroad, Disney issued a park-wide ban on the accessories.

Sporting events have banned selfie sticks both for their "nuisance value" and for interfering with other spectators' enjoyment or view. The Australia Tour Down Under banned the devices citing "harm to cyclists, officials and yourself". Emirates Stadium, home of the Arsenal Football Club, bans "any object that could be used as a weapon or could compromise public safety", and regards selfie sticks as such an item.

In 2014, South Korea's radio management agency issued regulations banning sale of unregistered selfie sticks that use Bluetooth technology to trigger the camera, as any such device sold in South Korea is considered a "telecommunications device" and must be tested by and registered with the agency. In 2015, Apple banned selfie sticks from a WWDC Developers Conference, though no explicit reason was given.

== See also ==
- List of selfie-related injuries and deaths
- Gimbal § Photography and imaging
