= OOL =

OOL may refer to:

== Science and technology ==
- Object-oriented language, a programming paradigm
- Origin of life (OoL), also called Abiogenesis
- Out-of-the-loop performance problem, a consequence of automation

== Others ==
- Gold Coast Airport (IATA code) in Gold Coast, Queensland, Australia
- Olivia O'Leary, Irish journalist, writer and current affairs presenter
- Optimum Online, an Internet service provider in the United States
