= Frequency following response =

Neural phenomenon

The frequency following response (FFR), also referred to as frequency following potential (FFP) is an evoked potential generated by periodic or nearly-periodic auditory stimuli. Part of the auditory brainstem response (ABR), the FFR reflects sustained neural activity integrated over a population of neural elements: "the brainstem response...can be divided into transient and sustained portions, namely the onset response and the frequency-following response (FFR)". It is often phase-locked to the individual cycles of the stimulus waveform and/or the envelope of the periodic stimuli. It has not been well studied with respect to its clinical utility, although it can be used as part of a test battery for helping to diagnose auditory neuropathy. This may be in conjunction with, or as a replacement for, otoacoustic emissions.

== History ==
In 1930, Wever and Bray discovered a potential called the "Wever-Bray effect". They originally believed that the potential originated from the cochlear nerve, but it was later discovered that the response is non-neural and is cochlear in origin, specifically from the outer hair cells. This phenomenon came to be known as the cochlear microphonic (CM). The FFR may have been accidentally discovered back in 1930; however, renewed interest in defining the FFR did not occur until the mid-1960s. While several researchers raced to publish the first detailed account of the FFR, the term "FFR" was originally coined by Worden and Marsh in 1968, to describe the CM-like neural components recorded directly from several brainstem nuclei (research based on Jewett and Williston's work on click ABR's).

== Stimulus parameters ==
The recording procedures for the scalp-recorded FFR are essentially the same as the ABR. A montage of three electrodes is typically utilized: An active electrode, located either at the top of the head or top of the forehead, a reference electrode, located on an earlobe, mastoid, or high vertebra, and a ground electrode, located either on the other earlobe or in the middle of the forehead. The FFR can be evoked to sinusoids, complex tones, steady-state vowels, tonal sweeps, or consonant-vowel syllables. The duration of those stimuli is generally between 15 and 150 milliseconds, with a rise time of 5 milliseconds.

The polarity of successive stimuli can be either fixed or alternating. There are many reasons for, and effects of, alternating polarity. When stimulus delivery technology is not properly shielded, the electromagnetic acoustic transducer may induce the stimulus directly into the electrodes. This is known as a stimulus artifact, and researchers and clinicians seek to avoid it, as it is a contamination of the true recorded response of the nervous system. If stimulus polarities alternate, and responses are averaged over both polarities, stimulus artifact can be guaranteed to be absent. This is because the artifact changes polarity with the physical stimuli, and thus will average to nearly zero over time. Direct physiological responses to the stimuli such as the CM, however, also alternate polarity with the stimuli and will also be absent. Subtracting the responses to the two polarities yields the portions of the signal canceled out in the average. Such decomposition of the responses is not readily possible if the stimuli have constant polarity.

== Clinical applicability ==
Due to the lack of specificity at low levels, the FFR has yet to make its way into clinical settings. Only recently has the FFR been evaluated for encoding complex sound and binaural processing. There may be uses for the information the FFR can provide regarding steady state, time-variant, and speech signals for better understanding of individuals with hearing loss and its effects and of people with psychopathology. FFR distortion products (FFR DPs) could supplement low frequency (< 1000 Hz) DPOAEs. FFRs have the potential to be used to evaluate the neural representation of speech sounds processed by different strategies employed by users of cochlear implants, primarily identification and discrimination of speech. Also, phase-locked neural activity reflected in the FFR has been successfully used to predict auditory thresholds.

== Research directions ==
Currently, there is renewed interest in using the FFR to evaluate: the role of neural phase-locking in encoding of complex sounds in normally hearing and hearing impaired subjects, encoding of voice pitch, binaural hearing, and evaluating the characteristics of the neural version of cochlear nonlinearity. Furthermore, it is demonstrated that the temporal pattern of phase-locked brainstem neural activity generating the FFR may contain information relevant to the binaural processes underlying spatial release from masking (SRM) in challenging listening environments.
