= Computer says no =

Catchphrase about decision making

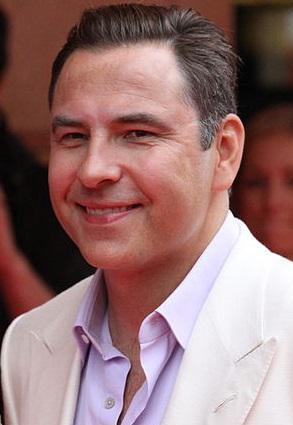
David Walliams played Carol Beer, who used the catchphrase "computer says no" on Little Britain.

"Computer says no" is a catchphrase associated with the British sketch comedy television programme Little Britain in 2004. The phrase predates Little Britain – for instance, in the title of a segment in 1970 East German anthology film Our Time and on the American TV series Hill Street Blues in 1981. In British culture, the phrase is used to criticise public-facing organisations and customer service staff who rely on information stored on or generated by a computer to make decisions and respond to customers' requests, often in a manner which goes against common sense. It may also refer to a deliberately unhelpful attitude towards customers and service-users commonly experienced within British society, whereby more could be done to reach a mutually satisfactory outcome, but is not.

== Little Britain ==
In Little Britain, "Computer says no" is the catchphrase of Carol Beer (played by David Walliams), a bank worker and later holiday rep and hospital receptionist, who always responds to a customer's enquiry by typing it into her computer and responding with "Computer says no" to even the most reasonable of requests. When asked to do something aside from asking the computer, she would shrug and remain obstinate in her unhelpfulness, and ultimately cough in the customer's face. The phrase was also used in the Australian soap opera Neighbours in 2006 as a reference to Little Britain.

The catchphrase returns in Little Brexit, where Carol is still working at Sunsearchers as a holiday rep, confronted by a woman wanting to go to Europe. Carol uses the paraphrase "Brexit Says No", when the woman wants to go to France, Spain and Italy.

== Usage ==
The "Computer says no" attitude often comes from larger companies that rely on information stored electronically. When this information is not updated, it can often lead to refusals of financial products or incorrect information being sent out to customers. These situations can often be resolved by an employee updating the information; however, when this cannot be done easily, the "Computer says no" attitude can be viewed as becoming prevalent when there is unhelpfulness as a result. This attitude can also occur when an employee fails to read human emotion in the customer and reacts according to his or her professional training or relies upon a script. This attitude also crops up when larger companies rely on computer credit scores and do not meet with a customer to discuss his or her individual needs, instead basing a decision upon information stored in computers. Some organisations attempt to offset this attitude by moving away from reliance on electronic information and using a human approach towards requests.

"Computer says no" happens in a more literal sense when computer systems employ filters that prevent messages being passed along, as when these messages are perceived to include obscenities. When information is not passed through to the person operating the computer, decisions may be made without seeing the whole picture.

The musician Jesca Hoop used the phrase in her 2017 song "Animal Kingdom Chaotic"; Pitchfork commented that "Computer screens, the implication goes, have turned us into a population of proxies who simulate doing things more than we actually do things." In 2025, the former tennis player Pat Cash used the phrase to criticise failures of Electronic line judges at the 2025 Wimbledon Championships.

== See also ==
- Automation bias
- Computers Don't Argue
- Jobsworth
- Garbage in, garbage out
