= Death of Arina Glazunova =

2023 death of a Russian influencer in Tbilisi, Georgia

Coordinates: 41°42′12.3″N 44°47′33.9″E

Arina Glazunova
- Арина Глазунова
- Born: 13 February 2000; Moscow, Russia
- Died: 27 September 2024 (aged 24); Tbilisi, Georgia

During the early hours of 27 September 2024, in Tbilisi, Georgia, Arina Glazunova, a 24-year-old Russian influencer, died after falling into an underground subway passage while taking a selfie video singing a Russian cover of "For The Last Time (Vesyolye Rebyata song)". The accident received wide attention online and sparked conversations about infrastructure safety in Tbilisi.

== Background ==
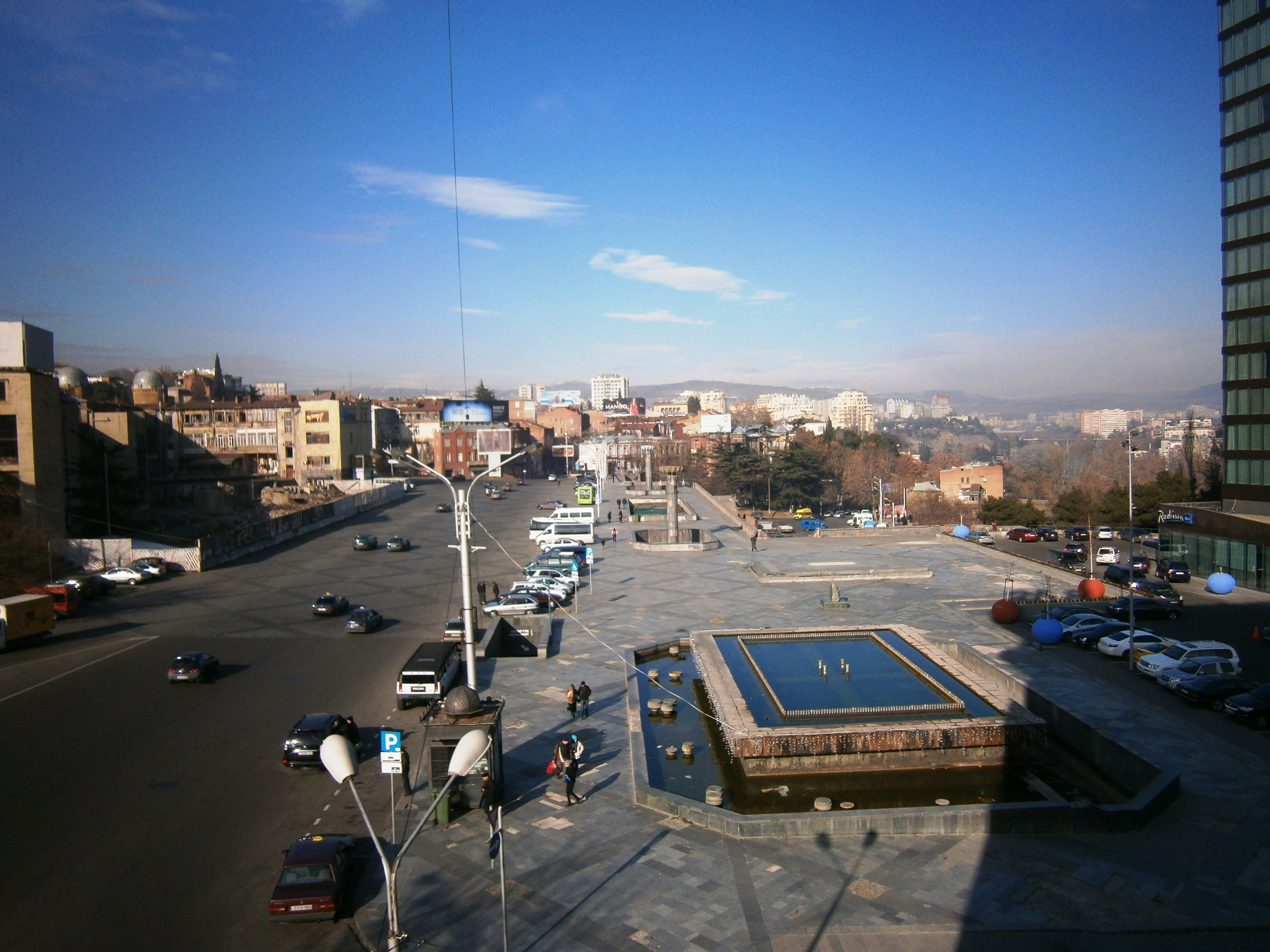
Overhead view of First Republic Square in 2012, where Glazunova fell; the subway passage is toward the middle of the picture, directly behind the street light

Arina Glazunova (Russian: Арина Глазунова) was born on 13 February 2000 in Moscow and was a graduate of the Russian Academy of National Economy and Public Administration. Glazunova travelled to visit friends in Tbilisi, before her fatal accident. Around 2:30 a.m. on 27 September 2024, Glazunova was walking with a friend through First Republic Square in the city center, singing the song "For The Last Time" while filming the walk on her phone. Glazunova failed to notice the edge of the underpass and tripped into it backwards, falling from a height of 5 metres (16 ft). She was taken to the hospital with numerous fractures, including the base of her skull, and died the same day.

=== Aftermath ===
The incident caused a wide resonance online after the video of her death was shared. At the site of Glazunova's fall, a spontaneous memorial was organized with flowers in memory of the deceased. Local residents started a discussion on social networks about the underpass. According to them, the lack of a fence threatens the lives of other passers-by. Some Internet users noted that the crossing is not fenced in any way and said that if no action is taken, the tragedy could happen again. The edge of the subway passage was only 30 centimeters tall at the time of the incident.

Glazunova's funeral was held at Vagankovsky cemetery in Moscow. Prior to her funeral, Glazunova's parents traveled to Georgia to repatriate her body to Russia. Later, a barrier was installed in the location of her fall to prevent a similar accident from happening again.

== See also ==
- List of selfie-related injuries and deaths
