= Death by GPS =

Deaths following satellite navigation

Death by GPS refers to the death of people attributable, in part, to following GPS directions or GPS maps. Death by GPS has been noted in several deaths in Death Valley, California, a lost hiker at Joshua Tree National Park in southeastern California, and incidents in Washington state, Australia, England, Italy, and Brazil.

== Causes ==
There are multiple reasons why people following GPS directions have become lost, been injured, or died. The reasons listed below may also include the lack of a working communications systems to call for help. Thus, drivers or hikers have ventured off the road or into remote, impassable, or dangerous areas. They could also drive on GPS until their vehicles were out of fuel, mired, or disabled; succumbed to hazardous climate or weather conditions, or become lost.

- Uncritical acceptance of turn-by-turn commands, paying more attention to the navigation system than what was in front of them, such as road signs and signals, barriers, and terrain
- Unfamiliarity with or unawareness of hazardous conditions not noted by GPS (e.g., the local climate or weather conditions, construction, or closed, impassable, or dangerous roads)
- Lack of a current, accurate written map or written directions to use in concert with or in lieu of those provided by GPS
- Outdated or incorrect GPS maps
- The GPS directions may reflect the shortest distance between locations, regardless of whether or not the route is navigable

Allen Lin, in research published in 2017, provided a systematic analysis of the key themes in these incidents and the roles that navigation technologies played in them.

== Proposed solutions ==
Matthew McKenzie offers some precautions against death by GPS: "Use GPS and other mobile devices the way they should be used: as simple conveniences. Carry a real map, understand the local climate, and don't hesitate to turn around and go back the way you came if your directions don't 'feel' right." The National Park Service has posted the following message on the Directions & Transportation page of the official Death Valley Park website:

Using GPS Navigation

GPS Navigation to remote locations like Death Valley are notoriously unreliable. Numerous travelers have been directed to the wrong location or even dead-end or closed roads. Travelers should always carry up-to-date road maps to check the accuracy of GPS directions.

DO NOT DEPEND ONLY ON YOUR VEHICLE GPS NAVIGATION SYSTEM.

== Incidents ==
- In March 2011, a couple from British Columbia died after being led off course by their GPS in northern Nevada.
- In September 2022, a North Carolina man died after a GPS led him to a defunct bridge that dropped off into a creek.

== See also ==
- Automation bias
- James Kim, American man who died stranded on a mountain road after following directions on a paper road map
- Incidents relating to Pokémon Go
- List of selfie-related injuries and deaths
