= Garbage in, garbage out =

Phrase used in computer science

In computer science, garbage in, garbage out (GIGO) is the concept that flawed, biased or poor quality (garbage) information or input produces a result or output of similar ("garbage") quality. The saying points to the need to improve data quality in, for example, programming. Rubbish in, rubbish out (RIRO) is an alternate wording.

The principle applies to all logical argumentation: soundness implies validity, but validity does not imply soundness. In other words, assumptions matter: even if the argument’s form is perfectly logical, if the assumptions are false from the start, a false result is the likely outcome.

== History ==
The term may have been derived from similar formal terms for data structures last-in, first-out (LIFO) or first-in, first-out (FIFO).

It is credited to George Fuechsel, an early IBM programmer, who introduced it in the late 1950s. For a wider public it was introduced a 1957 syndicated newspaper article about US Army mathematicians and their work with early computers, in which an Army Specialist named William D. Mellin explained that computers cannot think for themselves, and that "sloppily programmed" inputs inevitably lead to incorrect outputs. The underlying principle was noted by the inventor of the first programmable computing device design:

On two occasions I have been asked, "Pray, Mr. Babbage, if you put into the machine wrong figures, will the right answers come out?" ... I am not able rightly to apprehend the kind of confusion of ideas that could provoke such a question.

— Charles Babbage, Passages from the Life of a Philosopher

== Uses ==
This phrase can be used as an explanation for the poor quality of a digitized audio or video file. Although digitizing can be the first step in cleaning up a signal, it does not, by itself, improve the quality. Defects in the original analog signal will be faithfully recorded, but might be identified and removed by a subsequent step by digital signal processing.

GIGO is also used to describe failures in human decision-making due to faulty, incomplete, or imprecise data.

In audiology, GIGO describes the process that occurs at the dorsal cochlear nucleus (DCN) when auditory neuropathy spectrum disorder is present. This occurs when the neural firing from the cochlea has become unsynchronized, resulting in a static-filled sound being input into the DCN and then passed up the chain to the auditory cortex. The term was applied by Dan Schwartz at the 2012 Worldwide ANSD Conference, St. Petersburg, Florida, on 16 March 2012; and adopted as industry jargon to describe the electrical signal received by the DCN and passed up the auditory chain to the superior olivary complex on the way to the auditory cortex destination.

GIGO was the name of a Usenet gateway program to FidoNet, MAUSnet, e.a.

The phrase may also be used in the context of machine learning, where poor-quality training data will inevitably lead to a poor-quality model.

== See also ==
- Algorithmic bias
- Auditory neuropathy spectrum disorder
- Computer says no
- Data processing inequality
- FINO
- Model collapse
- No free lunch theorem
- Standard error
- Undefined behavior
