= Auditory neuropathy =

Hearing disorder

Auditory neuropathy (AN) is a hearing disorder in which the outer hair cells of the cochlea are present and functional, but sound information is not transmitted sufficiently by the auditory nerve to the brain. The cause may be several dysfunctions of the inner hair cells of the cochlea or spiral ganglion neuron levels. Hearing loss with AN can range from normal hearing sensitivity to profound hearing loss.

A neuropathy usually refers to a disease of the peripheral nerve or nerves, but the auditory nerve itself is not always affected in auditory neuropathy spectrum disorders. Prevalence in the population is relatively unknown. Neonates with high risk factors for hearing loss have a prevalence of up to 40% (Vignesh, Jaya, & Muraleedharan 2016). These high-risk factors are: hypoxia, low birth weight, premature birth, hyperbilirubinemia, jaundice, and aminoglycoside antibiotic treatments (NIDCD, 2018).

== Possible sites of lesion ==
Hair cell
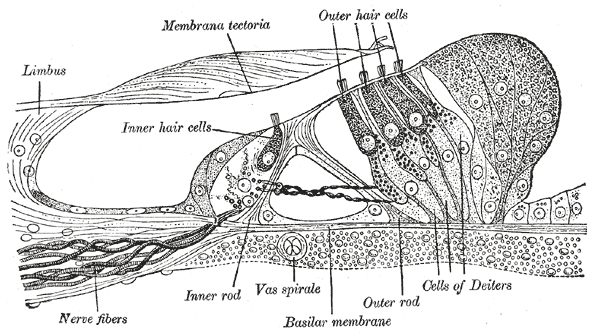
- Three rows of outer hair cells in the organ of Corti, one row of inner hair cells.

Identifiers
- MeSH: C538268

Based on clinical testing of subjects with auditory neuropathy, the disruption in the stream of sound information has been localized to one or more of three probable locations: the inner hair cells of the cochlea, the synapse between the inner hair cells and the auditory nerve, or a lesion of the ascending auditory nerve itself.

== Diagnosing auditory neuropathy ==
Diagnosis is possible after a test battery, that must necessarily include the following: the auditory brainstem response and otoacoustic emissions. Auditory brainstem response should be tested with both polarities (helps in identifying cochlear microphonics).

Auditory neuropathy can be diagnosed with a battery of tests including otoacoustic emissions (OAE), auditory brainstem response (ABR), and acoustic reflexes. The classic AN paradigm would include present OAEs indicating normal outer hair cell function, absent or abnormal ABR with presence of the cochlear microphonic, and absent acoustic reflexes. Other tests would include pure-tone and speech audiometry. AN patients can have a range of hearing thresholds with difficulty in speech perception. Patients with auditory neuropathy spectrum disorders have to date never been shown to have normal middle ear muscle reflexes at 95 dB HL or less despite having normal otoacoustic emissions.

Auditory neuropathy can occur spontaneously, or in combination with diseases like Charcot-Marie-Tooth disease and Friedreich's ataxia. AN can have either congenital or acquired causes. AN can be due to genetic factors in syndromic, non-syndromic, and mitochondrial related patterns. Approximately 40% of AN cases are estimated to have a genetic cause.

It appears that regardless of the audiometric pattern (hearing thresholds) or of their function on traditional speech testing in quiet the vast majority of those affected have very poor hearing in background noise situations.

== Residual auditory function ==
When testing the auditory system, there is no characteristic presentation on the audiogram.

When diagnosing a patient with auditory neuropathy, there is no characteristic level of functioning either. Patients can present with relatively little dysfunction other than problems of hearing speech in noise, or can present as completely deaf and gaining no useful information from auditory signals.

Hearing aids are sometimes prescribed, with mixed success. FM systems in combination with hearing aids or cochlear implants could increase success of these amplification devices. Some people with auditory neuropathy obtain cochlear implants, also with mixed success.

== Screening ==
Universal newborn hearing screenings are mandated in a majority of the United States. These screenings include OAE testing – otoacoustic emissions, which are sounds generated from the cochlea transmitted across the middle ear to the external ear canal, where they can be recorded. It assesses functionality of the cochlea, but not the auditory nerve. An ABR (auditory brainstem response) is required to assess that the sound is successfully transmitted through the nerve to the brain. In most parts of Australia, hearing screening via ABR testing is mandated, meaning that essentially all congenital (i.e., not those related to later onset degenerative disorders) auditory neuropathy cases should be diagnosed at birth.

Auditory neuropathy is sometimes difficult to catch right away, even with these precautions in place. Parental suspicion of a hearing loss is a trustworthy screening tool for hearing loss, too; if it is suspected, that is sufficient reason to seek a hearing evaluation from an audiologist.

== See also ==
- Auditory neuropathy spectrum disorder
- Auditory processing disorder
- Cochlear implant
- Sensorineural hearing impairment
