= Wayne Fromm =

Canadian inventor (born 1964)

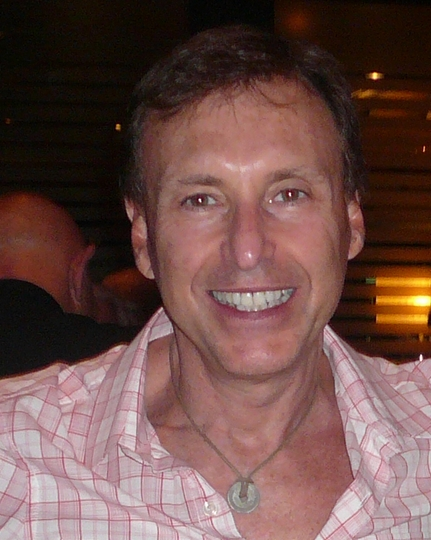
- Born: December 27, 1964 (age 61); Toronto, Ontario
- Education: University of Toronto; University of Southern California
- Occupation: Inventor
- Known for: The selfie stick or selfie pole
- Title: President of Fromm Works
- Website: www.frommworks.com

Wayne Fromm is a Canadian inventor and entrepreneur who is most notable for being the original patent holder of the selfie stick for digital cameras and cell phones. Branded as the Quik Pod, it is a handheld extendable stick for digital cameras and smart phones for taking pictures of one's self.

== Biography ==
Wayne Fromm studied commerce and finance at the University of Toronto from 1982 to 1983. Subsequently in 1985, he received a Bachelor of Arts in Psychology at York University in Toronto, Canada. Through his company Fromm Works, he has invented numerous inventions and his activities have been mentioned in notable media like the Entrepreneur Magazine, Inventor's Digest, Harvard Business Review, The Wall Street Journal, Investor's Daily News, CNN, Business Week, Toronto Star, Financial Post, Globe and Mail, New York Post and CTV Biography. During his career, he created devices like the Quik Pod which appeared in Oprah Magazine and the New York Times in March 2008. Disney's Beauty and the Beast Magic Talking Mirror, Crayola's Colour and Show Projector, Saban's Power Ranger Room Defender, Nestle's Nesquik Magic Milkshake Maker. The following patents below are credited to Wayne Fromm and describe some of his inventions:

- US patent 7684694, Wayne G. Fromm, "Apparatus for supporting a camera and method for using the apparatus", published 2010-03-23, issued 2010-03-23
- US patent 8757901, Wayne G. Fromm, "Camera steadying device", published 2014-06-24, issued 2014-06-24
- US patent 6283627, Wayne G. Fromm, "Drink mixer", published 2001-09-04, issued 2001-09-04
- US patent D485118, Wayne G. Fromm, "Blender", published 2004-01-13, issued 2004-01-13
- US patent 20040140348, Wayne G. Fromm, "Pedometer", published 2004-07-22, issued 2004-07-22
- US patent 5228879, Wayne G. Fromm, "Toy mirror assembly", published 1993-07-20, issued 2012-03-06
- US patent 9386196, Wayne G. Fromm, "Holding Assembly for a Picture Taking Device", published 2013-12-31, issued 2016-07-05

== See also ==
- Tripod
- List of people from Toronto
