= Out-of-the-loop performance problem =

The out-of-the-loop performance problem (OOL or OOTL) arises when an operator suffers from a decrement in performance as a consequence of automation. Potential loss of skills and of situation awareness due to complacency and a lack of vigilance can make operators of automated systems unable to operate manually in case of a system failure. For example, automatic train operation reduces the manual operation of trains and can result in this problem for train drivers.

Highly automated systems reduce the operator to a monitoring role, which gives an operator fewer chances to understand the system.

== Etymology ==
OOL is also known as out-of-the-loop syndrome and the out-of-the-loop effect. One of the first mentions of the term is found in a patent by Willard Meilander from Goodyear Aerospace Corporation for automated aircraft control in 1972. Other early mentions of OOL come up in the context of flight automation in the 1980s.

== Consequences ==
The Three Mile Island accident in 1979, USAir Flight 5050 crash in 1989, Air France Flight 447 crash in 2009 and Knight Capital Group stock trading disruption in 2012 can all be attributed to OOL.

== See also ==
- Automation bias
- Mind-wandering
