= Hulivana =

Village in India

Hulivana is a village in Mandya Taluk in Mandya District of Karnataka State in southwest India.

== Geography ==
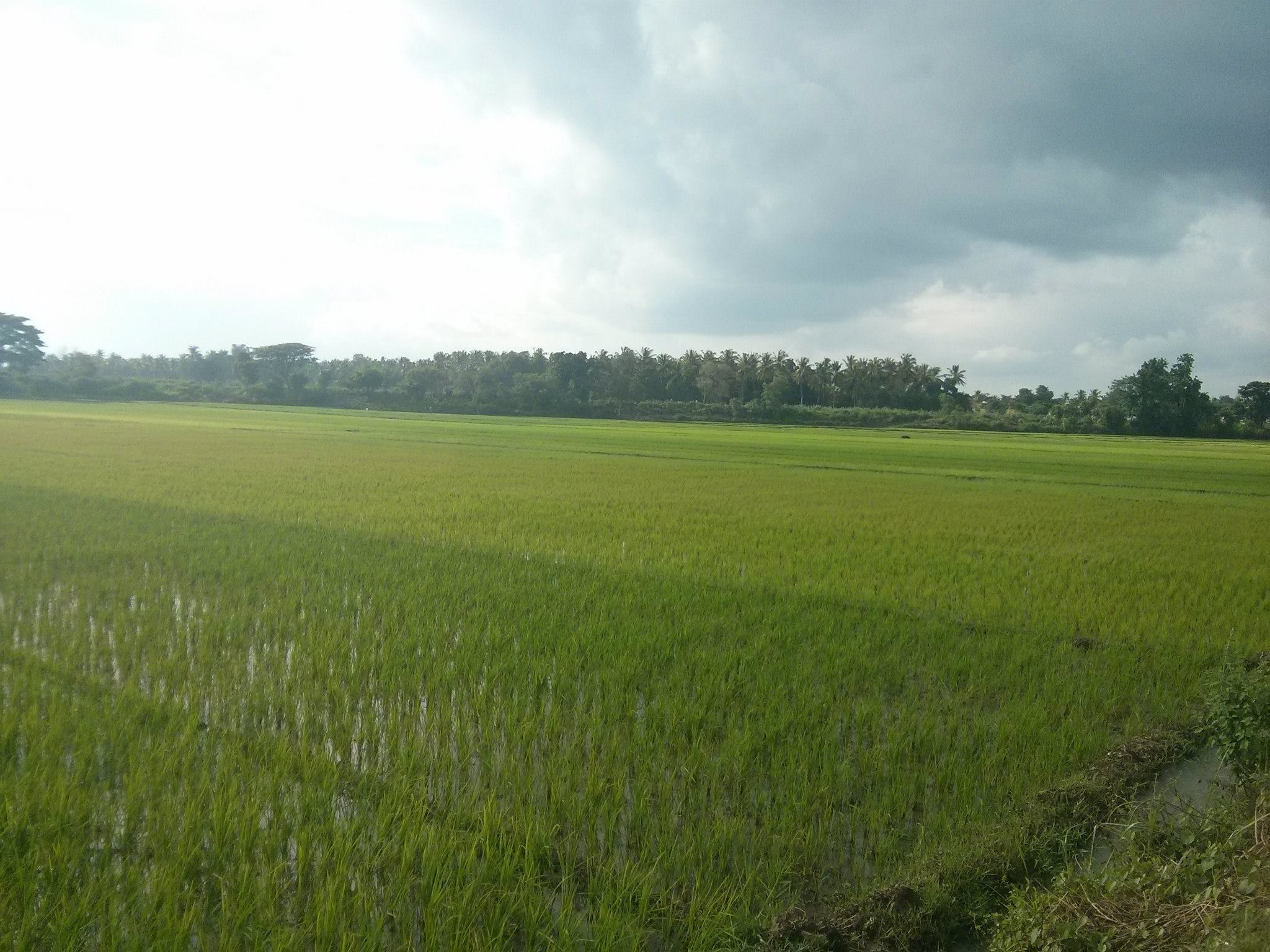

Hulivana is located 7 km north of the district capital Mandya, 3 km from Mandya Rural, and 100 km from Bangalore.

H.malligere ( 3 km), B.hosur ( 3 km), Ummadahalli ( 4 km), Keelara ( 4 km), Gopalapura ( 5 km) are nearby villages. Hulivana is surrounded by Maddur Taluk to the East, Shrirangapattana Taluk to the South, Pandavapura Taluk to the west and Malvalli Taluk to the South.

The nearest cities are Mandya, Maddur, Shrirangapattana and Malavalli.

== Demographics ==
The population is 5000+. The female population is 50.0%. The literacy rate is 61.7% and the female literacy rate is 23.8%.

The Scheduled Tribes population is 1.0%, the Scheduled Caste population is 19.8%. The working population is 47.6. The 0 -6 population is 346, with 48.6% girls.

== Politics ==
JD(S) is the major political party in this area.

== Transport ==
=== Rail ===
Mandya railway station and Hanakere railway stations are the nearest to Hulivana.

=== Road ===
Mandya is connected by road State High Way 84.

== Education ==
The college near Hulivana is S.K.E.S. Samyukta Padavi Purva College.
