= Auditory neuropathy spectrum disorder =

Specific form of hearing loss

Auditory neuropathy spectrum disorder (ANSD) is a specific form of hearing loss defined by the presence of normal or near-normal otoacoustic emissions (OAEs) but the absence of normal middle ear reflexes and severely abnormal or completely absent auditory brainstem response (ABRs).

Early diagnosis of auditory neuropathy spectrum disorder (ANSD) in children is critical for timely intervention and optimal speech and language acquisition and development. Guidelines for the diagnosis and management of auditory neuropathy spectrum disorderIndividuals presenting with this recently recognised hearing loss appear to display sporadic windows of hearing and not. Very few (1 in 14) will go on to develop normal speech and language but with poor speech perception in background noise and in others, no speech perception and therefore language development is possible.

The condition was originally termed auditory neuropathy (AN) and in 2001 as Auditory Neuropathy / Auditory Dys-synchrony (AN/AD) (to include those cases where no true neuropathy was apparent). In 2008 at a meeting convened at Lake Como in Italy (Guidelines Development Conference on the Identification and Management of Infants with Auditory Neuropathy, International Newborn Hearing Screening Conference, Como, Italy, June 19–21, 2008), a group of leading authorities on the condition reached a consensus and renamed it as auditory neuropathy spectrum disorder.

== See also ==
- Audiologist
- Auditory brainstem response
- Auditory processing disorder
- Cochlear implant
- Hearing aids
- Sensorineural hearing impairment
