= Steve Liu =

Canadian computer scientist

- 刘学
- Citizenship: Canadian
- Occupation: Computer scientist
- Title: Associate Vice President of Research and Professor of Computer Science and Machine Learning, MBZUAI University; Full Professor, School of Computer Science, McGill University

Academic work
- Sub-discipline: Embedded systems; cyber-physical systems; networking and distributed systems; artificial intelligence
- Institutions: Hewlett-Packard Labs; IBM T. J. Watson Research Center; University of Nebraska–Lincoln; McGill University; Tinder Inc. Samsung AI Center Montreal
- Website: www.cs.mcgill.ca/~xueliu

Steve Liu (Chinese: 刘学, Pinyin: Liu Xue) is a Canadian Computer Scientist. He is an Associate Vice President of Research and Professor of Computer Science and Machine Learning at MBZUAI University. He is a professor in the School of Computer Science at McGill University in Montreal, Quebec, Canada.

== Education ==
Liu obtained his Bachelor of Science degree in Mathematics and his master's degree in Automation and Control Theory from Tsinghua University. He received his Ph.D. in Computer Science from the University of Illinois at Urbana–Champaign.

== Career ==
Dr. Liu joined McGill University in 2007 as a faculty member in the School of Computer Science. He founded the Cyber Physical Intelligence Lab at McGill and is an associated member of the university's Center for Intelligent Machines. He is the Chair Professor of William Dawson Scholar and serves as Courtesy Professor in the Department of Mathematics and Statistics at McGill University. He is affiliated with the Mila - Quebec AI Institute as an associate academic member.

In industry, Liu serves as Vice President R&D, Chief Scientist, and Co‑Director of the Samsung AI Center Montreal. From 2016 to 2019, he was the Chief Scientist of Tinder Inc., where he led research and innovation for the dating and social discovery platform. Earlier in his career, he worked at Hewlett‑Packard Labs in Palo Alto, California, and at the IBM T. J. Watson Research Center in New York. Before moving to McGill, he briefly held the Samuel R. Thompson Chair Associate Professorship in the Department of Computer Science and Engineering at the University of Nebraska–Lincoln. His research spans embedded and cyber‑physical systems, networking and distributed systems, and artificial intelligence and machine learning. He has published more than 500 research papers. He has authored or co‑authored five books or monographs and several book chapters.

Liu has served on the organizing committees of more than 40 international conferences and workshops, including ACM/IEEE CPSWeek, IEEE INFOCOM, IEEE Real‑Time Systems Symposium (RTSS), IEEE Real‑Time and Embedded Technology and Applications Symposium (RTAS), ACM SenSys, IEEE ICDCS, and IWQoS, and has received several service awards. He has also served on the program committees of over 100 international conferences and workshops. He is a member and former or current editor or associate editor of several major journals, including IEEE/ACM Transactions on Networking, ACM Transactions on Cyber‑Physical Systems, IEEE Transactions on Vehicular Technology, IEEE Communications Surveys and Tutorials etc..

Liu is also active in industry, serving as a key technical contributor in several companies such as IBM, HP, Microsoft, General Motors, Tinder, Bell, Michael Kors etc..

== Awards and honors ==
He is a Fellow of the Canadian Academy of Engineering, a Fellow of the Institute of Electrical and Electronics Engineers (IEEE), and an ACM Distinguished Member.
