= Textecution =

Software preventing texting while driving

Textecution is an application developed for the T-Mobile G1 Google phone that restricts the user's ability to text message while driving. It is estimated that 46% of teens text message while driving, a potentially dangerous behavior.

== How It Works ==
A GPS fix determines when the phone is traveling higher than 10 mph and Textecution shuts down the texting abilities. If a user is not driving, he or she can request permission to turn texting on. The parent can allow for the texting to be enabled in this case.

== Reception ==
Textecution has been reviewed by publications including TechCrunch, Wired, Gizmodo, GSM Nation, KTEN, and AOL Finance.
