= Textalyzer =

A textalyzer is a proposed device that would allow the police to detect illegal text messaging while driving. The device has been promoted as a means of reducing distracted driving. The device would be used by police officers who suspect that a driver has been texting while driving using similar procedures currently in place for drivers suspected of driving under the influence. The device would be connected to the driver's mobile phone and would scan the phone for calls, e-mails, or text messages sent when the driver would have been operating the vehicle.

In 2016, legislation was introduced in the New York Senate to implement the use of textalyzers, but the effort ultimately failed. A report by the New York Governor's Traffic Safety Committee was worried about the lack of competing products and unknown costs of the device which the manufacturer was not going to produce until they had a legal market for it. Among other concerns, they stated that there is "no evidence that the product will be able to do what the manufacturer claims." This was echoed by the statement of American Civil Liberties Union, which did not believe the device could be made to reliably distinguish between illegal texts and legal activity such as texts written by a car passenger or texting via hands-free speech-to-text technology. According to an ACLU security engineer, phones do not log information in enough detail to differentiate between these cases.

Law experts as well as members of police have stated that the device might be in contravention of existing privacy laws. The Riley v California Supreme Court case states that a warrant is necessary to search the contents of a cell phone found on an arrested person. Additionally, some see it as an unnecessary breach of privacy to get information that can already be acquired through other means.
