= Texting while driving =

Dangerous use of cell phones

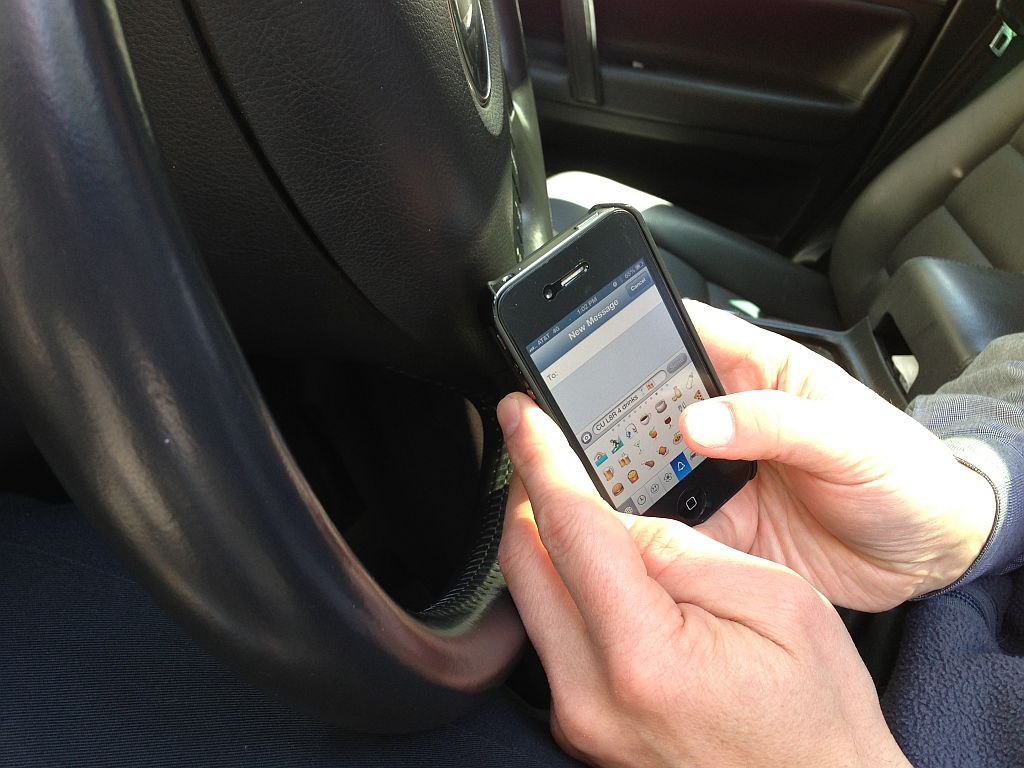
Texting while driving creates unnecessary distractions, and can be dangerous.

Texting while driving, also called texting and driving, is the act of composing, sending, or reading text messages on a mobile phone while operating a motor vehicle. Texting while driving is considered extremely dangerous by many people, including authorities, and in some places has either been outlawed or restricted. As a form of distracted driving, texting while driving significantly increases the chances that a driver will be involved in a motor vehicle accident.

== Prevalence ==
Research by the NHTSA suggests that, in the United States in 2021, at any given daylight moment, an estimated 660,000, out of almost 212 million licensed drivers, used their phones while driving. According to a report issued by the U.S. Department of Transportation, drivers between the ages of 20 and 29 are the most likely to text while driving. In 2010 the International Telecommunication Union said that "texting, making calls, and other interaction with in-vehicle information and communication systems while driving is a serious source of driver distraction and increases the risk of traffic accidents". In 2022, 3,308 people were killed in motor vehicle crashes involving distracted drivers in the U.S. In the United Kingdom, according to the latest Reported Road Casualties Great Britain (2022), 22 people were killed and 674 injured in road traffic collisions where a driver using a mobile phone was considered to be a contributory factor.

== Research ==
As a form of distracted driving, texting while driving significantly increases the chances that a driver will be involved in a motor vehicle accident.

The scientific literature on the dangers of driving while sending a text message from a mobile phone, or driving while texting, is limited but growing. A simulation study at the Monash University Accident Research Center provided strong evidence that retrieving and, in particular, sending text messages has a detrimental effect on a number of safety-critical driving measures. Specifically, negative effects were seen in detecting and responding correctly to road signs, detecting hazards, time spent with eyes off the road, and (only for sending text messages) lateral position. Mean speed, speed variability, lateral position when receiving text messages, and following distance showed no difference. A separate, yet unreleased simulation study at the University of Utah found a sixfold increase in distraction-related crashes when texting.

The low number of scientific studies may be indicative of a general assumption that if talking on a mobile phone increases risk, then texting also increases risk, and probably more so. 89% of U.S. adults think that text messaging while driving is "distracting, dangerous and should be outlawed". The AAA Foundation for Traffic Safety has released polling data that show that 87% of people consider texting and e-mailing while driving a "very serious" safety threat, almost equivalent to the 90% of those polled who consider drunk driving a threat. Recently, AAA released a study showing texting while driving is six times more likely to cause an accident than drunk driving.

Despite the acknowledgement of the dangers of texting behind the wheel, about half of drivers 16 to 24 say they have texted while driving, compared with 22 percent of drivers 35 to 44. A survey of more than 90 teens from more than 26 high schools throughout the United States conducted by Liberty Mutual Insurance Group in 2006 showed that 46% of students consider texting to be either "very" or "extremely" distracting. An American Automobile Association study showed that 34% of teens (age 16–17) admitted to being distracted behind the wheel because of texting and 40% of American teens say they have been in a car when the driver used a cell phone in a way that put people in danger. A study involving commercial vehicle operators conducted in September 2009 concluded that though incidence of texting within their data set was low, texting while driving increased the risk of accident significantly.

Texting while driving received greater attention in the late 2000s, corresponding to a rise in the number of text messages being sent. The 2008 Will Smith film Seven Pounds deals with Smith's character committing suicide in order to donate his organs to help save the lives of seven people to make up for the seven people he killed in a car accident because he was receiving a text message while he was driving. Texting while driving attracted interest in the media after several highly publicized car crashes were caused by texting drivers, including a May 2009 incident involving a Boston trolley car driver who crashed while texting his girlfriend. Texting was blamed in the 2008 Chatsworth train collision which killed 25 passengers. Investigations revealed that the engineer of that train had sent 45 text messages while operating. Despite these incidents, texting was still on the rise.

A July 2010 Fairleigh Dickinson University PublicMind poll found 25% of New Jersey voters admitted to sending a text while driving, which was an increase from 15% in 2008. This increase could be attributed to drivers over the age of 30 sending text messages. More than 35% of New Jersey drivers aged 30 to 45 and 17% of drivers over 45 admitted to having sent a text message while driving in the last year, an increase of 5–10% from 2008.

Several studies have attempted to compare the dangers of texting while driving with driving under the influence. One such study was conducted by Car and Driver magazine in June 2009. The study, carried out at the Oscoda-Wurtsmith Airport in Oscoda, Michigan, used two drivers in real cars and measured reaction times to the onset of light on the windshield. The study compared the reaction times and distances of the subjects while reading a text message, replying to the text message, and impaired. The study showed that at 35 mph (56 km/h), reading a text message increased the reaction time the most, 0.12 and 0.87 seconds. Impaired driving at the same speed resulted in an increase of 0.01 and 0.07 seconds. In terms of stopping distances these times were estimated to mean:

- Unimpaired: 0.54 seconds to brake
- Legally drunk: add 4 feet (1.2 m)
- Reading e-mail: add 36 feet (11 m)
- Sending a text: add 70 feet (21 m)

On September 29, 2010, the insurance industry's Highway Loss Data Institute released research purporting to show that texting-while-driving bans in four states failed to reduce crashes and may instead have contributed to an increase in road crashes. U.S. Transportation Secretary Ray LaHood called the study "completely misleading".

In March 2012, the UK's Institute of Advanced Motorists published a study which claimed that using social media puts a driver at greater risk than driving under the influence. In 2013, based on the 2011 Youth Risk Behavior Surveillance System Survey conducted by the Center for Disease Control in the US, nearly half of all male and female respondents aged 16 to 19 reported they texted while driving.

In 2013, the National Safety Council estimated there were about 1.4 million crashes in the US involving cell phone use. Their model predicted text messaging was involved in 6–16% of all car accidents in the US. In 2010, texting while driving among young drivers was named a disease burden and ranked 8th overall in the global years of life lost (YLL). The premature mortality of young drivers who crash as a result of distracted driving has a greater effect on YLL than most diseases do.

Research by the Transport Research Laboratory showed that texting while driving slowed a driver's reaction time more so than drinking alcohol or using drugs. Drivers' reaction times decreased by 46% while making a call, 37% when texting and driving, and 27% during hands-free calls. Those who were drinking and driving at the limit of 80 mg of alcohol per 100ml of blood, reaction times slowed by 13% and 21% for those under the influence of cannabis.

A study in 2021 by the University of Buffalo revealed that a similar habit, texting while walking, causes more injuries than texting while driving.

In November 2014, Sawyer et al., from the University of Central Florida and the US Air Force Research Laboratory, published the results of comparative study in a driving simulator. Messages sent through Google Glass posed a decreased distraction but still impaired drivers.

In October 2016, Texas A&M Transportation Institute and Aceable Driving published a study showing that teenagers are more likely to witness their parents or legal guardians driving distracted than their friends and peers. The study also suggested that texting and driving bans are somewhat effective. In Austin, Texas, where a hands-free-driving ordinance prohibiting the use of electronic hand-held devices while operating a vehicle or bicycle has been in place since 2015, 41% of teens reported that they never witnessed their parents or guardians driving distracted. In Houston, Texas, which had no ban on hand-held devices during the time of the study, only 23% of teens said the same.

=== Virginia Tech Transportation Institute study ===
On July 27, 2009, the Virginia Tech Transportation Institute (VTTI) released preliminary findings of their study of driver distraction in commercial vehicles. Several naturalistic driving studies, of long-haul trucks as well as lighter vehicles driving six million combined miles, used video cameras to observe the drivers and road. Researchers observed 4,452 "safety-critical" events, which includes crashes, near crashes, safety-critical events, and lane deviations. 81% of the "safety-critical" events involved some type of driver distraction. Text messaging had the greatest relative risk, with drivers of heavy vehicles or trucks being more than 23 times more likely to experience a safety-critical event when texting.

The study found that drivers typically take their eyes off the forward roadway for an average of four out of six seconds when texting, and an average of 4.6 out of the six seconds surrounding safety-critical events. The study revealed that when traveling at 55 miles per hour (89 km/h), a driver texting for 6 seconds is looking at the phone for 4.6 seconds of that time and travels the distance of a football field without their eyes on the road. Some of VTTI's conclusions from this study included that "texting should be banned in moving vehicles for all drivers", and that "all cell phone use should be banned for newly licensed teen drivers". The results of the study are listed in the table below.

Risk increases of cell phone tasks by vehicle type
Type of vehicle	Cell phone task	Risk of crash or near event crash (compared to non-distracted driving)
Light Vehicle	Dialing	2.8 times as high
Light Vehicle	Talking/Listening	1.3 times as high
Light Vehicle	Reaching for object (e.g. electronic device)	1.4 times as high
Heavy Vehicles/Trucks	Dialing	5.9 times as high
Heavy Vehicles/Trucks	Talking/Listening	1.0 times as high
Heavy Vehicles/Trucks	Reach for electronic device	6.7 times as high
Heavy Vehicles/Trucks	Text messaging	23.2 times as high

=== Distracted vs. impaired driving ===
A 2010 experiment with Car and Driver magazine editor Eddie Alterman, which took place at a deserted air strip, showed that texting while driving had a worse impact on safety than driving while intoxicated. The Institute of Industrial Engineers concluded that drivers are 20 times more likely to be involved in a crash while texting and driving as opposed to driving while intoxicated.

While legally drunk, Alterman's stopping distance from 70 mph (110 km/h) increased by 4 feet (1.2 m); by contrast, reading an e-mail added 36 feet (11 m), and sending a text added 70 feet (21 m). While celebrities such as Oprah Winfrey have campaigned against texting while driving, there are reports that the message has not been getting through. The Florida Department of Highway Safety and Motor Vehicles also seeks to bring awareness to the issue and has designated April as Distracted Driving Awareness Month.

=== Problematic mobile phone use ===
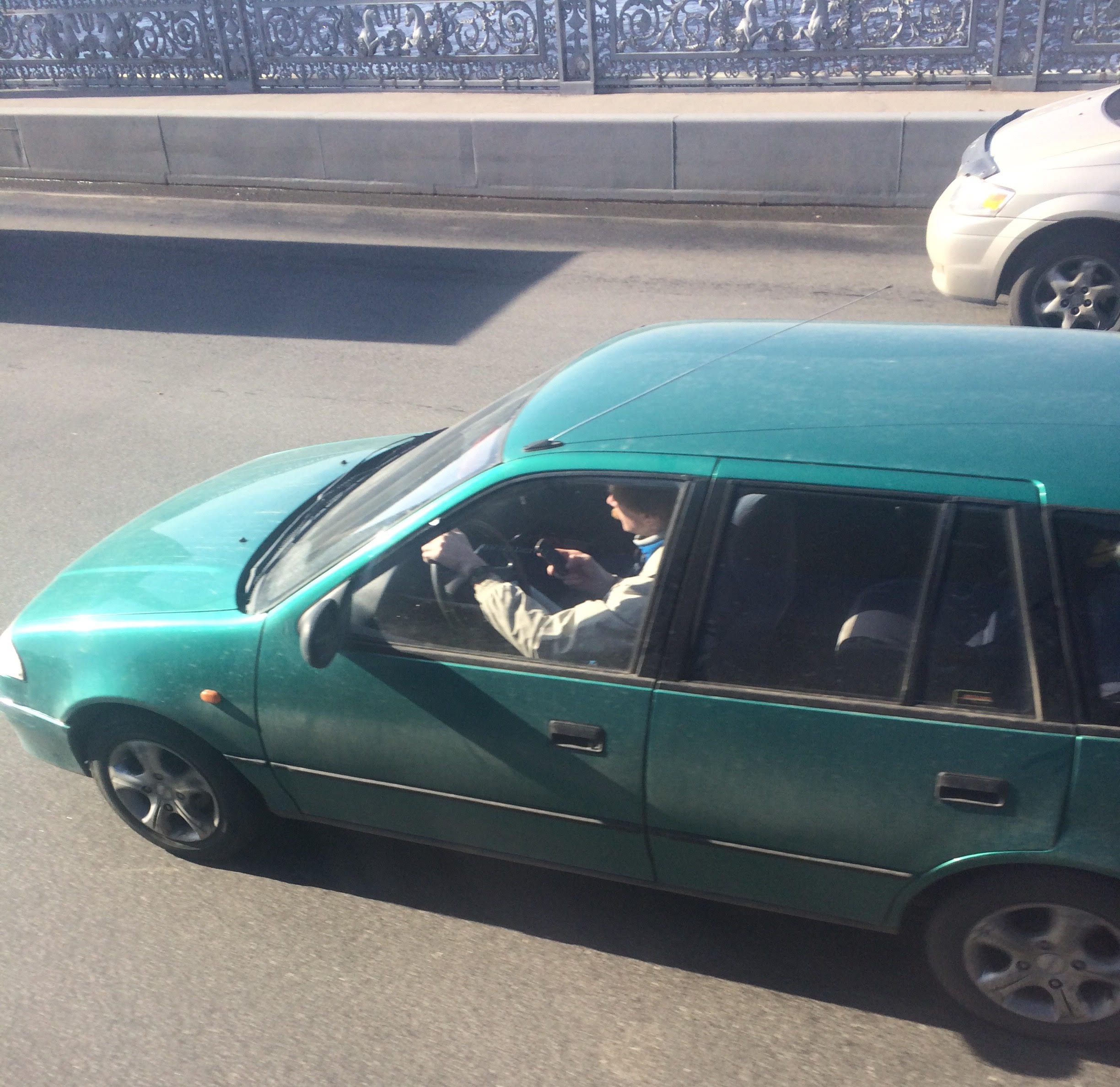
A driver using a mobile phone

An association between problematic mobile phone use and a greater risk of simultaneous mobile phone use and road use and risk of vehicle collisions and pedestrian collisions or falls has been found.

== Dangers ==
The popularity of mobile devices has some unintended and even dangerous consequences. The use of mobile devices is linked to a significant increase in distracted driving, resulting in injury and even loss of life.

- In 2010 the National Highway Traffic Safety Administration reported that distracted drivers were the cause of 18% of all fatal crashes with 3,092 people being killed, and crashes that resulted in injuries with 416,000 people wounded.
- According to a Pew Research Centre survey, 40% of American teens say that they have been in a car where the driver used a cell phone in a way which put people in danger.
- The Virginia Tech Transportation Institute has found that text messaging creates a crash risk that is 23 times worse than driving while not being distracted.
- Eleven percent of drivers who are between the ages of 18 and 20 who were involved in an automobile crash and survived have admitted that they were either sending or receiving texts when they crashed.

== Laws by location ==
Legality of mobile phone use while driving: Illegal in all cases Hands-on illegal, hands-free legal Talking legal, texting illegal Phone use legal No data

A number of countries ban all cell phone use while driving (talking and texting).

=== Australia ===
The laws are much the same for all states and territories in Australia. The driver of a vehicle (except an emergency vehicle, taxi or police vehicle) must not use a mobile phone while the vehicle is moving, or is stationary but not parked, unless the driver is exempt from this rule under another law of this jurisdiction. The law does not apply if the phone is in a secured fixed mounting that is positioned in such a way that the driver does not have to take their eyes off the road. The law also does not apply if the driver is using a hands free device. In some jurisdictions, provisional or learner drivers are banned from all forms of mobile phone usage while they are in control of a vehicle. Apart from mobile phones, drivers should not appear to be distracted by anything else; this includes GPS devices and PDAs.

=== Canada ===
In 2003, the first ban on cellphone use while driving was enforced in the province of Newfoundland and Labrador. Since then, this ban has spread to all of the remaining provinces in the country. This ban does not include the use of hands-free devices.

=== Germany ===
Any use of a mobile phone is forbidden as long as the vehicle's engine is running. This does however not apply to hand-free devices, provided that the driver does not become distracted. In 2014 a higher court overturned a ruling of a lower court and ruled that the use of a mobile phone is allowed while in traffic, if it occurs while the vehicle is stopped and a start-stop system has turned the engine off.

=== Netherlands ===
Any use of a mobile phone is forbidden if the vehicle is moving. This does not apply, however, to hands-free devices.

=== New Zealand ===
In 2009, the New Zealand Government introduced new clauses to its Land Transport (Road User) Rule, which ban any use of mobile phones while driving, except for emergency calling to 111 or *555 (only if unsafe or impracticable to stop the vehicle to make the call).

=== Sweden ===
The Government of Sweden, as of December 22, 2012, has stated that texting while driving is not an offence that can lead to a ban, but that it is looking to clarify the Highway Code to include it under reckless driving. In 2013, Sweden outlawed mobile telephone activities if it affects driving in a negative way.

=== United Arab Emirates ===
The use of mobiles while driving is prohibited and offenders can also expect to have demerit points added to their record. In one instance a UAE minister was himself given a fine for using his mobile phone while driving.

=== United Kingdom ===
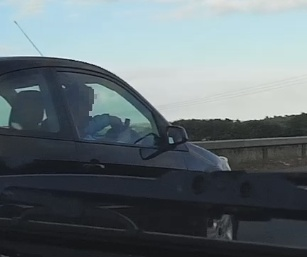
Driver texting while driving a car in the United Kingdom

Any use of a hand-held mobile phone or similar device while driving, or supervising a learner driver, is illegal. This includes when stopped at traffic lights. The only exceptions are emergency calls to 999 or 112, making a contactless payment while stationary, for instance at a drive-through or toll booth, or using the device to remotely park your vehicle.

=== United States ===
Texting while driving is generally outlawed for drivers in all states and the District of Columbia except Montana and formerly Missouri until August 28, 2023, when a law took effect banning cell phone use while driving. Citations will be issued for violation beginning January 1, 2025.

On October 1, 2009, the U.S. Department of Transportation (DOT) announced President Barack Obama's signing of an Executive Order directing federal employees not to engage in text messaging while driving government-owned vehicles, among other activities. According to Transportation Secretary Ray Lahood, "This order sends a very clear signal to the American public that distracted driving is dangerous and unacceptable. It shows that the federal government is leading by example." As a part of a larger move to combat distracted driving, the DOT and National Highway Traffic Safety Administration (NHTSA) launched the public information website distraction.gov. In addition, a petition was created on the White House petitions site, We the People, to ask the Obama administration to encourage all states that have not done so to create laws that ban texting and driving.

On January 26, 2010, the U.S. Department of Transportation announced a federal ban on texting while driving by truckers and bus drivers.

==== Existing laws ====
State	Effective	Restriction	Penalty	Other details	Source
Alabama	August 1, 2012	Ban on all cell phone use (handheld and hands-free) for novice drivers. Ban on texting for all drivers.	Penalties include a $25 fine for the first offense, increasing to $50 and $75 and two points on the driver's license.		
Alaska	September 1, 2008; May 11, 2012	House Bill 8 prohibits drivers from using electronic devices with a visual display (e.g. televisions or computers) while driving. The law does not specify cell phones, though it can be interpreted this way, and is seen as a ban on texting and driving. HB 255 was signed into law May 11, 2012, and specifically targets "cell phone texting". The previous 2008 HB 8 and 2012 HB 255 laws do provide for exceptions, such a caller ID usage while making a voice phone call and using GPS devices.	Alaska's anti-texting laws are considered "primary" laws, which means that an officer can pull one over for an offense without having witnessed another violation. Anyone that violates this law (depending on the circumstances) would only be guilty of a misdemeanor and if a driver is in a crash that results in an injury or death, then they would be charged with a felony.	For the 2008 HB 8, violators are guilty of misdemeanor. If death is caused by violation, violator is guilty of a felony. For the 2012 HB 255, violators are guilty of a Class A Misdemeanor (same as DUI) and can result in a $250 to $500 fine for first-time offenders, but could result in jail time. (Need Citation)	2008 HB 8; 2012 HB 255
Arizona	April 2019	Prohibits all drivers from using a cellphone or a stand-alone electronic device while driving unless it is being used in a hands-free mode. There are exceptions to the law, including emergency responders, people in an emergency situation or alerting first responders to an emergency situation or crime.	First violation: $75 - $149 Subsequent violation: $150 - $250	Simple tasks such as engaging and disengaging a function on the device such as GPS route start and answering or ending a call are permitted, as long as they do not significantly distract the driver from the road.	
Arkansas	October 2009	All drivers, regardless of age or experience, prohibited from sending text messages while driving	Offenders can face fines up to $100.	Known as HB1013 or "Paul's Law". Exempts emergency service providers in the provision of services. A violation of the law is a primary offense, meaning it can be the sole reason for a traffic stop.	
California	January 1, 2009	Prohibits use of any handheld electronic device while driving	$20 first offense $50 each subsequent offense		
Colorado	December 1, 2009	Prohibits sending text messages, email, or tweets while driving	First offense: 4 points and $300 fine for adults. 1 point and $50 fine for minor drivers Subsequent violation: 4 points and $1,000 fine for adults. 1 point and $100 fine for minor drivers	Also prohibits drivers under 18 from talking on a cellphone while driving	
Connecticut	June 3, 2010	Use of any handheld device for any purpose other than to report a life-threatening emergency is prohibited	$100 first offense $150 second offense $250 third or subsequent offense	Also prohibits drivers under 18 and school bus drivers carrying passengers from talking on a cellphone while driving	
Delaware	January 2, 2011	Hand-held devices illegal for all drivers	$50 first offense $100 second offense $200 third or subsequent offense	Also prohibits drivers under 18 from talking on hands-free cell phones while driving	
District of Columbia	Unknown	All handheld cell phone use banned	First time offenders will have their fines suspended, but only if they submit proof of that they have acquired a hands free device. If a driver is from another jurisdiction and are ticketed for a cell phone driving infraction, then they may lose their driver's license if they have failed to pay their Washington D.C. ticket. There is a $100 fine for repeat offenders for each violation.	The ban is considered to be a "primary" law, as it does prohibit use of cell phones by bus drivers. A primary law is when an officer can pull you over for an offense without even having to witness another violation, to say that if an officer see you texting he can issue you a citation.	
Florida	October 1, 2013	Senate bill SB 52 prohibits drivers in Florida from typing into a virtual keyboard and sending or reading messages. However, a driver can only be charged for the violation if they are cited for another motor vehicle violation.	If officers pull a driver over for another offense and see that the driver was also texting, drivers would be subject to a $30 fine on the first offense. If texting results in a crash, the driver would be assessed six points. Points lead to increased insurance rates.		
Georgia	July 1, 2010 (Texting) July 1, 2018 (All)	Prohibits writing, sending, or reading any text-based communication, including via internet; also prohibits drivers under 18 with provisional licenses from talking on cell phones while driving. Prohibits holding or supporting, with any part of the body, a wireless telecommunications device or stand-alone electronic device.	1st conviction – 1 point and $50.00 fine 2nd conviction – 2 points and $100.00 fine 3rd or more convictions – 3 points and $150.00 fine	The ban is considered to be a "primary" law, as it does prohibit use of cell phones by bus drivers. A primary law is when an officer can pull you over for an offense without even having to witness another violation, to say that if an officer see you texting he can issue you a citation.	
Hawaii	July 1, 2013	Illegal to use most electronic devices while operating a motor vehicle	$200 for a first offense	The State of Hawaii does not use a point system, so texting while driving violations will not access any points assessed on a driver's license, and because this penalty is not deemed to be a traffic infraction, it has no effect on one's driving record.	
Idaho	July 1, 2012	Illegal for all drivers	Anyone who violates this law will be guilty of an infraction and will not result in any violation point counts as it is as prescribed in section 49-326, of Idaho Code. Additionally a conviction will not be deemed as a moving traffic violation for the purpose of establishing rates of motor vehicle insurance that is charged by a casualty insurer.		
Illinois	January 1, 2010	Illegal for all drivers to use handheld devices. Only hands-free devices such as speakerphones, Bluetooth, and headsets are permitted. In addition to the ban on using handheld devices, all cell phone use is prohibited while driving in a school zone, in a construction zone, and all cell phone use is prohibited for novice drivers. Texting is prohibited for all drivers in Illinois.	Violation fines start at $75	This is a Primary Law, which means that the driver can receive a ticket for the violation without other traffic violations taking place (such as speeding).	
Indiana	July 1, 2011	All drivers prohibited from reading or sending text messages. Drivers under 18 prohibited from using cell phones for any purpose. Up to $500 fine.	Up to $500 fine.		
Iowa	July 1, 2010	Adults are banned from text messaging while driving and teens are prohibited from using handheld electronic devices.	$30 for adults texting while driving and $50 for teens using handheld electronic devices		
Kansas	May 24, 2010	Illegal for all drivers this includes to report a current or Report current or ongoing illegal activity to law enforcement; to prevent imminent injury to a person or property; or to relay information between transit or for-hire operator and the operator's dispatcher, in which the device is permanently affixed to the motor vehicle.	$60	Exemptions to the ban includes: (1) A law enforcement officer or emergency service personnel acting within the course and scope of the law enforcement officer's or emergency service personnel's employment; (2) a motor vehicle stopped off the regular traveled portion of the roadway; (3) a person who reads, selects or enters a telephone number or name in a wireless communications device for the purpose of making or receiving a phone call; (4) a person who receives an emergency, traffic or weather alert message; or (5) a person receiving a message related to the operation or navigation of the motor vehicle.	
Kentucky	July 15, 2010	House Bill 415 prohibits the following: Reading, writing, and sending email or text messages by all drivers when the vehicle is in motion.; All cell phone usage by drivers under 18, regardless of license type. Exceptions for emergencies, and for GPS use that does not involve data entry.	Warnings until January 1, 2011. After that date: $25 for first offense; $50 for subsequent offenses; For drivers under 18 on restricted licenses, mandatory 180-day waiting period from the time of offense before graduating to the next license level. This applies from the law's effective date.	Drivers 18 and over allowed to read, select and enter phone numbers or names in order to make a call. All drivers allowed to use GPS features and drivers 18 and over allowed to enter data for GPS purposes at all times.	
Louisiana	August 15, 2010	SB9 prohibits the following: Text messaging ban for all drivers.	Primary enforcement begins August 15, 2010: Fines up to $175 (first offense); $500 (second offense)	Drivers under 18 years old may not use wireless devices — including cell phones, text-messaging units and computers — while operating motor vehicles: Drivers with learner's and intermediate licenses prohibited from using cell phones unless a hands-free device is attached	
Maine	September 26, 2011	Prohibits texting while driving	Fine of $100 for first offense and then increased fines for subsequent offenses.	This is a Primary Law, which means that the driver can receive a ticket for the violation without other traffic violations taking place (such as speeding).	
Maryland	July 1, 2009	Prohibits writing or sending text messages as well as using handheld cell phones while operating motor vehicle or while in the travel portion of the roadway.	Fine up to $500	Exception for use of GPS or emergency situations.	
Massachusetts	July 6, 2010	Prohibits drivers from sending a text or instant message, use of electronic mail, Internet access, and all of the above on electronic devices including phones, laptops, pagers, or other hand-held devices.	First offense: $100, second offense: $250, and 3rd offense: $500; If one is under 18, 1st offense: $100 fine in addition to a 60-day license suspension, and attend a mandatory "attitude" class. 2nd offense: $250 fine and a 180-day suspension. 3rd offense: $500 fine and a-one year suspension.	GPSs are still allowed. Use of a phone is banned to all people under 18. Once 18, a driver can make hands-free or normal calls. Also, the bill requires anyone over 75 to get a driving test every five years and take a vision test.	
Michigan	July 1, 2010	Reading, typing, or sending while vehicle is moving	$100 first offense $200 each subsequent offense	Exception for use of GPS or emergency situations.	
Minnesota	August 1, 2008	Any form of text messaging while driving is illegal, and is considered a petty misdemeanor statewide.	Up to $300.	Also prohibits drivers under 18 from talking on a cellphone while driving; GPS and cell phone usage still allowed.	
Mississippi	2014	Illegal for all drivers	Fines up to $500; or $1,000 if a crash results.		
Missouri	August 28, 2016	Text messaging while operating a motor vehicle prohibited for persons under 21 and for commercial vehicle operators.	Points assessed against license	This is a Primary Law, which means that the driver can receive a ticket for the violation without other traffic violations taking place (such as speeding).	
Montana	2009-2013	In cities such as Missoula, Bozeman, Helena, Whitefish, Butte-Silver Bow, Hamilton, Great Falls and Billings. It is illegal to text while operating a vehicle.	$50 First offense, $100 second offense, $200 third offense. 2 point moving violation is added onto one's record.		
Nebraska	2013–2014	Text messaging is banned for all drivers on Nebraska's roads and highways. Those drivers under the age of 18 who have either a learner's permit or other intermediate licenses are prohibited from using cellphones altogether.	Fines $200–$500 plus 3 points against driver's license.		
Nevada	July 1, 2011	Drivers are prohibited from using either a cell phone or other wireless communications device to access or search the Internet, or to type, enter, send, or read any non-voice communication, including text messages, instant messages (IM), or email. Global positioning systems (GPS) are not covered by the law.	Fines of up to $50 for a first offense; $100 for a second offense that occurs within seven years; and $250 for a third offense if this occurs within seven years. Higher fines are imposed on drivers who violate the law in traffic control zones.	Ban does not apply to emergency personnel, or licensed amateur radio operators who are communicating certain public information, employees of public utilities who are responding to emergencies, or drivers who are reporting emergencies or responding to dangerous situations.	
New Hampshire	January 1, 2010	Use of handheld devices is illegal for all drivers	$100	This is a Primary Law, which means that the driver can receive a ticket for the violation without other traffic violations taking place (such as speeding).	
New Jersey	March 1, 2008	All drivers are prohibited from using handheld cell phones except if: (1) The operator has reason to fear for his life or safety, or believes that a criminal act may be perpetrated against himself or another person; or (2) The operator is using the telephone to report to appropriate authorities a fire, a traffic accident, a serious road hazard or medical or hazardous materials emergency, or to report the operator of another motor vehicle who is driving in a reckless, careless or otherwise unsafe manner or who appears to be driving under the influence of alcohol or drugs.	$200 to $400 for the first offense, $400 to $600 for the second offense, and up to $800, three points on your license. Possible 90-day suspension of license.	Anyone under the age of 21 who have either a learner's permits or probationary licenses are prohibited from using all cell phones, texting devices and other hand-held or hands-free wireless electronic devices while driving (this includes MP3 players, video games, and similar devices).	
New Mexico	Unknown	Illegal for all drivers	$25 for a first offense, then $50.	This is a Primary Law, which means that the driver can receive a ticket for the violation without other traffic violations taking place (such as speeding).	
New York	2009	No person shall operate a motor vehicle while using any portable electronic device while such vehicle is in motion. "Using" shall mean holding a portable electronic device while viewing, taking or transmitting images, playing games, or composing, sending, reading, viewing, accessing, browsing, transmitting, saving or retrieving e-mail, text messages, or other electronic data.	Fine up to $150 plus mandatory $85 surcharge fees. Violation also carries 5 driver violation points. Those who are driving on a permit, junior license or probationary licence will have their license suspended for 120 days on the first offense and one year for subsequent offenses.	Does not apply to (a) the use of a portable electronic device for the sole purpose of communicating with any of the following regarding an emergency situation: an emergency response operator; a hospital; a physician's office or health clinic; an ambulance company or corps; a fire department, district or company; or a police department, (b) any of the following persons while in the performance of their official duties: a police officer or peace officer; a member of a fire department, district or company; or the operator of an authorized emergency vehicle as defined in section one hundred one of this chapter.	
North Carolina	December 1, 2009	Text messaging as well email and internet use is prohibited for all drivers. Drivers under the age of 18 who have a provisional are prohibited from using cell phones while driving, unless they are calling their parents. Operators of school buses are prohibited from using cell phones while driving.	Texting, email and internet use: $100 and no points against license.; Drivers under 18 using cellphone: $25.; School bus operators using cell phones $100, no points.		
North Dakota	August 1, 2011	Text messaging is prohibited for all drivers, and driver under the age of 18 are prohibited from using any electronic communications devices, including cell phones.	$100 fine.	This is a Primary Law, which means that the driver can receive a ticket for the violation without other traffic violations taking place (such as speeding).	
Ohio	August 28, 2012	Illegal for all drivers: Primary offense for drivers under 18 years old. Youth drivers may be stopped and cited for texting while driving.; Secondary offense for adult drivers. Adult drivers must be stopped for another offense before they can be cited.	For offenders under 18: 1st offense: $150 fine and 60-day license suspension 2nd offense: $300 fine and 1-year license suspension and 6 months in prison For offenders over 18: $150 fine	The use of any handheld device by drivers under the age of 18 is illegal.	
Oklahoma	November 1, 2015	It shall be unlawful for any person to operate a motor vehicle on any street or highway within this state while using a hand-held electronic communication device to manually compose, send or read an electronic text message while the motor vehicle is in motion.	Maximum fine of $100. No points on driving record.	Oklahoma State Governor Mary Fallen signed House Bill 1965 on May 5, 2015, making texting while driving illegal in the state. The act went into law on November 1, 2015.	
Oregon	January 2010	House Bill 2377 prohibits all drivers from using a mobile communication device while operating a motor vehicle. A mobile communication device is defined as "a text messaging device or a wireless, two-way communication device designed to receive and transmit voice or text communication." House Bill 2872 prohibits drivers that are under 18 years of age from using any type of mobile communication device such as a cell-phone. This includes text-messaging and does not allow for hands-free operation of a cell-phone. This law applies if one is under 18 and driving with a provisional driver's license, a special student driver permit, or an instruction driver permit.	Minimum fine of $142.00	HB 2377 exempts use of hands-free devices by all drivers 18 and over; some drivers who use a mobile communications device while driving if the vehicle is necessary for the person's job; and some drivers who use radios (CB-style) while in the scope of their employment.	
Pennsylvania	March 8, 2012	Text messaging while driving prohibited for all drivers. There is no statewide limit on cell phone use, but some local ordinances address cell phones and driving.	$50 fine		
Rhode Island	2009	Text messaging outlawed for all drivers on Rhode Island roads. Those under the age of 18 prohibited from using cell phones altogether. School bus operators prohibited from using cell phones while driving.	$85 for the first offense, then $100 and then $125.	Considered "primary" laws, which means that an officer can pull one over and issue a citation for the offense without having to witness some other violation.	
South Carolina	June 9, 2014	Prohibits driver from writing, sending or reading a text while driving, but can text only if they are legally stopped or are using a hands-free device. Also includes social media & emails.	$25 fine the first offence; $50 fine for subsequent offences	Known as bill S 459, it supersedes at least 19 different city, as well as two county, ordinances on texting. Exception for use of GPS or emergency situations.	
South Dakota	2013	All drivers are banned from text messaging while driving. Drivers who are under the age of 18 who have a restricted/learners license are banned from using handheld wireless communications devices. At least nine South Dakota cities have distracted driving ordinances — Rapid City, Huron, Watertown, Brookings, Mitchell, Vermillion, Aberdeen, Box Elder and Sioux Falls.	$100		
Tennessee	July 1, 2009	All drivers prohibited from transmitting or reading a written message while vehicle is in motion	Up to $50; Plus court costs not to exceed $10	Also known as Senate Bill 393.	
Texas	September 1, 2017	Texas legislators enforce texting while driving laws and bans.	Anyone who violates this law receives a ticket and faces a misdemeanor charge, also receives a fine between $25 and $99.	Anyone who is responsible for an individual's death or serious injury from texting while driving face a fine up to $4000.	
Utah	May 2009	Texting, accessing the internet, manually dialing a number and other similar use of a handheld device is prohibited while driving. Exceptions to this law are talking, using voice commands, and GPS navigation.	First offence: Class C misdemeanor Second offence: Class B misdemeanor Automatic Class B misdemeanor if the person inflicted serious bodily injury upon another as a proximate result of using a handheld wireless communication device for text messaging or electronic mail communication while operating a moving motor vehicle		
Vermont	October 1, 2014	All "portable electronic device" usage banned for drivers under 18 Handheld electronic devices are banned for all drivers	First offense: $100 fine + surcharge + 15% = $156 and 2 points on license. Junior Operators (under 18) subject to 30-day suspension. Second offense (within two years of first): $250 fine + surcharge + 15% = $329, 5 points on license. Junior operators subject to 30-day suspension.		
Virginia	2009 January 1, 2021	Use of phone to talk is allowed, but text or email by the driver whilst vehicle is operational on state roads is prohibited. An exception exists for using GPS, dialing a number to make a call, or reporting an emergency. School bus drivers are prohibited from using cell phones either handheld or hands-free. As of January 1, 2021, all handheld use of a phone will be prohibited. Exceptions allowed for when lawfully parked or stopped, emergency vehicles, reporting an emergency, using the radio, and traffic incident management workers.	$125–$250	Violations are a primary offense	
Washington	2010	Illegal for all drivers	$124, more if an accident results	Text messaging or cell phone use without a hands free device is a primary offense.	
West Virginia	Summer 2012	Text messaging and the use of handheld cell phones are illegal for all drivers in West Virginia. Teenagers who have a learner's permits or intermediate licenses are prohibited from using wireless communication devices while driving. School bus drivers are prohibited from using cell phones while operating the vehicles.	$100 (first offense), then $200, then $300. Three points against the driver's license on the third and subsequent convictions.	West Virginia's texting & handheld cell phone law and 17C-14-15	
Wisconsin	December 1, 2010	Illegal for all drivers The law is primary, meaning police officers can stop motorists suspected of this offense alone.	First offense: $20–$400 fine and 4 points on license Second offense: $200–$800 fine	Signed into Law: May 5, 2010	Wisconsin DOT
Wyoming	July 1, 2010	Sending message from any electronic device while driving declared illegal.	$75 for first offense.		

== Notable collisions ==
- On August 29, 2007, Danny Oates was killed by a young driver of a car, allegedly texting while driving. The defense had argued that driver Jeffrey Woods had possibly suffered a seizure during the time of the accident.
- On January 3, 2008, Heather Leigh Hurd was killed by a truck driver who allegedly was texting while driving. Her father Russell Hurd has been actively supporting a law in various U.S. states called Heather's Law that would prohibit texting while driving.
- The 2008 Chatsworth train collision, which killed 25 people, and which occurred on September 12, 2008, was blamed on the operator sending text messages while operating the train.
- In May 2009, a crash occurred on the MBTA Green Line in the Boston area of the MBTA, when a driver, 24-year-old Aidan Quinn, was text messaging his girlfriend while driving the train. The crash, which injured 46 people, was estimated by MBTA officials to have cost $9.6 million.
- Beverly Hills plastic surgeon Frank Ryan's fatal crash on August 16, 2010, may have been the result of distracted driving due to texting.
- In May 2012, a jury in Corpus Christi, Texas, awarded $21 million in damages to a woman who was struck by a Coca-Cola driver who had been on her cell phone at the time of the accident. The plaintiff's attorneys were able to successfully argue that Coca-Cola's cell phone policy for its drivers was "vague and ambiguous".
- In June 2012, 18-year-old Aaron Deveau of Haverhill, Massachusetts, was found guilty of motor vehicle homicide by texting. He was sentenced to two years in prison and loss of his license for 15 years. Deveau was the first person in the state of Massachusetts to be convicted of motor vehicle homicide by texting, and possibly the first in the United States.
- In September 2012, 21-year-old Stephanie Kanoff of Sun Prairie, Wisconsin, was found guilty by a jury in July of homicide by negligent driving for the October 24, 2010, death of Dylan Ellefson, 21, a senior at UW-Madison, who was behind his disabled car when he and his car were struck by Kanoff's minivan. Kanoff was also sentenced to serve two years of extended supervision after her release from prison. In addition to prison and extended supervision, Kanoff was ordered to spend 100 hours speaking to young people learning to drive and other groups about the dangers of texting while driving, and was also ordered to not drive with a phone that's turned on in the driver's area of a car. Kanoff will also have to take a driving safety course to get her license back after a mandatory yearlong revocation.
- In March 2017, near Garner State Park, which is located in Concan, Texas, 13 people in a church bus were killed when a texting pickup truck driver crossed the center line and slammed into their bus.

== Technology as a solution ==
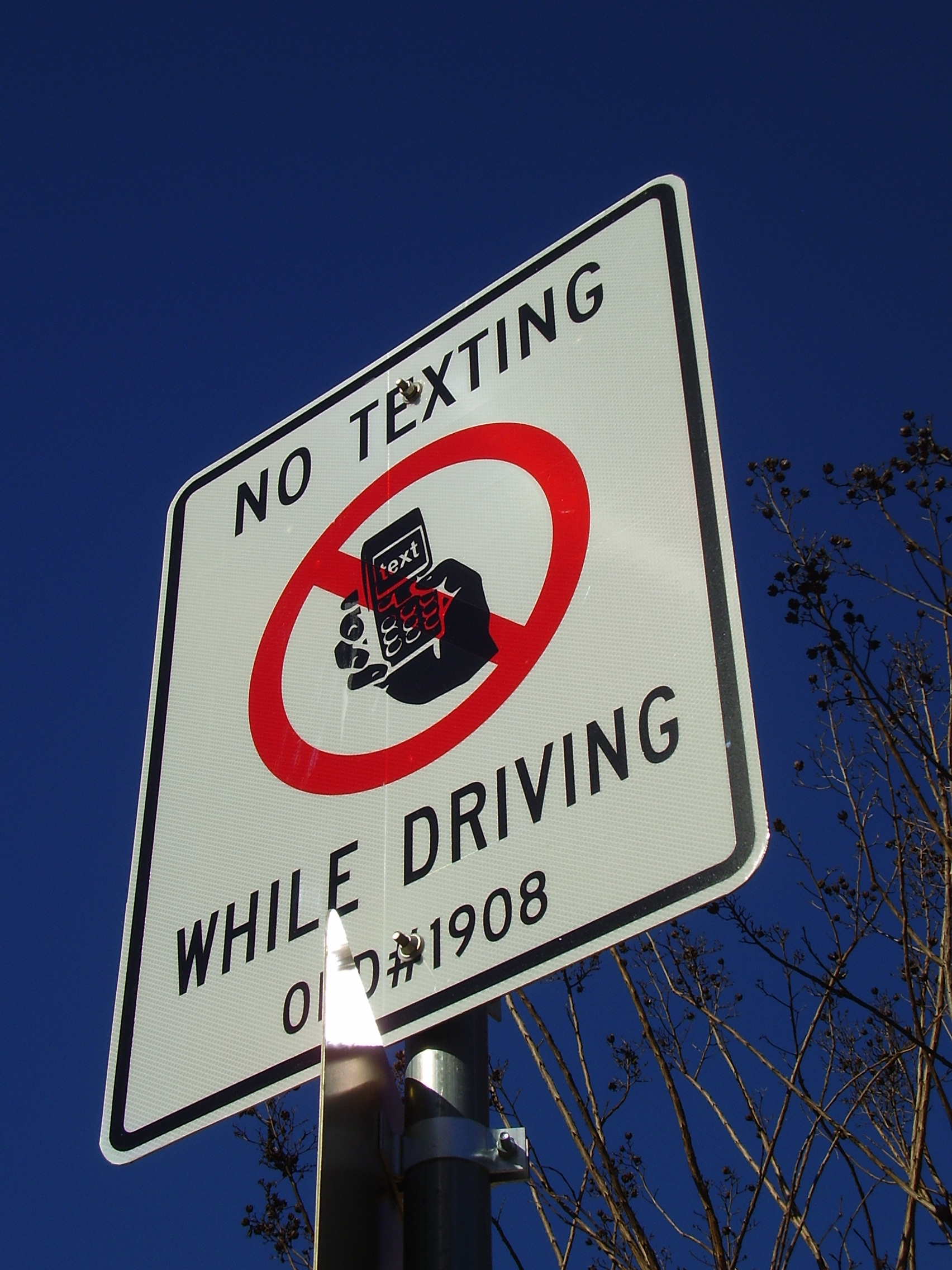
A sign in West University Place, Texas (Greater Houston), advising drivers that they are not allowed to text

In 2009, it was reported that some companies, including iZUP, ZoomSafer, Aegis Mobility, and cellcontrol by obdEdge employ systems that place restrictions on cell phone usage based on the phone's GPS signal, data from the car itself or from nearby cellphone towers. Also, companies like TextNoMore offer an opt-in solution that rewards users for activating.

The use of telematics to detect drunk driving and texting while driving has been proposed. A US patent application combining this technology with a usage based insurance product was open for public comment on peer to patent. The insurance product would not bar texting while driving, but would charge drivers who text and drive a higher premium.

In recent years, location-based technologies that detect potential texting while driving situations have been developed for both the Android operating system and the iPhone operating system (iOS). Other technologies have been developed for law enforcement. A search for "no texting while driving" in Google Play or in the Apple App Store will find several applications that promote safer driving, either through blocking texts, auto-responding or by educating drivers to the dangers of texting while driving. Some of these apps are "paired" and require installation of the app on both the parents' phone and the driver's phones. Paired apps allow remote monitoring of a driver's actions.

Android operating system: In addition to Android Auto, there are apps that utilize the GPS and Network Location services of Android mobile phones to estimate the speed that the cell phone is travelling at the time text messages are sent. As noted before, some of these apps are "paired". One example of a paired app is "TextWatcher". The recommended approach for this app is for parents to install the app on their children's Android mobile phone to silently monitor texting, to send alerts when potential texting while driving situations occur, and to counsel phone holders (in this case, teenage drivers) after the fact. Another app, "Textecution", determines when the phone is traveling higher than 10 mph and shuts down texting abilities. "TextDrive" is an Android application that automatically replies to incoming messages and reads them aloud while driving, with support for SMS, WhatsApp, Telegram, Gmail, Facebook Messenger, Skype, and Slack, allowing drivers to keep their eyes on the road.

iPhone operating system (iOS): Apple iPhones using iOS 11 or later have a built-in feature called "Do Not Disturb While Driving". This feature is part of the operating system and does not need to be added or downloaded separately. It uses parameters such as motion detection and network connections to detect driving and can be activated in the iPhone's "Do Not Disturb" settings. To find this feature, tap the "Settings" icon, and then scroll down to "Do Not Disturb". Next, scroll down to "Do Not Disturb While Driving". Once turned on, it will block incoming text messages while the car is being driven. It will also auto-respond to those texts with a customizable message that lets senders know that a person is driving and cannot receive text messages. It can be set to activate in one of three ways: automatically detect driving, activate when connected by Bluetooth to a hands-free device, or it can be set to be activated manually.

Law enforcement: Over the past few months, various state police forces in Australia have started trial use of cameras that have the ability to pick up errant drivers from more than 500 metres away. Police in Western Australia make use of undercover motorcycles to keep an eye on other motorists and any offence will be recorded on the motorcycle officer's helmet camera. Police in India have become more aggressive on a wide variety of traffic violations and once again, there is a widespread use of cameras.

== See also ==
- Behavioral modernity
- Distracted driving
- Evolutionary mismatch
- Mobile phones and driving safety
- Passenger problem
- Death by GPS
- List of selfie-related injuries and deaths
