= Acusensus =

Technology company developing distracted driving prevention

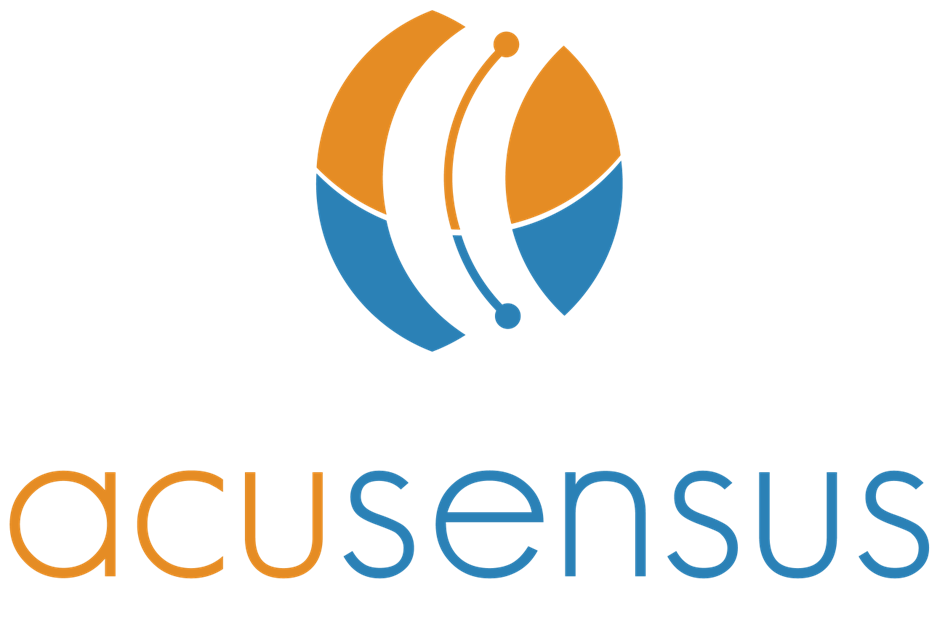
- Industry: Artificial Intelligence
- Founded: 2018
- Founders: Alexander Jannink and Ravin Mirchandani
- Headquarters: Queen Street, Melbourne, Australia,
- Number of employees: 105
- Website: www.acusensus.com

Acusensus is a technology company that provides automated recognition of drivers using mobile phones while driving in order to enforce traffic safety laws intended to prevent distracted driving.

== History ==
Acusensus was founded in 2018 by Alexander Jannink and Ravin Mirchandani. It is headquartered in Queen Street, Melbourne, Australia. Jannink was inspired to co-found the company after a friend riding a bicycle was killed by a driver who was allegedly driving drunk and using a mobile phone. Jannink wanted to address issues of road safety, where fatality rates have been increasing since 2013. With Mirchandani, the chairman of Ador Powertron, an Indian industrial electronics company, raised $600,000 to launch the company, and enrolled it in an accelerator program at the University of Melbourne.

== Partnership ==
In 2018, Acusensus led a three-month-long trial in partnership with Transport for NSW to test its technology for detecting the illegal use of mobile phones while driving, such as texting or accepting incoming calls while holding the phone. The trial was a success, detecting the illegal use of mobile phones by 11,000 drivers, who were issued warning letters. It was followed by an operational pilot in two Sydney locations from January to April 2019. Transport for NSW believes the pilot to have been the first of its kind in the world. It successfully detected 100,000 drivers using a mobile device illegally among 8,500,000 vehicles checked.

The project drew scrutiny from the state's Privacy Commissioner, who raised concerns about the legality of collecting personal information of every individual in a vehicle that passed the pilot's cameras, even those that were determined to be non-offenders, and urged Transport for NSW to develop a policy that balanced the public interest in improving road safety with the risk of privacy harms. Transport for NSW made the program permanent starting in December 2019. During the first three months, violators received warning letters, and enforcement via fines and demerit points began on 1 March 2020.

== Recognition ==
Acusensus's technology has since been used in similar pilots in the United Kingdom and Canada, and in a New South Wales trial that examined compliance with stop signs at railway crossings. In January 2023, Acusensus listed on the Australian Securities Exchange.
