= Mobile phones and driving safety =

Cell phone use during driving and its safety

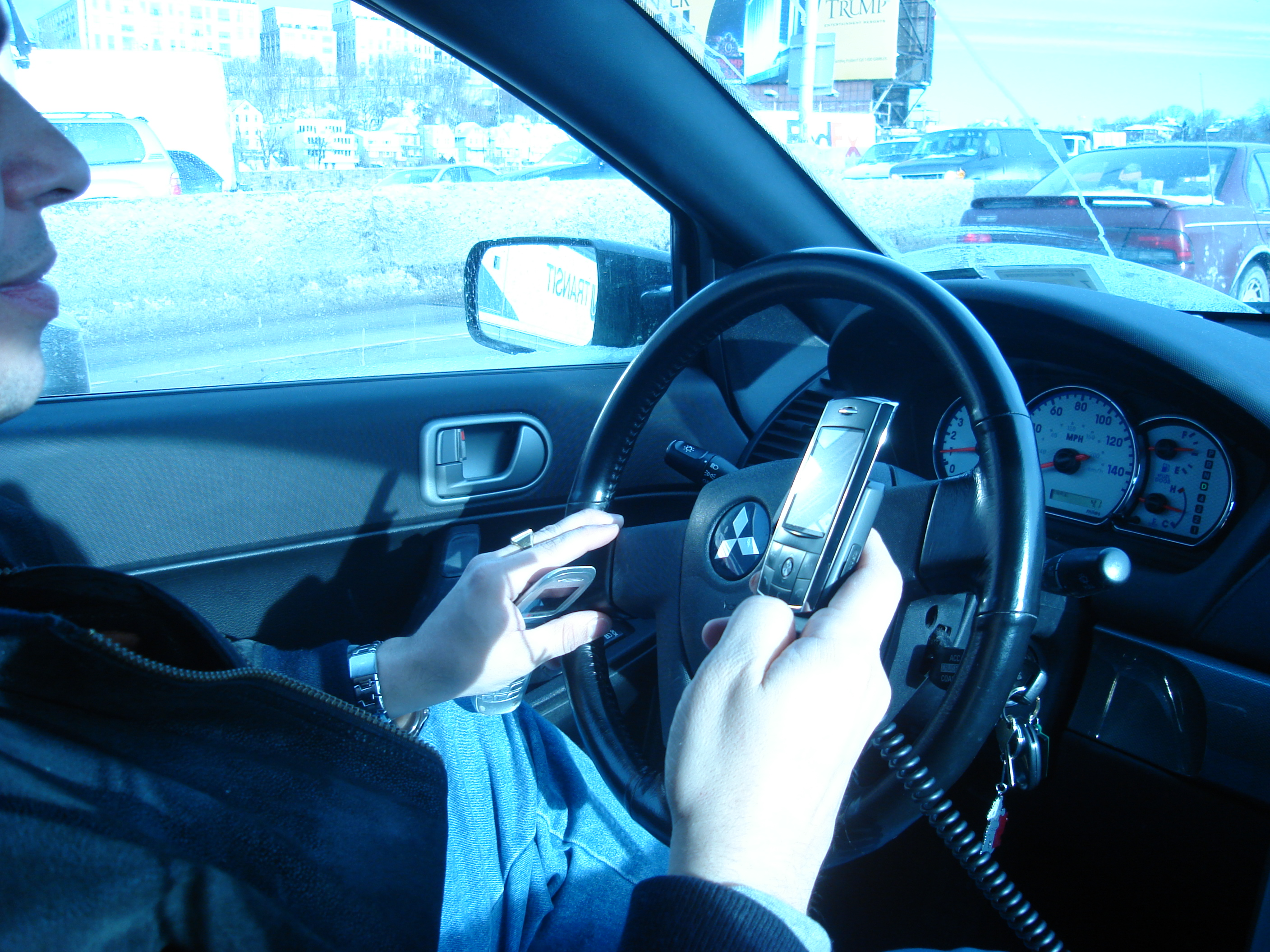
A New York driver using two hand-held mobile phones at once while in a traffic jam

Mobile phone use while driving is common but it is dangerous due to its potential for causing distracted driving and subsequent crashes. Due to the number of crashes that are related to conducting calls on a phone and texting while driving, some jurisdictions have made the use of calling on a phone while driving illegal in an attempt to curb the practice, with varying levels of efficacy. Many jurisdictions have enacted laws making handheld mobile phone use illegal. Many jurisdictions allow use of a hands-free while using a hands-free device has been found by some studies to provide little to no benefit versus holding the device itself and carrying on a conversation. In some cases restrictions are directed only at minors, those who are newly qualified license holders (particularly those of a younger age), or to drivers in school zones. In addition to voice calling, activities such as texting while driving, web browsing, playing video games, or phone use in general may also increase the risk of a crash.

In the United States, automobile crashes due to distracted driving are increasing even after the passage of laws intended to lessen such use while driving. Using a cell phone while driving increases the driver's risk of causing a crash. Drivers can become distracted, decreasing the driver's awareness on the road, leading to more car crashes. When drivers talk on cell phones the risk of an automobile crash resulting in hospitalization is four times higher than when not talking on a cell phone. Drivers who text when behind the wheel are twenty-three times more likely to have an automobile crash.

== Studies ==
=== Prevalence ===
Legality of mobile phone use while driving: Illegal in all cases Hands-on illegal, hands-free legal Talking legal, texting illegal Phone use legal No data Note: While Portugal is in black on the map, in Portugal Legislation requires use of hands-free equipment, in 2018.

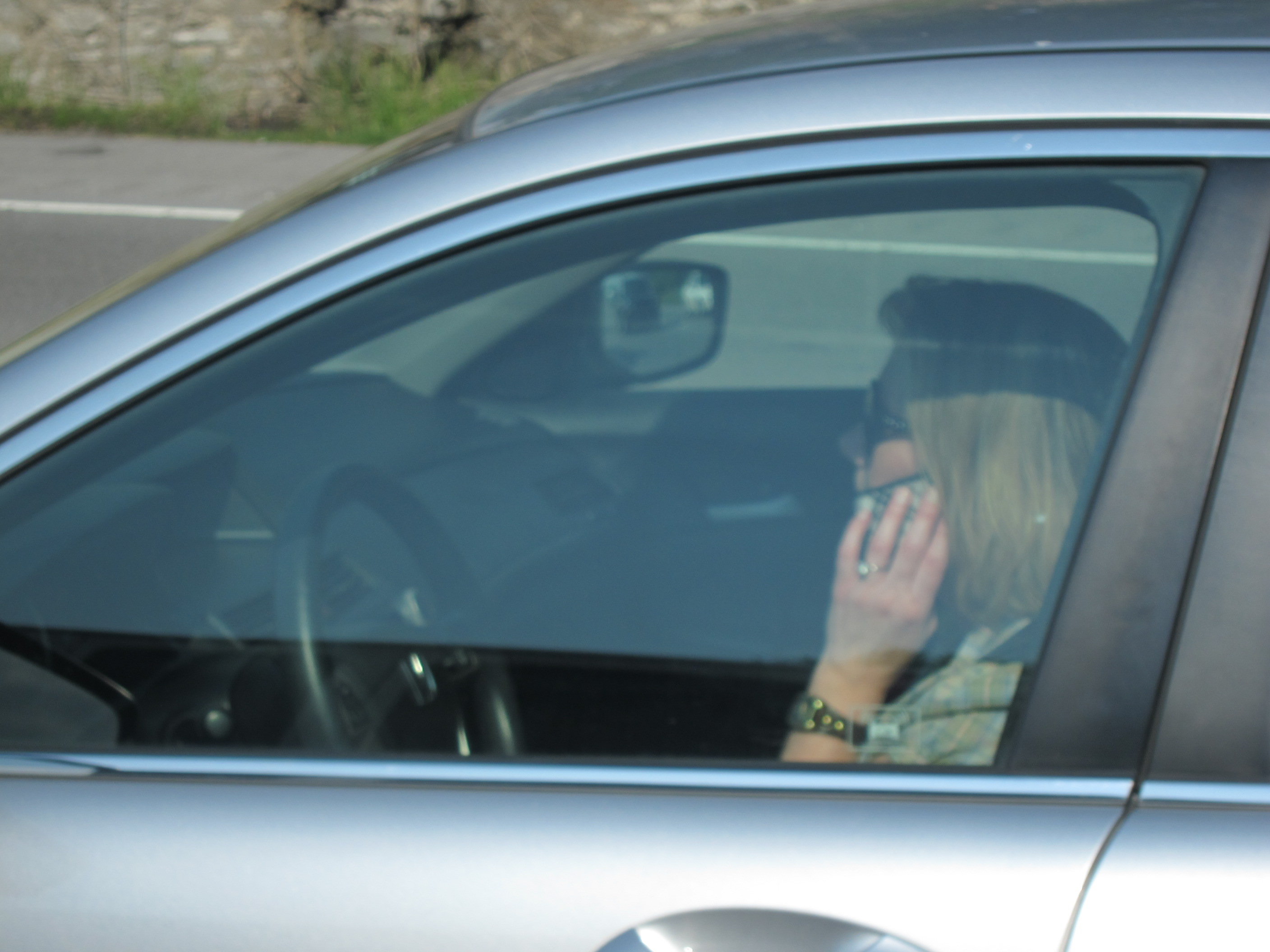
A driver using a cellphone

The Société de l'assurance automobile du Québec (SAAQ), the provincial automobile insurance association in Quebec, conducted a study on driving and cellphones in 2003. Questionnaires were sent to 175,000 drivers and analysis was done on the 36,078 who responded. The questionnaire asked about driving habits, risk exposure, collisions over the past 24 months, socio-demographic information, and cell phone use. Questionnaires were supported with data from cell phone companies and crash records held by police. The study found that the overall relative risk (RR) of having a crash for cell phone users when compared to non-cell phone users averaged 1.38 across all groups. When adjusted for distance driven per year and other crash risk exposures, RR was 1.11 for men and 1.21 for women. They also found that increased cell phone use correlated with an increase in RR. When the same data were reanalyzed using a Bayesian approach, the calculated RR of 0.78 for those making less than 1 call/day and 2.27 for those with more than 7 calls/day was similar to cohort analysis. When the data were reanalyzed using case-crossover analysis, RR was calculated at a much higher 5.13. The authors expressed concern that misclassification of phone call and cell phone usage due to reporting errors of the exact time of the collisions was a major source of bias with all case-crossover analysis of this issue.

In March 2011, the US insurance company State Farm Insurance announced the results of a study which showed 19% of drivers surveyed accessed the Internet on a smart phone while driving. In September 2010, the US National Highway Traffic Safety Administration (NHTSA) released a report on distracted driving fatalities for 2009. The NHTSA considers distracted driving to include some of the following as distractions: other occupants in the car, eating, drinking, smoking, adjusting radio, adjusting environmental control, reaching for object in car, and cell phone use. In 2009 in the US, there was a reported 5,474 people killed by distracted drivers. Of those, 995 were considered to be killed by drivers distracted by cell phones. The report does not state whether this under- or overrepresents the level of cell phone use amongst drivers, and whether there is a causal relationship.

A 2003 study of US crash data states that driver inattention is estimated to be a factor in 25% to 50% of all police-reported crashes. Driver distraction, a sub-category of inattention, has been estimated to be a contributing factor in 8% to 13% of all crashes. Of distraction-related crashes, cell phone use may range from 1.5 to 5% of contributing factors. However, large unknowns in each category may increase the inaccuracy of these estimates. A 2001 study sponsored by the American Automobile Association recorded "Unknown Driver Attention Status" for 41.5% of crashes, and "Unknown Distraction" in 8.6% of all distraction related crashes. According to NHTSA, "There is clearly inadequate reporting of crashes".

Currently, being distracted by an "outside person, object, event" (commonly known as "rubbernecking") is the most reported cause of distraction-related crashes, followed by "adjusting radio/cassette/CD". "Using/dialing cell phone" is eighth. A 2003 study by the University of Utah psychology department measured response time, following distance, and driving speed of a control group, subjects at the legal blood alcohol content (BAC) limit of 0.08%, and subjects involved in cell phone conversations. As the study notes; "... this is the third in a series of studies that we have conducted evaluating the effects of cell phone use on driving using the car following procedure (see also Strayer & Drews, 2004; and Strayer et al., 2003). Across these three studies, 120 participants performed in both baseline and cell phone conditions. Two of the participants in our studies were involved in a crash in baseline conditions, whereas 10 participants were involved in a crash when they were conversing on a cell phone." However, no drunk driver had a crash in any test. After controlling for driving difficulty and time on task, the study concluded that cell phone drivers exhibited greater impairment than drunk drivers.

=== Meta-analyses ===
A 2005 review by the Hawaii House of Representatives entitled "Cell Phone Use and Motor Vehicle Collisions: A Review of the Studies" contains an analysis of studies on cell phone/motor vehicle crash causality. A key finding was that: "No studies were found that directly address and resolve the issue of whether a causal relation exists between cellular telephone use while operating a motor vehicle and motor vehicle collisions." Meta-analysis by the Canadian Automobile Association and the University of Illinois found that response time while using both hands-free and hand-held phones was approximately 0.5 standard deviations higher than normal driving (i.e. an average driver, while talking on a cell phone, has response times of a driver in roughly the 40th percent

=== Problematic mobile phone use ===
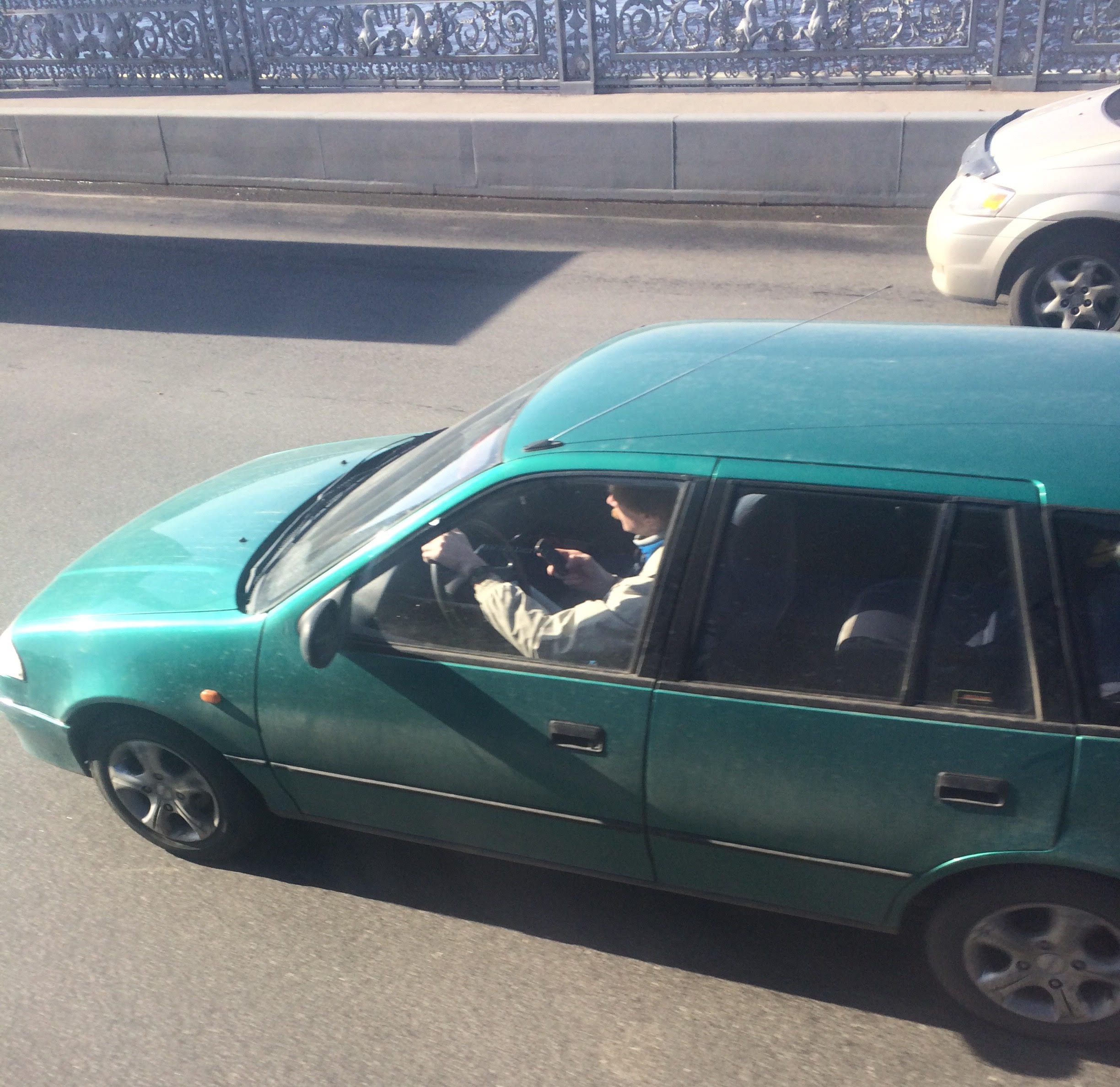
A driver using a mobile phone

An association between problematic mobile phone use and a greater risk of simultaneous mobile phone use and road use and risk of vehicle collisions and pedestrian collisions or falls has been found.

=== Arguments from increase in mobile subscription ===
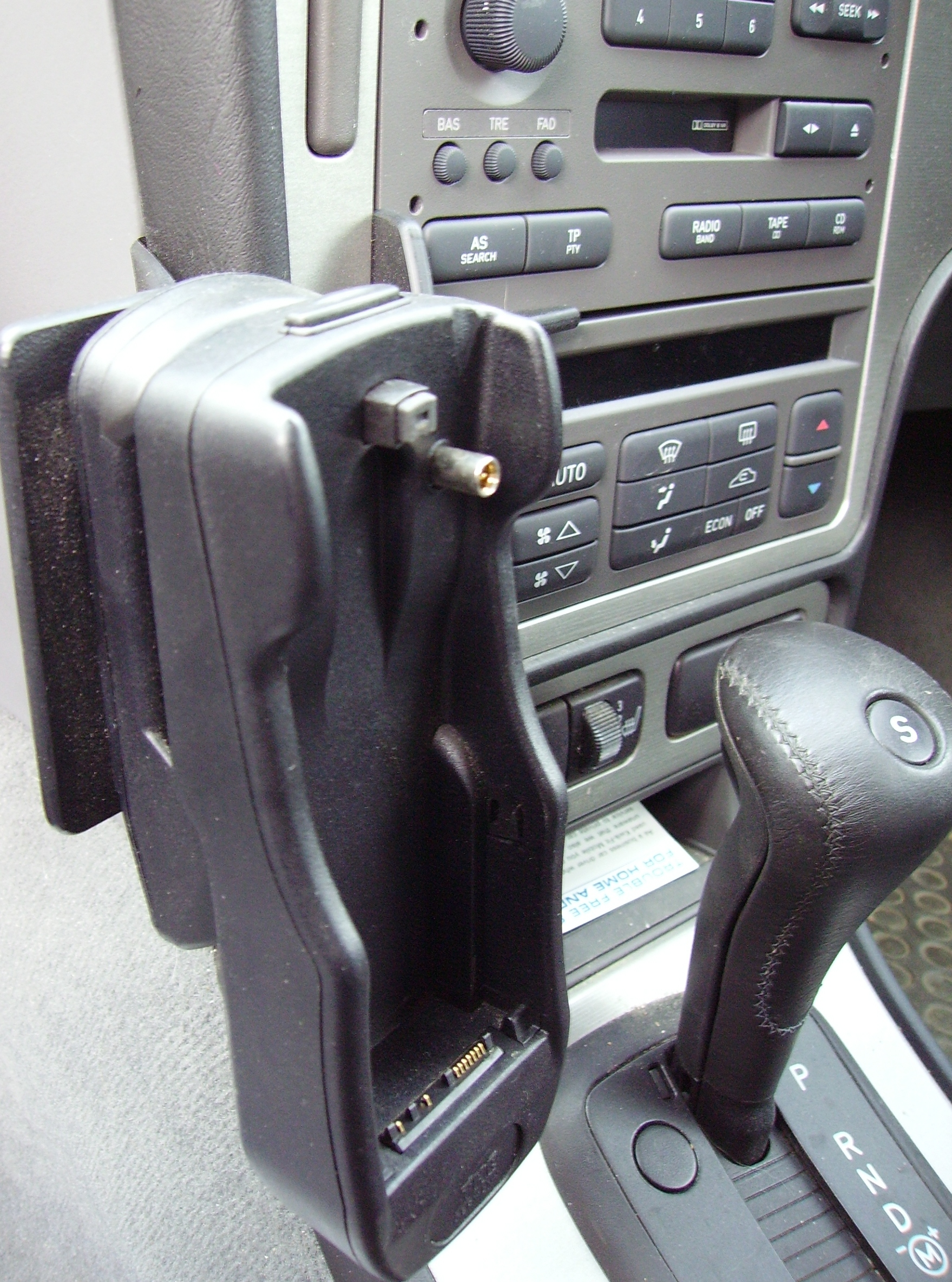
Hands-free car kit

In the US, the number of cell phone subscribers has increased by 1,262.4% between the years 1985-2008. In approximately the same period the number of crashes has fallen by 0.9% (1995–2009) and the number of fatal crashes fallen by 6.2%. It has been argued that these statistics contradict the claims that mobile use impairs driving performance. Similarly, a 2010 study from the Highway Loss Data Institute published in February 2010 reviewed auto claims from three key states along with Washington, D.C., prior to cell phone bans while driving and then after. The study found no reduction in crashes, despite a 41% to 76% reduction in the use of cell phones while driving after the ban was enacted.

=== Handsfree device ===
Driving while using a handsfree cellular device is not safer than using a hand held cell phone, as concluded by case-crossover studies, epidemiological, simulation, and meta-analysis. The increased cognitive workload involved in holding a conversation, not the use of hands, causes the increased risk. For example, a Carnegie Mellon University study found that merely listening to somebody speak on a phone caused a 37% drop in activity in the parietal lobe, where spatial tasks are managed.

==== The United Kingdom ====
In the UK using a mobile phone while driving has been illegal since 2003, unless it is in a handsfree kit. The penalty originally started with a £30 ($40) fine which later became a fine of £60 ($80) plus 3 penalty points in 2006, then £100 ($134) and 3 points in 2013. The 2013 fine increase proved ineffective at stopping motorists from using their phones while driving. The percentage of drivers admitting to using their phones while on the road increased from 8% in 2014 to 31% in 2016, an increase of 23% in two years. In the same year statistics revealed that only 30,000 drivers were given a Fixed penalty notice (FPN) for the offence, compared to 123,000 in 2011. The increased percentage of people using their phones can be attributed in part to the growing affordability of smartphones. Increased smartphone sales and lack of enforcement created a situation where it began to be considered acceptable to use a phone while driving, even though it had been illegal for over 13 years.

In 2017 the Department of transport (DfT) decided to increase the penalties to a £200 ($268) fine with 6 penalty points as a result of the growing acceptance of phone use while driving. This would mean that motorists who perhaps already had 6 points on their driving licence, would be disqualified from driving for 6 months if caught. The biggest detriment would be for newly qualified drivers who have passed their driving tests within the last two years. New drivers have conditions on their licence for two years after passing their test in the UK, with the most significant being that if they gain 6 penalty points on their licence they have to fully retake their driving test. Licence holders after 2 years have 12 points until licence disqualification in most circumstances rather than a ban/retest. The decision to make the penalty 6 points rather than 4 or 5 was likely made to deter young/new drivers from using their phones while driving, as they were observed to be one of the largest age groups committing the offence. A year after the stricter law came in, a smaller 23% of motorists had admitted to using a phone while driving, an 8% reduction compared to 2 years ago. Studies will continue to monitor whether or not this habit persist among motorists as it has done throughout the past, while the British government aims to make picking up your phone as socially unacceptable as drink driving.

=== Comparisons with passenger conversations ===
The scientific literature is mixed on the dangers of talking on a cell phone versus those of talking with a passenger. The common conception is that passengers are able to better regulate conversation based on the perceived level of danger, therefore the risk is negligible. A study by a University of South Carolina psychology researcher featured in the journal, Experimental Psychology, found that planning to speak and speaking put far more demands on the brain's resources than listening. Measurement of attention levels showed that subjects were four times more distracted while preparing to speak or speaking than when they were listening. The Accident Research Unit at the University of Nottingham found that the number of utterances was usually higher for mobile calls when compared to blindfolded and non-blindfolded passengers across various driving conditions. The number of questions asked averaged slightly higher for mobile phone conversations, although results were not constant across road types and largely influenced by a large number of questions on the urban roads.

A 2004 simulation study that compared passenger and cell-phone conversations concluded that the driver performs better when conversing with a passenger because the traffic and driving task become part of the conversation. Drivers holding conversations on cell phones were four times more likely to miss the highway exit than those with passengers, and drivers conversing with passengers showed no statistically significant difference from lone drivers in the simulator. A study led by Andrew Parkes at the Transport Research Laboratory, also with a driving simulator, concluded that hands-free phone conversations impair driving performance more than other common in-vehicle distractions such as passenger conversations. However, some have criticized the use of simulation studies to measure the risk of cell-phone use while driving since the studies may be impacted by the Hawthorne effect.

In contrast, the University of Illinois meta-analysis concluded that passenger conversations were just as costly to driving performance as cell phone ones. AAA ranks passengers as the third most reported cause of distraction-related crashes at 11%, compared to 1.5% for cellular telephones. A simulation study funded by the American Transportation Research Board concluded that driving events that require urgent responses may be influenced by in-vehicle conversations, and that there is little practical evidence that passengers adjusted their conversations to changes in the traffic. It concluded that drivers' training should address the hazards of both mobile phone and passenger conversations.

=== Texting ===
The scientific literature on the dangers of driving while sending a text message from a mobile phone, or texting while driving, is limited. A simulation study at the Monash University Accident Research Centre has provided strong evidence that both retrieving and, in particular, sending text messages has a detrimental effect on a number of critical driving tasks. Specifically, negative effects were seen in detecting and responding correctly to road signs, detecting hazards, time spent with eyes off the road, and (only for sending text messages) lateral position. Surprisingly, mean speed, speed variability, lateral position when receiving text messages, and following distance showed no difference.

The low number of scientific studies may be indicative of a general assumption that if talking on a mobile phone increases risk, then texting also increases risk, and probably more so. Market research by Pinger, a company selling a voice-based alternative to texting reported that 89% of US adults think that text messaging while driving is "distracting, dangerous and should be outlawed." The AAA Foundation for Traffic Safety released polling data in 2009 that showed 87% of people consider texting and e-mailing while driving a "very serious" safety threat, almost equivalent to the 90% of those polled who consider drunk driving a threat. Despite the acknowledgement of the dangers of texting behind the wheel, about half of drivers 16 to 24 say they have texted while driving, compared with 22% of drivers 35 to 44.

Texting while driving received greater attention in the late 2000s, corresponding to a rise in the number of text messages being sent. Over a year approximately 2,000 teens die from texting while driving. Texting while driving attracted interest in the media after several highly publicized car crashes were caused by texting drivers, including a May 2009 incident involving a Boston tram driver who crashed while texting his girlfriend. Texting was blamed in the 2008 Chatsworth train collision which killed 25 passengers. Investigations revealed that the driver of that train had sent 45 text messages while at the controls.

In a 2011 study it was reported that over 90% of college students surveyed text (initiate, reply or read) while driving. On July 27, 2009, the Virginia Tech Transportation Institute released preliminary findings of their study of driver distraction in commercial vehicles. Two studies, comprising about 200 long-haul trucks driving 3 million combined miles, used video cameras to observe the drivers and road; researchers observed "4,452 safety-critical events, which includes crashes, near-crashes, crash-relevant conflicts, and unintended lane deviations." 81% of the safety-critical events had some type of driver distraction. Text messaging had the greatest relative risk, with drivers being 23 times more likely to experience a safety-critical event when texting. The study also found that drivers typically take their eyes off the forward roadway for an average of four out of six seconds when texting, and an average of 4.6 out of the six seconds surrounding safety-critical events.

=== Internet surfing ===
In 2013 it was reported that, according to a national survey in the US, the number of drivers who reported using their cellphones to access the internet while driving had risen to nearly one of four.

=== Intervention ===
A study conducted by the University of Vienna using the theory of planned behavior identified two key determinants of high-level mobile phone use. Those two factors, subjective norm (i.e., perceived social norms) and self-identity (i.e., the degree to which individuals see mobile phones as a part of their self), might be promising targets for the development of persuasive strategies and other interventions aimed at reducing inappropriate and problematic use of mobile phones, such as using mobile phones while driving.

== Public economics ==
=== Social economic costs ===
Mobile phone use while driving has economic impacts. Using a mobile phone while driving can definitely have economic costs to the driver using the phone (ex. paying for costs of collision, losing pay if late to work from distracted driving, etc.). More interesting however is how a driver's mobile phone use while driving can have external effects on both other drivers' safety and other drivers' economic property. Specifically, mobile phone use while driving produces negative consumption externalities where the consumer's (driver's) use of the phone while driving can reduce the well-being of others who are not paid by the consumer (i.e. outside the market mechanism). Mobile phone use can cause drivers to take their eyes off the road, minds off the road, and hands off the steering wheel. These consumer distractions can negatively affect others in many ways such as collision or even fatality due to consumer distraction, congestion on the road due to slower driving speeds because of multitasking, and tardiness of those affected by the externality because of others' distracted driving. The negative consumption externalities produced from mobile phone use while driving not only affects others on the road but also causes economic inefficiencies. Externalities are a form of market failure where, by definition, the market fails to deliver an efficient outcome.

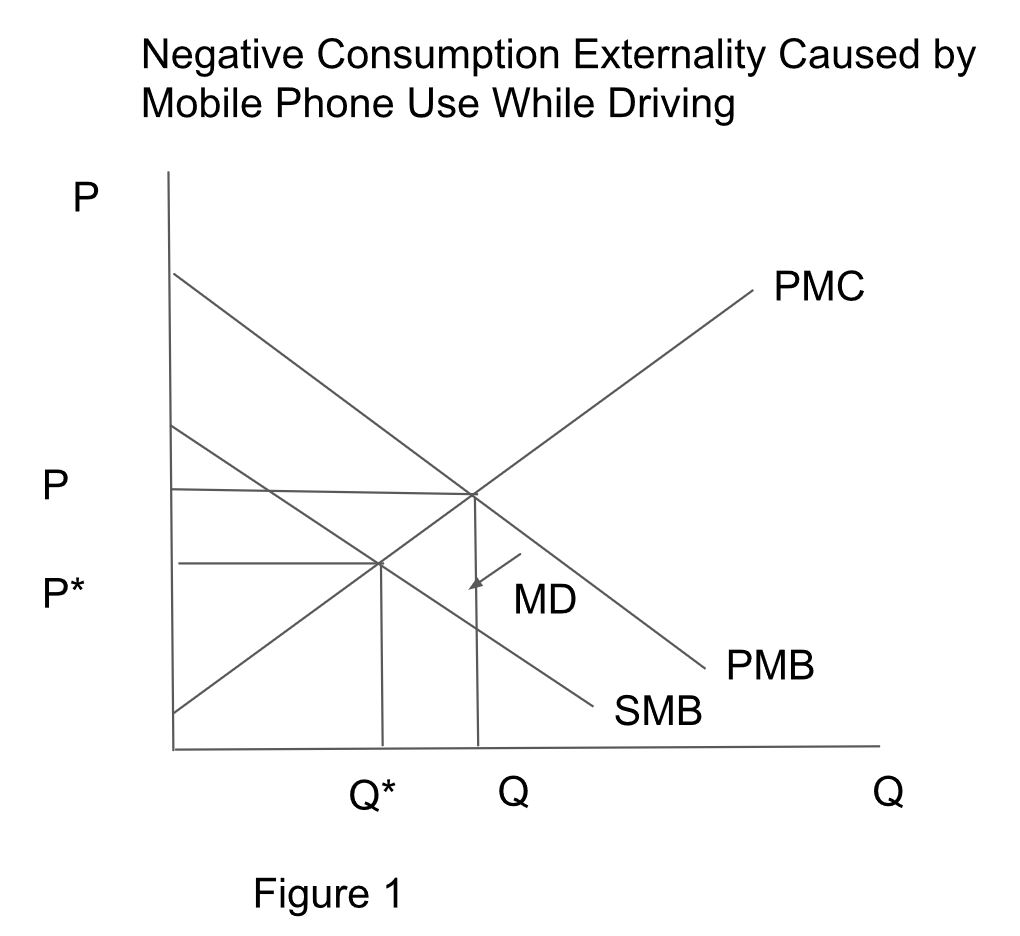

Figure 1 details the effects of this negative externality. In this case, the market quantity is too high where there are too many that use their mobile phone while driving. The socially optimal quantity (Q*) is thus lower than the market quantity (Q). To overcome this inefficiency, governments often must get involved and regulate price or quantity.

=== Legislation and social economic benefits ===
While there is no feasible way to ensure that driver's attention remains sufficiently focused on driving, there are ways that the government can intervene legislatively to discourage drivers from engaging in behaviors that potentially distract them from driving. In cases of a negative consumption externality such as mobile phone use while driving, the government will usually impose a ban by way of price burden, in this case a fine or ticket, in order to reduce the market quantity to a socially optimal quantity. An illustration of this intervention can be found below (Figure 2) where, in this case, the government has the ability to fine or ticket those who use a phone while driving in order to reduce the number of distracted drivers on the road. As illustrated, the market quantity (Q) of distracted driver's produced by mobile phone use while driving is too high and the socially optimal point for society is lower. Thus a ticket or some sort of price burden is put in place to reduce the market quantity to the socially optimal quantity (Q*).

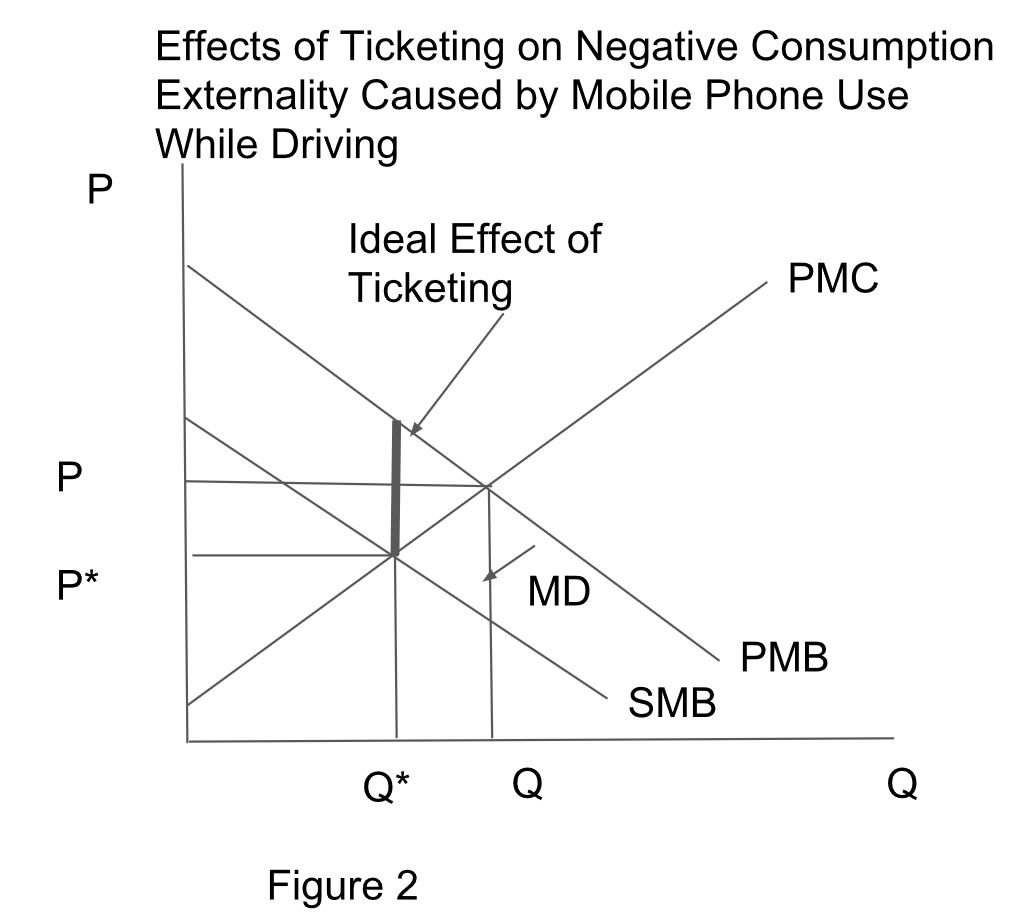

The negative consumption externalities caused by mobile phone use while driving, as shown, has economic costs. Not only does mobile phone use while driving jeopardize safety for the driver, anyone in the car, or others on the road but it also produces economic costs to all parties involved. As shown, these costs are best managed with government intervention through policy or legislation changes. Ticketing is often the best choice as it affects only those who are caught performing the illegal act. Ticketing is another cost induced from mobile phone use and driving because ticketing laws for this act have only been put into place due to the large number of crashes caused by distracted drivers due to mobile phone use. Further, not only are the tickets costly to individuals who receive them but so is the price that must be paid to enforce the prohibition of mobile phone use while driving. Key to the success of a legislative measure is the ability to maintain and sustain them through enforcement or the perception of enforcement. Police officer and photo radar cameras are other costs that must be paid in order to reduce this externality.

=== Social economic benefits ===
While paying tickets may be an undesired cost to pay by those who are given the ticket, ticket payments can actually have positive impacts in reducing the externality (discussed above) and increasing the total welfare of society. Ticket revenue often goes to state or local needs. For example, revenue from tickets can be used to improve local/state infrastructure and public schooling.

The effects of ticketing this negative consumption externality of mobile phone use while driving can be seen below. The graph shows the implementation of a ticket as having the same effect of a Pigouvian tax.

While this is the goal of the ticket, that is, to have the same effect of a Pigouvian tax which is intended to correct an inefficient market outcome, and does so by being set equal to the social cost of the negative externalities, that us usually not the case of a ticket. Tickets only affect those who receive the ticket while a tax effects all. The graphs shows ticket implementation as having the same effect as a Pigouvian tax. This is the ideal revenue brought in by ticketing as that is the price burden that will bring the socially optimal quantity. While this is ideal, this is very unlikely to happen through ticketing because, with ticketing, one must factor in the probability of someone receiving the ticket and multiple that probability by the price. The graph does not show this theoretical situation because the data of how often tickets are given for mobile phone use while driving is not conclusive.

While ticketing can be tricky to apply, the revenue brought in by ticket is a benefit to society as it can be used for local and state needs and will help reduce the externality.

== Legislation ==
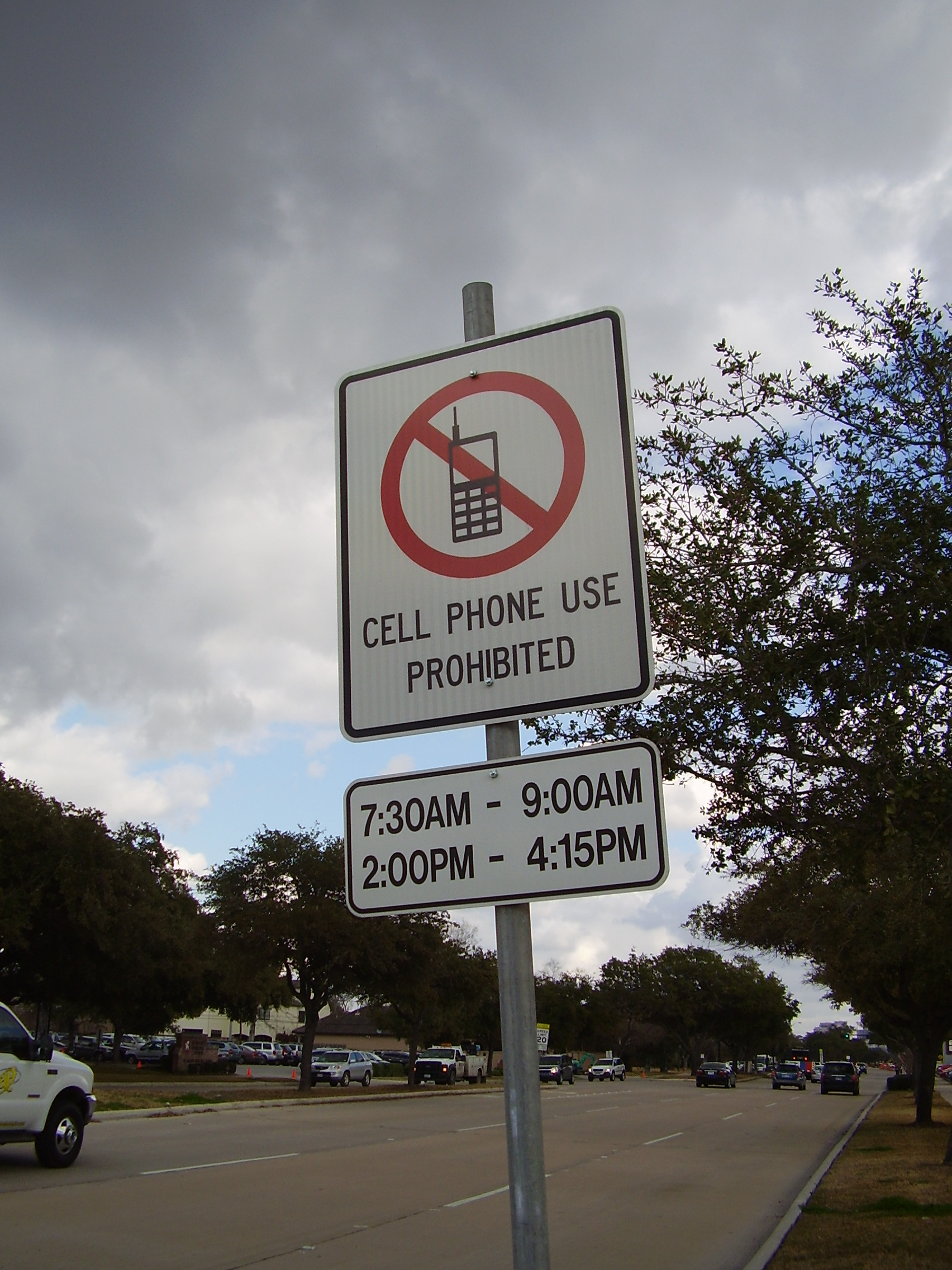
A sign along Bellaire Boulevard in Southside Place, Texas (Greater Houston) states that using mobile phones while driving is prohibited from 7:30 am to 9:00 am and from 2:00 pm to 4:15 pm.

Crashes involving a driver being distracted by talking on a mobile phone have begun to be prosecuted as negligence similar to speeding. In the United Kingdom, from 1 March 2017, motorists who are caught using a hand-held mobile phone while driving will have six penalty points added to their license in addition to the fine of £200. This increase was introduced to try to stem the increase in drivers ignoring the law. Japan prohibits hand-held mobile phone or mobile device use while driving. New Zealand has banned hand held mobile phone use since 1 November 2009. Many states in the United States have banned texting on cell phones while driving. Some states allow for drivers to use a cell phone mount but some states do not. Illinois became the seventeenth U.S. state to enforce this law. As of July 2010, 30 states had banned texting while driving, with Kentucky becoming the most recent addition on July 15.

Public Health Law Research maintains a list of distracted driving laws in the United States. This database of laws provides a comprehensive view of the provisions of laws that restrict the use of mobile communication devices while driving for all 50 states and the District of Columbia between 1992, when first law was passed, through December 1, 2010. The dataset contains information on 22 dichotomous, continuous or categorical variables including, for example, activities regulated (e.g., texting versus talking, hands-free versus handheld), targeted populations, and exemptions.

In 2014, various state police forces in Australia have trialed cameras which have the ability to pick up errant drivers from more than 500 metres (1,600 ft) away. Police in Western Australia makes use of undercover motorcycles to keep an eye on other motorists and any offence will be recorded on the officer's helmet camera. Other countries with high levels of car crashes relating to distracted driving are also considering similar measures.

NSW road rules were changed on 1 December 2016 for P2 drivers. Learner, P1 and P2 drivers must not use mobile phones for any function while driving or riding or while stationary (at traffic lights). Drivers must be parked out of traffic to use their phones.

The Road Transport Legislation Amendment (Mobile Phones—P2 Licences) Regulation 2016 under the Road Transport Act 2013 enforces this new rule and the objects of this Regulation sought: (a) to amend the Road Rules 2014 to extend the restriction on drivers who are holders of learner or provisional P1 licences from using a mobile phone while driving a vehicle (whether or not the mobile phone is held by the driver) to include drivers who are holders of provisional P2 licences, and (b) to make consequential amendme nts to the Road Transport (Driver Licensing) Regulation 2008.

This Regulation was made under the Road Transport Act 2013.

Prior to the introduction of this new law on 1 December 2016, only learner and P1 provisional licence-holders were barred from using mobile phones in any capacity while driving, as P2 drivers faced the same restrictions as other licence-holders.

=== List of countries with bans ===
==== Hand-held and hands-free ====
Countries where using either a hand-held or hands-free phone while driving is illegal:

- United States – Laws regarding cell phone use while driving are set state by state. While no state bans the use of all cell phones for all adult drivers of non-commercial vehicles at all times, many states ban all cell phone use by young drivers and/or commercial drivers. Many states have a combination of bans of texting and hand-held cell phone use. See Restrictions on cell phone use while driving in the United States for details.

==== Hand-held only ====
Countries where using a hand-held phone while driving is illegal:

- Argentina
- Australia: All states and territories.
  - New South Wales – Offenders will be penalised five demerit points with a $362 fine for illegally using their mobile phone, or $481 if detected in a school zone. During double demerit periods, such as Christmas Day, New Year's Day and Easter, drivers will be penalised ten demerit points.
  - Queensland – The fine for using a mobile while driving will rise to $1,252 (up $42) on July 1st 2025. Along with the fine, you will lose 4 demerit points. If the driver is caught twice within a year, they'll be fined with another $1,252 fine and 8 demerit points. This makes it one of the highest in the world.
  - Victoria – The penalties if the driver is caught using a mobile phone whilst driving are 4 demerit points and a $555 fine. If the matter is heard at court, the fine for illegal mobile phone/device use can be as much as $1,849.
  - Western Australia – The fine for touching or holding a mobile phone while not in a cradle to make, receive or end a voice call is $500 and 3 demerit points. Creating, sending, or looking at a text, email, social media, photo, video or similar will incur a $1,000 fine and 4 demerit points.
  - Australian Capital Territory – The fine for using your device to make or receive calls is $498 and 3 demerit points. The fine for messaging, social networking, accessing apps or the internet is $612 and 4 demerit points.
  - Northern Territory – Driving whilst using a mobile will cost the driver 3 demerit points and a $500 fine.
  - South Australia – A driver will receive an expiation fee and three demerit points.
  - Tasmania – The fine for using mobile while driving will cost $390 and 3 demerit points.
- Austria - Breaches of the law will be punished by a 100 € fixed penalty notice (Organmandat). If formal charges are issued, the relevant authority can impose a fine of up to 140 €.
- Bahrain - According to the General Directorate of Traffic, those who commit the violation of using a hand-held cell phone while driving could face a fine of BD50 to BD500.
- Barbados - At present, the Road Traffic Amendment Act prohibits any person from driving a vehicle while at the same time holding, manipulating, talking on, or using a cellular phone, and anyone found guilty of violating this provision of the law faces a $2 000 fine, 18 months in jail or both.
- Belgium - Using a mobile phone behind the wheel is a punishable offence, a person can be fined €174.
- Bosnia and Herzegovina
- Brazil – Headphones and Bluetooth devices included.
- Brunei
- Bulgaria
- Canada – Every province and territory except Nunavut:
  - Alberta
  - British Columbia as of 1 January 2010
  - Manitoba as of July 15, 2010
  - New Brunswick as of June 6, 2011
  - Newfoundland and Labrador as of 2003
  - Nova Scotia as of April 8, 2008
  - Prince Edward Island as of 23 January 2010
  - Ontario as of 1 October 2009
  - Quebec
  - Saskatchewan as of January 1, 2010 (plus hands-free for 'new' drivers)
  - Northwest Territories as of January, 2012
  - Yukon as of April 1, 2011
- Chile
- China
- Colombia
- Croatia
- Cyprus
- Czech Republic
- Denmark
- Egypt
- Ethiopia
- Finland
- Estonia
- France
- Georgia
- Germany
- Greece
- Hong Kong
- Hungary
- Iceland
- India – Prohibited across the country: hand held units, hand-free units, reaching for the phone or looking for messages, etc. Strictly enforced in a few states like Karnataka, Kerala, Tamil Nadu, Maharashtra, Delhi, Andhra Pradesh.
- Iran
- Ireland
- Isle of Man
- Israel
- Italy
- Japan – Prohibited for any hand-held mobile device, either talking or texting, except in emergencies.
- Jersey
- Jordan
- Kenya
- Kuwait as of May 1, 2008
- Lithuania
- Malaysia
- Mexico
- Morocco
- Nepal Provision for Rs 200 Npr. fine for each time caught using phone or wireless while driving. One can use after parking on safe place. Traffic Police are mainly based on Kathmandu, Pokhara, Biratnagar, Dharan, Damak and so on.
- Netherlands
- New Zealand - The penalty for using a hand-held mobile phone while driving is $150 and 20 demerit points.
- Norway
- Oman
- Pakistan – Only in:
  - Islamabad
- Philippines (with implementation of Republic Act 10913, or the "Anti-Distracted Driving Act," from May 18, 2017)
- Poland
- Portugal
- Romania
- Russia
- Saudi Arabia
- Serbia
- Singapore (Hands-free allowed provided that hands are not used to answer the call, i.e. voice control/auto-pickup)
- Slovakia
- Slovenia
- South Africa
- South Korea
- Spain
- Sri Lanka
- Switzerland
- Taiwan
- Thailand
- Trinidad and Tobago
- Turkey
- Turkmenistan
- Ukraine
- United Arab Emirates
- United Kingdom
- United States – Only in:
  - Alabama – At least in:
    - The city of Montgomery
  - Arkansas – Statewide ban for drivers between 18 and 20, and all drivers in school zones and road construction areas. In addition:
    - The city of Fort Smith has a blanket ban.
  - California
  - Connecticut
  - Delaware
  - District of Columbia
  - Georgia
  - Hawaii – No state law, but all counties have enacted distracted driving laws that make hand-held phone use illegal.
  - Illinois
  - Louisiana – Drivers with learner's or intermediate licenses, regardless of age.
  - Maryland
  - Massachusetts
  - Michigan
    - The city of Detroit
    - The city of Troy, Michigan
  - Nevada
  - New Hampshire
  - New Jersey
  - New Mexico – Blanket ban in state vehicles statewide & within the city of Albuquerque city limits.
  - New York
  - Oregon
  - Texas – The cities of San Antonio and Austin have a blanket ban effective January 1, 2015 for all hand-held mobile phones, MP3 players, and GPS navigators not permanently affixed to a motor vehicle (e.g. using a smart phone with a GPS navigator app) – civil fines run up to $500.
  - Vermont
  - Washington
  - West Virginia

== See also ==
- Behavioral modernity
- Evolutionary mismatch
- Passenger problem
- Texting while driving
- Death by GPS
- List of selfie-related injuries and deaths
