= Passenger problem =

The passenger problem is the inability of technological systems designed for use in a moving vehicle to differentiate between a driver and a passenger.

The passenger problem arises when such a device or system is intended to function differently when used by a driver versus a passenger, but is unable to autonomously determine the role of its user. The problem is a factor for distracted driving prevention systems, GPS navigation software, and usage-based insurance systems.

== History ==
The term "passenger problem" was first used by technology writer David Pogue in 2010 as part of a series on distracted driving in The New York Times. Reviewing the first generation of distracted driving prevention technologies, Pogue noted their different approaches to the problem: “How can I bypass the block if I’m not the one driving?”

The U.S. Department of Transportation (DOT) acknowledged the passenger problem with the publication of its first set of Distracted Driving Safety Guidelines in 2012. The guidelines applied only to integrated vehicle electronics, recommending the lock-out of dangerous tasks “For any in-vehicle device that is within sight and reach of the driver (even if it is intended for use solely by passengers)…whenever the vehicle’s engine is on and its transmission is not in ‘Park’.” The guidelines intentionally excluded portable devices such as smartphones because of the “special challenges” posed by the fact that their position in the vehicle is not fixed.

In 2014, the National Highway Traffic Safety Administration (NHTSA) convened a public meeting on the subject of distracted driving prevention technologies, expressing its interest “in technology to determine the location of portable and aftermarket devices within the vehicle, thereby automatically determining whether the device is operated by the driver versus passengers while driving” for safety purposes.
