= Distracted driving =

Driving while engaging in other activities

A woman texting while driving before leaving the road and crashing into a mailbox in Washington state.

Distracted driving is the act of driving while engaging in other activities which distract the driver's attention away from the road. Distractions are shown to compromise the safety of the driver, passengers, pedestrians, and people in other vehicles.

Cellular device use while behind the wheel is one of the most common forms of distracted driving. According to the United States Department of Transportation, "texting while driving creates a crash risk 23 times higher than driving while not distracted." Studies and polls regularly find that over 30% of United States drivers had recently texted and driven. Distracted driving is particularly common among, but not exclusive to, younger drivers.

== Types of distractions ==
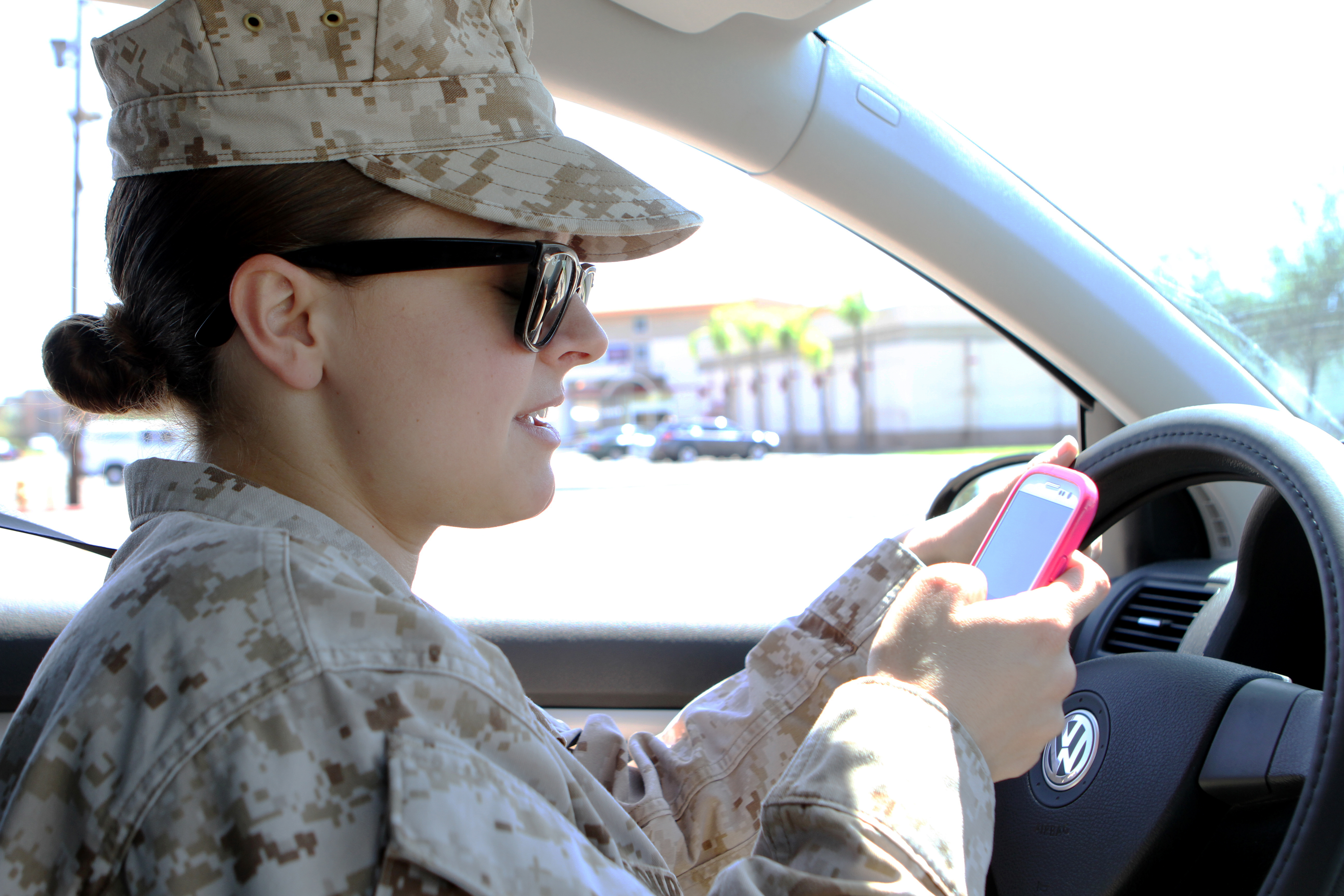
A woman texting while driving (scripted photo from the Defense Visual Information Distribution Service)

Distractions while driving can be separated into three distinct groups: visual, manual, and cognitive. Visual distractions involve taking one's eyes off the road, such as looking at a GPS screen as part of a route plan, looking at roadside billboards, or checking a child's seat belt in the rear view mirror. Manual distractions involve taking one's hands off the wheel, such as searching for something in a bag, eating or drinking, grooming, or changing radio stations. Cognitive distractions occur when an individual is not mentally focused on the act of driving. Some distractions can combine some or all of these groups, such as texting and calling on one's cell phone.

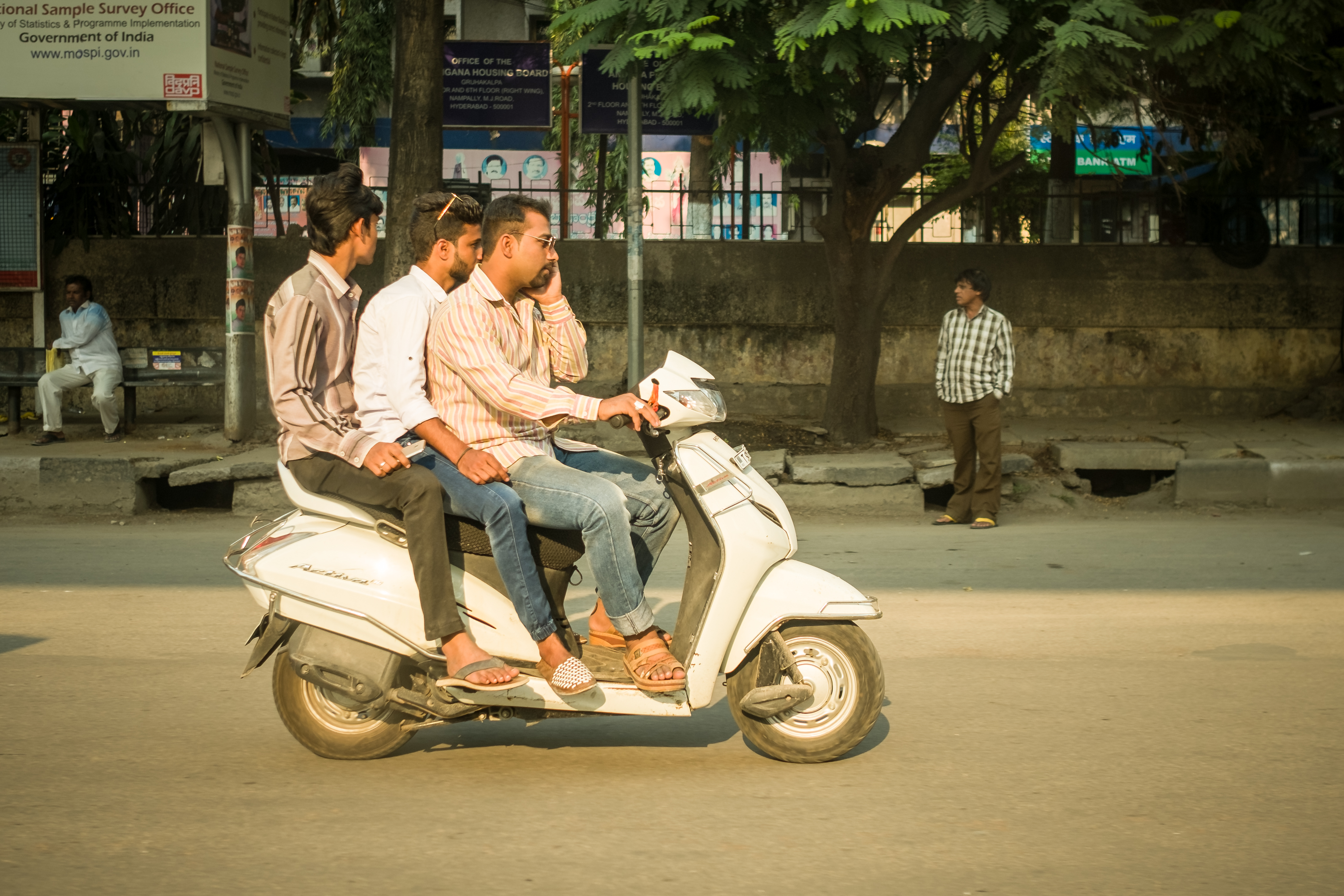
Talking on cell phone while riding a 2 wheeler in Hyderabad, India

Driving distractions can greatly vary in form and severity. They range from the use of cell phones and other electronics to rubbernecking, carrying passengers including children and pets in the vehicle, eating while driving, sexual activity while driving and searching for misplaced items.

Distractions within the vehicle itself can be problematic. New adaptations to technology in vehicles create a higher chance of looking at a screen and taking attention off the road. The extended use of the new automation systems may cause the driver to over-rely on and trust the system, up to the point that they become disengaged completely from the wheel as well as from the road ahead. An experienced driver that is used to the automation systems will be actively engaged in distracted driving.

== Driver distraction in fatal crashes ==
An analysis of United States Fatality Analysis Reporting System (FARS) data for 2010–2013 examined the role of specific distraction types among drivers involved in fatal crashes, excluding drivers impaired by alcohol or drugs. The study identified 13,707 distraction-related drivers out of 178,677 drivers involved in fatal crashes (about 7.7%).

Nineteen distraction codes in FARS were grouped into six categories:

- in‑vehicle technology‑related distractions (such as mobile phones and other electronic devices),
- in‑vehicle non‑technology‑related distractions (such as other occupants or loose objects),
- on‑road distractions (such as people, objects or events outside the vehicle),
- automatic behavioural distractions (for example, eating, drinking or smoking),
- inner cognitive distractions (including inattention, daydreaming and “looked but did not see”), and
- distractions not clearly specified.

Across the four-year period, inner cognitive distractions accounted for the largest share of distraction‑coded fatal crashes, exceeding both external distractions (originating inside or outside the vehicle) and automatic behavioural distractions. The most frequently coded specific factors within distraction‑related fatal crashes were “inattention”, “looked but did not see” and “lost in thought/daydreaming”. In‑vehicle technology‑related distractions formed the largest subgroup among external distractions and were more common than non‑technology‑related in‑vehicle distractions or on‑road distractions.

Over the 2010–2013 period, the proportion of distraction‑related fatal crashes attributed to inner cognitive distractions increased, while the share attributed to unspecified or “unknown” distractions decreased. The share associated with in‑vehicle technology‑related distractions remained smaller in absolute terms but showed a modest increase over time.

== Distraction rates ==
A 2016 U.S. study, published in Preventive Medicine Reports, found that nearly 50 percent of drivers admitted to, while driving, reading a text message, sending a text message, checking their phone for directions, or using social media. Overall, nearly 60 percent of respondents admitted to using their cell phone at least once while driving. Older age was strongly correlated with decreased cell phone distraction scores.

A 2018 survey of more than 3,300 drivers by AAA Foundation for Traffic Safety illustrates a disconnect in driver behavior. While a large percentage of drivers (95.6%) said texting or emailing while driving is unacceptable, nearly half (49%) report talking on a hand-held device and nearly 35% have sent a text or an email while driving.

The US National Highway Traffic Safety Administration (NHTSA) discovered that 35 to 50 percent of drivers admit to using a smartphone while driving and 90 percent of drivers fear those who do.

The Centers for Disease Control and Prevention's 2011 study found that 69% of respondent drivers between the ages of 18 and 64 admitted to calling on the phone while driving in the month before the survey and that 31% sent or read an email or text message.

A Harris Poll survey in February 2015 showed differences in distracted driving by United States region with 24 percent frequency in the Northeast, 28 percent in the Midwest, 30 percent in the West, and 35 percent in the South. 4% more males texted and drove than females. 51 percent of 18- to 34-year-olds texted and drove, 39 percent of 35- to 44-year-olds texted and drove, 33 percent of 45- to 54-year-olds texted and drove, 14 percent of 55- to 64-year-olds texted and drove, and 7 percent of people 65 years old or older texted and drove.

According to a HealthDay poll from November 2011, most adults who drive confess to engaging in distracted driving behaviors. In addition to use of electronic devices, behaviors admitted include eating or drinking, to which 86% of drivers admitted; combing or styling hair, to which at least 20 percent admitted; and applying makeup, to which 14 percent admitted. The poll also reported that younger drivers and males had higher rates of distraction. A study from the president of Hagerty Insurance Agency found that coffee, hot soup, tacos, chili, hamburgers, and barbecued foods were the most dangerous to try and eat while driving.

According to a study by AAA Foundation for Traffic Safety, 15 percent of reported crashes were due to a teenage driver distracted by talking with a passenger. Another 12 percent of crashes occurred because a teenager was either talking, texting or searching for information on a cellphone while driving. The NHTSA determined that distracted driving accounts for 25 percent of all crashes involving teenage drivers.

In the US, over 50% of teenagers talk on the phone while driving, and over 30% text while driving.

== Hazard assessment ==
A 2013 study published in The New England Journal of Medicine estimated the following multiples of crash or near-crash risks among novice drivers:

Activity	Odds ratio
Calling on a phone	8.3
Reaching for a phone	7.1
Sending or receiving text messages	3.9
Reaching for an object other than a phone	8.0
Looking at a roadside object (rubbernecking)	3.9
Eating	3.0
Interaction with radio (or head unit)	1.0

Cell phone crash events according to Dingus et al. (2016)
Activity	Odds ratio	Prevalence
Total cell (handheld)	3.6	6.4%
Cell dial (handheld)	12.2	0.1%
Cell text (handheld)	6.1	1.9%
Cell reach	4.8	0.6%
Cell browse	2.7	0.7%
Cell talk	2.2	3.2%

A 2003 study of U.S. crash data estimates that distracted driving contributed to 8-13 percent of police-reported crashes, with phone use sourcing 1.5 to 5 percent of these. Driver inattention contributed to an estimated 20–50 percent of crashes. The most-reported cause of distraction-related accidents was "outside person, object, or event" (commonly known as rubbernecking), followed by "adjusting radio/cassette player/CD". "Using a phone" was the eighth most reported cause. In 2011, according to the NHTSA, one-third of accidents were caused by distracted driving.

The National Safety Council (NSC) estimates that 1.6 million (25%) of crashes annually are due to calling on a smartphone, and another 1 million (18%) are caused by texting while driving. These numbers equate to one accident caused every 24 seconds by driving distracted from phone use. It also reported that speaking in a call while driving reduces focus on the road and the act of driving by 37 percent, irrespective of hands-free calling operation. Calling on a phone is estimated to increase the risk of experienced drivers crashing or nearly crashing by a factor of 2.5. The US Department of Transportation estimates that reaching for a phone distracts a driver for 4.6 seconds; at 55 miles per hour, this could equal a football field of distance.

A study by the American Automobile Association (AAA) found that talking to a passenger was as distracting as talking in a call on a hands-free smartphone, and a study by Monash University found that having one or more children in the car was 12 times more distracting than calling while driving. Devid Petrie of the Huffington Post deemed backseat children passengers the worst distraction for drivers, and recommended pulling over in case of crying children. According to an AAA study, 80 percent of respondents with dogs drove with them, but 31 percent of these admitted to being distracted by them, and only 17 percent used any form of pet restraints.

Boston Globe correspondent Lucia Huntington stated that "eating while operating a vehicle has become the norm, but...proves costly for many drivers. Soups, unwieldy burgers, and hot drinks can make steering a car impossible. Although the dangers... are apparent and well known, drivers ignore them repeatedly, accounting for many crashes and near-misses."

== Risk characterization ==
The rising annual rate of fatalities from distracted driving corresponds to both the number of cell phone subscriptions per capita, as well as the average number of text messages sent per month. From 2009 to 2011, the number of text messages sent increased by nearly 50 percent.

Distracted driving offenders are more likely to report driving while drowsy, going 20 miles per hour over the speed limit, driving aggressively, not stopping at a red light or stop sign, and driving while under the influence of alcohol.

The American Automobile Association (AAA) reports that younger drivers are overwhelmingly more likely than older drivers to text message and talk on cell phones while driving. However, the proportion of drivers aged 35–44 who reported talking on cell phones while driving is not significantly lower than those drivers aged 18–24 who report doing so. More than 600 parents and caregivers were surveyed in two Michigan emergency rooms while their children, ages 1–12 years, were being treated for any reason. During this survey, almost 90% of drivers reported engaging in at least one technology-related distraction while driving their children in the past month. The parents who disclosed conducting phone calls while driving were 2.6 times likely to have reportedly been involved in a motor vehicle crash.

== Demographic vulnerabilities ==
In 2016, Qin et al's research indicates that the source of distraction varies significantly by age and sex:

- Young Drivers (14–24): This demographic is more likely to be distracted by in-vehicle technology (IVTD). Within this group, young female drivers showed a higher probability of engagement in technology-related distractions compared to young males.
- Older Drivers (80+): Drivers over 80 were found to be most susceptible to inner cognitive interferences.
- Sex Differences: Statistical analysis suggests that male drivers have a higher likelihood of being distracted by on-road events (external), inner cognitive factors, and unknown sources compared to in-vehicle technology.

== Seasonal and other trends ==
Distraction-affected fatal crashes exhibit seasonal patterns, with occurrences typically peaking during summer months and reaching their lowest frequency during winter months.

In August 2026 a study in the journal Jama Network Open, by Dr Vishal Patel at the Harvard Medical School and colleagues, reported that U.S. traffic fatalities increased by 15% on the days when top music albums were released, when compared with similar days. The study considered 10 major albums, launched between 2017 and 2022 including Drake's Scorpion (29 June 2018), Harry Styles' Harry's House (20 May 2022) and Taylor Swift's Midnights (21 October 2022).

== Accident risk assessment ==
In 2011, Shutko and Tijerina reviewed a large naturalistic study of in field operational tests on cars, heavy product vehicles, and commercial vehicles and buses and concluded that:

- Most of the collisions and near misses that occur involve inattention as a contributing factor.
- Visual inattention (looking away from the road ahead) is the single most significant factor contributing to crash and near-crash involvement.
- Cognitive distraction associated with listening to, or talking on, a handheld or hands-free device is associated with crashes and near-miss events to a lesser extent than is commonly believed, and such distractions may even enhance safety in some instances.

== Effects on the brain ==
=== Brain activity without distractions ===
The somatosensory association, parietal and visual cortices are not significantly activated during simple driving tasks, like driving straight or making a right-hand turn. A left turn with no oncoming traffic presents a little more activation in the premotor cortex, somatosensory area, visual and parietal cortices, as well as the cerebellum. When oncoming traffic is introduced while trying to make a left-hand turn, there is a significant activation multiple bilateral regions in the mid-posterior brain, which includes motor and premotor areas, visual, parietal, and somatosensory regions, and the cerebellum.

=== Brain activity with distractions ===
When something as simple as answering general knowledge true-or-false questions are introduced as a distraction to the driver, the brain activity is increased during both straight driving and when turning left with the presence of oncoming traffic. However, when more complex secondary tasks are introduced, such as looking at a phone or answering complex questions, both of which demand sufficient attentional resources, a significant increase in brain activity is observed in the frontal cortex. Similarly, when just driving straight, which showed very little brain activation without distraction, is paired with answering simple questions, there is a significant increase in brain activity in the ventrolateral prefrontal cortex bilaterally, along with the auditory cortex and parietal lobes. There was also decreased activation in occipital-visual regions of the brain. When a left turn plus traffic, which already yielded the most activation of the undistracted driving tasks, had audio tasks added to the tasking, auditory, motor, somatosensory, visual, parietal, and cerebellar regions were activated. There was also significant additional activation bilaterally in the anterior brain areas, mainly in the dorsolateral prefrontal cortex and frontal polar region.

=== Driving ability ===
The areas of the brain that have decreased activation during a moment of multitasking are areas of spatial processing and spatial attention. Because of this, it is important for drivers to focus on only the task at hand, driving. Even though driving becomes a primary cognitive function, when drivers are distracted (e.g. on their cell phones, talking to passengers, or fiddling with the radio), the areas of the brain that need to be activated to safely operate the vehicle are not.

== Consequences ==
The rate of incidents associated with distracted driving is growing in the United States. According to an NHTSA report, 3,477 people were killed and 391,000 were injured in the United States from motor vehicle crashes involving distracted drivers in 2015. The report states that 80% of accidents and 16% of highway deaths are the results of distracted drivers.

Incidents related to distracting driving have been particularly common among young drivers. In 2008, there were 23,059 accidents involving 16- to 19-year-olds, which led to 194 deaths. Of these deaths, 10 percent were reported to be caused by distracted driving. Throughout the United States, over 3,000 deaths and 416,000 injuries annually can be attributed to distracted driving. Driving while texting is about 4 times more likely to result in an accident than drinking while driving, while the risk of injury requiring hospital visitation is 3–5 times greater than for other types of accidents.

Some distracted driving accidents include:

- In 2013, numerous people were also killed in the Santiago de Compostela derailment where the driver had been using the telephone.
- In 2017, Thames Valley Police in England issued a video of a truck driver who killed a family by driving while using his mobile phone.
- In 2018, an Apple developer crashed his vehicle on a Mountain View highway while interacting with a video game on the mobile phone of his employer.

Distraction by mobile phone is not only found in motor vehicle accidents.

- In 2008, the engineer of a Metrolink commuter train ran a red signal while texting on his phone, colliding head-on with a freight train in Chatsworth, California, killing 25 and injuring 135.
- In 2021, the Merseyrail driver of a Class 507 EMU came into Kirkby station too fast, colliding with the buffer stop at 28 mph. He had been using his mobile phone, and pleaded guilty to endangering the passengers.

== Solutions ==
=== Legislation ===
Thirty-nine states and the District of Columbia (D.C.) have passed laws related to distracted driving. Additionally, 41 states, D.C. and Guam have banned text messaging for all drivers, and 10 states, D.C. and Guam prohibit drivers from holding phones while driving. Michigan's Kelsey's Law prohibits many teen drivers from using cell phones while driving, with a few limited exceptions. However, no state currently completely bans all use of the device, including hands-free. Each state varies in the restrictions placed upon drivers.

Current US laws are not strictly enforced. Punishments are so mild that people pay little attention. Drivers are not categorically prohibited from using phones while driving. For example, using earphones to talk and texting with a hands-free device remain legal.

Laws have not led to consistent driver compliance. Hand-held phone usage fell in New York in the five months after the hands-free law took effect. However, it returned to near the prior level by the 16-month mark.

Qin et al noted limitations in the underlying police crash reports used to construct FARS, including variation in how distraction is coded across jurisdictions and the likelihood of under‑reporting, especially when distraction must be inferred from narrative descriptions or when drivers may be reluctant to disclose distracting activities. They concluded that inner cognitive distraction appears to be a particularly important contributor to fatal crashes, and that distraction patterns differ systematically by age and sex, implying a need for targeted safety campaigns, enforcement and design countermeasures addressing both cognitive and technology‑related sources of distraction.

=== Education and communication ===
Another approach is through education. The U.S. Department of Transportation (DOT) and NHTSA conducted a series of initiatives and campaigns, such as "One Text or Call Could Wreck It all", "Stop the Texts, Stop the Wrecks" advertisement, and "Faces of Distracted Driving". The "Stop the Texts, Stop the Wrecks" commercials advocate safe driving habits via vivid scenarios, attempting to make the consequences of distraction more tangible. The "Faces of Distracted Driving" is a DOT online video series that focuses on individuals who have been personally affected.

In the August 2013 issue of Motor Age magazine, the NHTSA released voluntary guidelines covering the use of in-car infotainment and communication devices. "Proposed items include disabling manual text entry and video-based systems prohibiting the display of text messages, social media or webpages while the car is in motion or in gear. The goal: Don't take the driver's eyes off the road for more than two seconds at a time, or 12 seconds in total by limiting drivers to six inputs or touches to the screen in 12 seconds".

The cellular network providers AT&T, Verizon, Sprint, T-Mobile and several hundred other organizations have teamed up to create the "It Can Wait" campaign, that started on May 20, 2013 (Wireless Leaders Unite for "It Can Wait" Campaign to Curb Texting While Driving, 2013). The campaign is an attempt to inform young drivers that no phone call or text message is worth a life.

Washington State has also created a video PSA to educate people about the dangers of distracting driving.

An accident analysis and prevention study found that the driver having quality and healthy relationships with passengers results in better driving. While passengers have been found to pose a dangerous distraction to drivers, the quality of their relationships can make for a different outcome. Teens who drove with friends they had a good quality relationship with were found to drive safer and less distracted. This is because quality friends did not negatively influence or persuade the driver but supported them.

A similar study focused on parental relationships also found quality relationships make for better driving. Involved parents who monitored their teens driving were found to have teens that were less likely to engage in risky driving behaviors. The same study also concluded a teenager who shared a vehicle with a family member was less likely to drive unsafely or while distracted compared to a teenager who solely owned a vehicle.

=== Employer's role ===
Some employers have taken steps to reduce distracted driving beyond current legislation; The military permits only hands-free use of phones. Freight companies ban phone use while driving. In October 2009, President Obama signed an executive order banning federal employees from sending texts in government cars.

However, distracted driving is still endemic amongst commercial drivers. Personal injury attorneys have documented a wide array of circumstances where long-haul commercial drivers' phone use has led to accidents. In several egregious cases, drivers were streaming adult content when they caused catastrophic accidents. In the context of fleet management, distracted driving is a major safety and liability concern, which has led to the adoption of monitoring technologies.

In 2020, the NTSB clarified that

Strong company policy, with strict consequences for using portable electronic devices while driving, is an effective strategy in helping to prevent the deadly consequences of distracted driving.

=== Legislation progression ===
U.S. Transportation Secretary Ray LaHood introduced his "Blueprint for Ending Distracted Driving", a plan for reducing distracted driving accidents and related deaths. This blueprint encourages the eleven states without distracted driving laws to enact such legislation. It challenges the auto industry to adopt guidelines to reduce the potential for distraction. It recommended that states partner with driving educators on new curriculum materials.

=== Technology ===
Automakers and technology companies are developing solutions to mitigate driver distraction. These include dashboard and heads-up displays that allow driving information to be available without the driver looking away from the road. Gesture- and voice-based interfaces simplify controlling the vehicle and its services. Mobile applications may disable communication, blank the screen or limit access to applications or programs when the device is in motion. A similar approach is under investigation by telecom providers.

In fleet management, telematics systems are widely used to monitor and address distracted driving. A fleet telematics system can detect risky behaviors such as harsh braking, rapid acceleration, and speeding, which are often indicators of distraction. More advanced systems use video telematics, which combines a dashcam with AI to identify specific distractions like mobile phone use or drowsiness in real-time. This allows fleet managers to implement coaching programs based on objective data, often using driver scoring to benchmark performance and encourage safer habits.

On January 7, 2014, an article in CNNMoney announced a partnership between AT&T and car manufacturers Audi and Tesla. AT&T head of emerging devices, Glenn Lurie, told CNNMoney that these advancements reflect a major step forward in converting cars from mindless machines to intelligent gadgets. AT&T says everything is going to be connected. The car will be easier to use, safer, reduce distracted driving, and deliver infotainment. When asked, "Will these innovations increase distracted driving?", Mr. Laurie replied, "Visual distractions will be limited to passengers as drivers can keep their hands on the wheel". One will need only their voice to send messages and communicate with their car.

Toyota is working on perfecting technology that will monitor driver's eyelids to ensure that they are looking at the road. Other vehicle manufacturers are also working on similar technology. For example, General Motors has a pilot program to monitor distraction. Likewise, Jaguar Land Rover monitors the driver's eyes to create the 3D image for its "Virtual Windscreen".

Cellebrite has reportedly developed a textalyzer device that can be used to scan a vehicle driver's smartphone after an accident or incident to determine whether the phone was used to make calls, send text messages and/or emails when the vehicle was in motion.

Transport for New South Wales launched a mobile phone detection camera program in collaboration with technology start-up Acusensus to detect drivers using their mobile phones while driving. In the first three months of going live, 9,000,000 vehicles were checked and more than 30,000 warning letters were issued.

=== Road implementations ===
Studies have shown rumble road strips have been effective in reducing crashes due to distracted driving. A rumble strip is a section of grooved pavement. When driven on, a rumble strip makes the vehicle shake and creates tire noise. It is intended to redirect the driver's attention back on the road. Rumble strips are currently the most effective method to reducing crashes caused by distracted drivers. On rural lanes rumble strips were proven to reduce crash injury by 38% to 50%, while on urban roads they were proven to reduce it by 50% to 90%. In the United States, rumble strips exist in almost all states. However, it is up to each individual state's government as to where they decide to place these rumble strips within their state.

== In Europe ==
Based on old studies, distraction is involved in 5 to 25% of crashes in Europe for their extreme forms. Those estimates are considered under-representation. It is difficult to have accurate estimation because it is difficult to code distraction as a contributory factor after a collision.

In Europe driving during mobile phone usage is considered at risk. It is performed by younger drivers who believe they can manage it but less frequently by women.

Proposed mitigations target road user, road infrastructure and vehicles. Mitigations for road users include enforcement, campaigns, education, training programmes and companies policies. Mitigations provided by road infrastructure include avoiding roadside placement of highly distracting boards such as luminous digital boards, or implementation of longitudinal rumble strips. Mitigations provided by vehicle include warning and intervening advanced driver-assistance system (ADAS). Warning ADAS include lane departure warning and "forward collision warning". Intervening ADAS include "lane keeping assist", advanced/autonomous emergency braking.

Those ADAS may help in preventing running off the road or driving into a vehicle in front. An US analysis suggest that forward collision warning may reduces by 20% the number of front-to-rear crashes with injuries, by comparing the same type of vehicles with and without that ADAS.

ADAS may also have possible drawbacks if they can distract the driver with continuous information or increased workload.

== See also ==
- Automotive navigation system
- Behavioral modernity
- Evolutionary mismatch
- Mobile phones and driving safety
