= GSM Nation =

GSM Nation, LLC
- Company type: Private
- Website type: E-commerce
- Founded: New Haven, Connecticut, U.S. (2010)
- Headquarters: Washington, D.C., U.S.
- Founders: Ahmed Khattak; Junaid Shams
- Industry: Telecommunications
- Revenue: $100 million (2010–2013)
- Employees: 11–50 (Dec 2013)
- Website: gsmnation.com
- Current status: Defunct

GSM Nation was an on-line phone retailer and wholesaler based in the United States. It was founded in 2010 by Ahmed Khattak and Junaid Shams with support from the Yale Entrepreneurial Institute. It specializes in selling GSM unlocked phones.

In 2011, the company was named one of the top 25 most promising companies of 2011 by Bloomberg Businessweek. In 2012, Empact100 named GSM Nation within their top 100 companies of 2012, and was recognized with the ‘Most Disruptive Company’ award during its ceremony at The White House. Recently, GSM Nation has been recognized in Entrepreneur and Forbes magazine.

Ahmed Khattak founded a second mobile phone company in 2014 called US Mobile which is focusing on providing affordable cell phone plans.
