= Restrictions on cell phone use while driving in the United States =

U.S. laws regulating use of electronic mobile devices by motorists

Restrictions on cell phone use while driving—by state Hands-free cell phone use only Texting while driving prohibited for all drivers No restrictions on cell phone use while driving

Various laws in the United States regulate the use of mobile phones and other electronics by motorists. Different states take different approaches. Some laws affect only novice drivers or commercial drivers, while some laws affect all drivers. Some laws target handheld devices only, while other laws affect both handheld and handsfree devices.

== Regulatory laws ==
The laws regulating driving (or "distracted driving") may be subject to primary enforcement or secondary enforcement by state, county or local authorities. All state-level cell phone use laws in the United States are of the "primary enforcement" type — meaning an officer may cite a driver for using a hand-held cell phone without any other traffic offense having taken place — except in some cases involving newer (or "novice"), drivers. In the case of secondary enforcement, a police officer may only stop or cite a driver for a cell phone use violation if the driver has committed another primary violation (such as speeding or failure to stop) at the same time.

A federal transportation funding law passed in July 2012, known as the Moving Ahead for Progress in the 21st Century Act (MAP-21), provided $17.5 million in grants during fiscal year 2013 for states with primary enforcement laws against distracted driving, including laws prohibiting cell phone use while driving. States with secondary enforcement laws or no laws at all are ineligible to receive this grant funding.

== Laws by state ==
No state bans all cell phone use for all drivers. However, Arizona, California, Colorado, Connecticut, Delaware, Georgia, Hawaii, Idaho, Illinois, Indiana, Iowa, Louisiana, Maine, Maryland, Massachusetts, Michigan, Minnesota, Missouri, Nevada, New Hampshire, New Jersey, New York, Oregon, Pennsylvania, Rhode Island, South Carolina, Tennessee, Vermont, Virginia, Washington, West Virginia (plus Washington, D.C., Puerto Rico, Guam and the U.S. Virgin Islands) prohibit all drivers from using the hand to hold a cell phone while driving. Thirty-six states and Washington, D.C. ban all cell phone use by newer drivers, while 19 states and Washington, D.C., prohibit any cell phone use by school bus drivers if children are present. Ohio only bans hand-held use beyond its "one-swipe rule.

Cell phone restrictions while driving in the US and territories
State	Total handheld device ban applied to:	Any cell phone use by driver prohibited if:	Bus driver use restriction(s)	Texting & internet access	Comment
Alabama	16 and under, and 17 w/ temporary license or if licensed under six months (primary violation)			texting prohibited (primary)	
Alaska			totally prohibited		No restrictions on cell phone use
Arizona	All (primary violation)		texting prohibited		Emergency and law enforcement personnel, licensed radio operators, and operators using two-way or private land mobile radios for work-related duties are exempt from this rule. Also, using a device to report illegal activities or emergencies, or devices affixed to the vehicle for work purposes, is allowed.
Arkansas	18–20 years old (primary violation)	under 18 (secondary violation)	totally prohibited	texting prohibited (primary)	Any cell phone use prohibited in school or construction zones (secondary violation).
California	All (primary violation)	under 18 (secondary violation)	totally prohibited (primary)	texting prohibited	
Colorado		on learner's permit or under 18 (primary violation)		totally prohibited (primary)	
Connecticut	All (primary violation)	under 18 (primary violation)	totally prohibited		
Delaware	All (primary violation)	on learner or intermediate license (primary violation)	totally prohibited		
Florida	School zones and active construction zones(primary)			Allowed only while stopped at a red light. Otherwise prohibited. (Primary)	Hands free earpieces can only be used in one ear.
Georgia	All drivers (primary violation)	under 18 (primary violation)	driver totally prohibited unless used for routing communication	driver totally prohibited, includes video	driver allowed to use hands free devices (specific ones) and voice to text with hands free devices and allowed to use permanently-mounted GPS; drivers are allowed to make emergency calls and report hazardous road conditions. Commercial vehicle drivers have limited use directly related to their work (GPS or routing communication) effective date 1 July 2018.
Guam	All (primary violation)				
Hawaii	All (primary violation)	under 18 (primary violation)	totally prohibited		Statewide law entered into force July 2013; all counties had existing bans on cell phone use. Drivers 18 and older may use hands-free devices.
Idaho	All (primary violation)				
Illinois	All (primary violation)	any driver under 19 (primary violation)	totally prohibited		Any cell phone use prohibited in school or construction zones or within 500 feet of an emergency scene (primary violation).
Indiana	All (primary violation)				A driver may not hold or handle their cell phone at any time while driving. Handsfree calls are permitted. Phone or other device may be used for navigation. However, handling phone to initiate call or navigation must be done before entering roadway. No touching/handling cell phone while driving/on-roadway is permitted, including while stopped at traffic signals.
Iowa		on restricted or intermediate license (primary violation)		totally prohibited (primary)	July 1, 2017 updated the texting law to be enforced as a primary reason an officer can stop a driver. "Texting" is defined as: texting, internet browsing, playing games, and reading social media applications. If proven a driver was "texting" during a traffic fatality, it is deemed a Class C felony, and the driver can be put into prison for up to 10 years.
Kansas		on learner or intermediate license (primary violation)			
Kentucky		under 18 (primary violation)	totally prohibited		
Louisiana	Prohibited in school zones	on learner or intermediate license (primary violation)		totally prohibited	Effective since June 13, 2016.
Maine	All (primary violation)	Under age of 18 or with a learner's permit or licensed for 270 days or less			except for GPS or navigation uses
Maryland	All (primary violation)	under 18 w/ restricted learner or intermediate license			
Massachusetts	All (primary violation) as of February 2020			totally prohibited	Until February 2020, handheld cell phone use was allowed as long as one hand was on the wheel at all times. Since February 2020, law allows one tap to activate voice communication, and use of navigational touch screens are allowed if mounted on windshield or dashboard.
Michigan	All (primary violation) as of January 2022			totally prohibited	
Minnesota	All (primary violation) as of 08/01/2019	under 18 w/ learner or provisional license (primary violation)	totally prohibited		
Mississippi			totally prohibited		
Missouri	All				Effective August 28, 2023, cell phone use while driving is prohibited to all ages. Starting January 1, 2025, law enforcement began issuing citations. Penalty schedule: 1. 1st offense - $150 fine.; 2. 2nd offense within 24 months - $250 fine.; 3. 3rd offense within 24 months - $500 fine.
Montana					
Nebraska		under 18 w/ learner or intermediate license (secondary violation)			
Nevada	All (primary violation)				
New Hampshire	All (primary violation)		totally prohibited		Penalty Schedule: 1. 1st Offense - $100 Fine; 2. 2nd Offense - $250 Fine.; 3. 3rd Offense - $500 Fine, and a 2-year suspension of drivers license.
New Jersey	All (primary violation)	on permit or provisional license (primary violation).	totally prohibited		see Kyleigh's Law
New Mexico	Local Option by Jurisdiction	on learner or provisional license (primary violation)			
New York	All (primary violation)				
North Carolina		Under 18 (primary violation)	totally prohibited		texting prohibited (Primary) Internet access okay
North Dakota		Under 18 (primary violation)			
Ohio		All use beyond "one swipe" rules (since April 4, 2023) (primary violation)			
Oklahoma	Learner or intermediate license holder (primary violation)		totally prohibited	Texting/E-mail prohibited (primary)	See "Trooper Nicholas Dees and Trooper Keith Burch Act of 2015" (HB 1965)
Oregon	All (primary violation)	under 18 (primary violation)			
Pennsylvania	All (primary violation)	All (primary violation)	totally prohibited	Totally prohibited (as of June 5, 2025)	
Puerto Rico	All (primary violation)			Texting prohibited	
Rhode Island	All (primary violation) 06/01/2018	under 18 (primary violation)	totally prohibited	Texting prohibited	
South Carolina			Totally prohibited, but officers must ascertain that a driver is texting rather than using the phone for another purpose.	Texting prohibited	Authorities can impose fines and track "distractions" on accident reports under Contributing Factors.
South Dakota		on learner or intermediate license (secondary violation)		Texting prohibited	
Tennessee	All (primary violation)	on learner or intermediate license (primary violation)	totally prohibited	texting prohibited	
Texas	Driving through school zones	under 18 (primary violation)	totally prohibited	texting prohibited	Texting is allowed: To report a crime, fire, traffic accident, or medical emergency.; To Activate music, make calls, or use navigation apps via hands-free technology.; To interact with their devices when the vehicle is stopped
Utah		under 18 (primary violation)			Regulated under distracted driving laws.
Vermont	All (primary violation)	under 18 (primary violation)		totally prohibited (primary)	GPS use of cell phone is allowed if the cell phone is securely mounted and not in the driver's hand First offense shall be subject to a fine of $100 - $200 Second and subsequent offenses shall be subject to a fine of $250 - $500 if within a 2-year period
Virgin Islands	All (primary violation)				
Virginia	All (primary violation)	all	totally prohibited	totally prohibited	Effective January 1, 2021, all handheld use of a phone is prohibited. Exceptions allowed for when lawfully parked or stopped, emergency vehicles, reporting an emergency, using the radio, and traffic incident management workers.
Washington	All (primary violation)	on learner or intermediate license (primary violation)		Texting prohibited	
Washington, D.C.	All (primary violation)	on learner permit (primary violation)	totally prohibited	totally prohibited	
West Virginia	All (primary violation)	under 18 w/ learner or intermediate license (primary violation)			
Wisconsin	Driving through construction zones	on learner or intermediate license (primary violation)	Texting prohibited	Texting prohibited	Any activity appearing to interfere with driving prohibited
Wyoming		on learner or intermediate license (primary violation)			

== Preemption laws ==
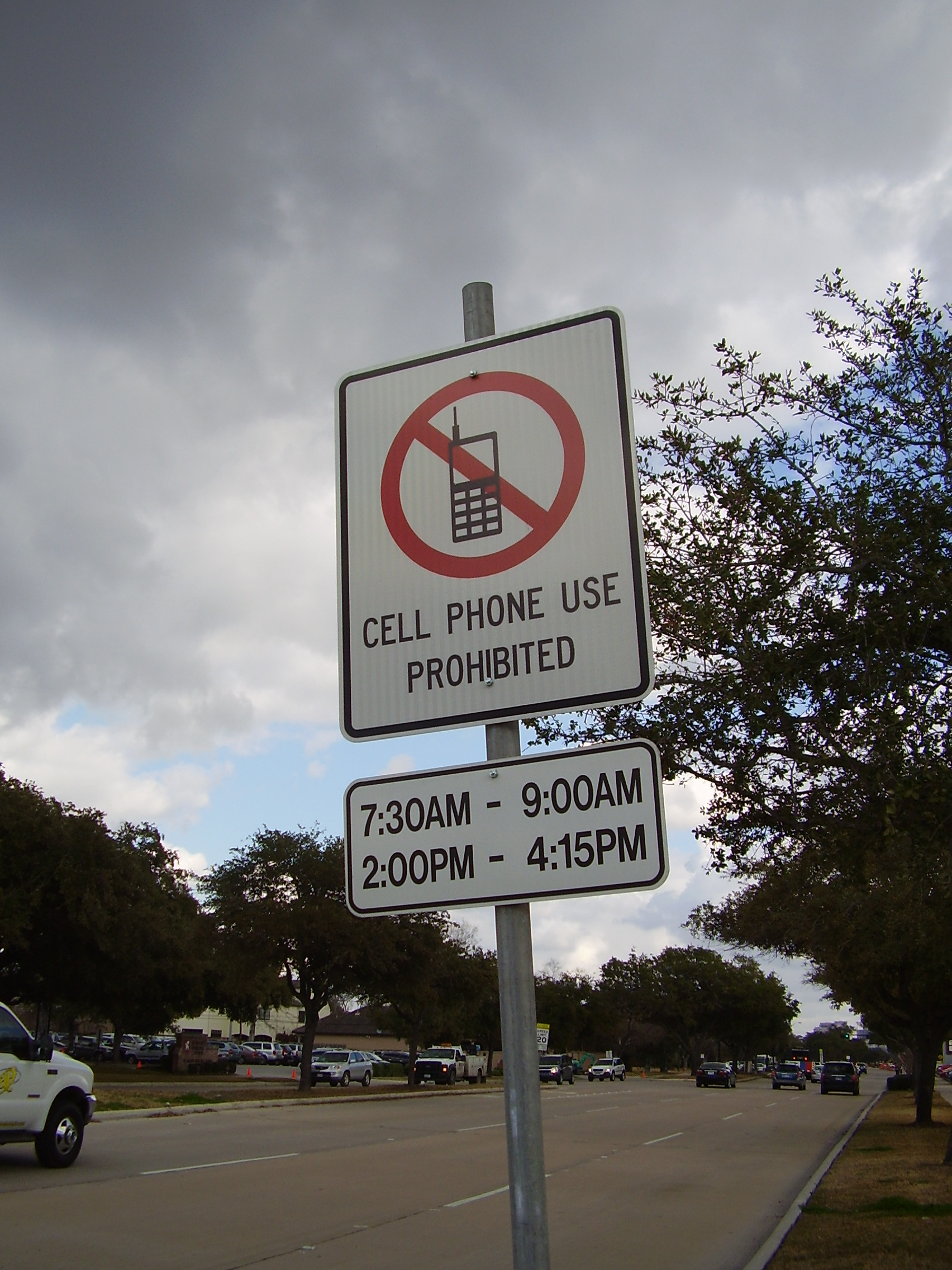
Cell phone use is regulated by local ordinance during certain hours in Southside Place, Texas, in Greater Houston.

Often, local authorities pass their own distracted driving bans—most include the use of cell phones while driving. Several states (Florida, Kentucky, Louisiana, Mississippi, Nevada, Pennsylvania, and Oklahoma) have prohibited localities from enacting their own laws regarding cell phone use.

== Cost of distracted driving ==
A 2014 report from the National Safety Council, which compiles data on injuries and fatalities from 2013 and earlier, concluded that use of mobile phones caused 26% of U.S. car accidents. Just 5% of mobile phone-related accidents in the U.S. involved texting: "The majority of the accidents involve drivers distracted while talking on handheld or hands-free cellphones."

The U.S. Department of Transportation has established an official website to combat distracted driving, Distraction.gov.

In 2010, the State Farm insurance company stated that mobile phone use annually resulted in: 636,000 crashes, 330,000 personal injuries, 12,000 major injuries, 2,700 deaths, and $43 billion in damages.

In 2018, the National Highway Traffic Safety Administration released the following data - 2,841 lives lost due to distracted driving. Among those killed: 1,730 drivers, 605 passengers, 400 pedestrians and 77 bicyclists. The report clearly states, texting is the "most alarming distraction".

== See also ==
- Texting while driving
