= Arise for Social Justice =

American low-income rights organization

Arise for Social Justice is a grassroots organization focused on furthering the rights of low-income people formed in 1985 in Springfield, Massachusetts. Founding members centered the early activism of the group around their shared identity as women on welfare.

== Founding ==
This group emerged during the presidency of Ronald Reagan, who repeatedly invoked the racialized trope of a black, single mother “welfare queen” to paint a picture of welfare recipients as lazy and undeserving of assistance from the government and to blame for their poverty. Led by low-income members, Arise's founders believed that "we as poor people have a right to speak for ourselves, and that as we do, we learn how to build political power for ourselves." The founding members of Arise, Michaelann Bewsee, Cindy Montoya, Hollee Patterson, Karen Rock, Pam Scott, and Terrill Winston, were initially brought together through the Boston-based group Coalition for Basic Human Needs. Montoya and Rock, who lived in Northampton, Massachusetts, soon formed a separate group in that city. The remaining Springfield women were later joined by Terrill's sister Marsha Burnett and Darlene Nellis among others.

Arise incorporated as a non-profit organization in 1986. It hired its first director, opened its first office, and became a delegate agency of the Springfield Action Commission, a local anti-poverty agency in 1987. A six- to ten-member Board of Directors oversaw business affairs and property. Committees provided the "strategic thinking" for the organization. The small paid staff worked primarily on financial development, training, and volunteer coordination. Grants sometimes allowed for hiring staff to work on special projects.

== Activism ==
Though the members initially conceived of the group as a welfare rights organization "because all of us were recipients," they "soon realized that all people who live below the poverty line are suffering from discrimination, violation of rights, and threats to their survival and that the working poor and recipients were being played off against each other instead of coming together for your common survival." 1 "By the time we wrote our by-laws we had become a low-income rights organization." 2 In the mid-1990s, Arise added a significant element of "anti-oppression work" to its mission.

At its founding, Arise joined the "Up to Poverty" Campaign, a statewide, grassroots effort led by welfare recipients to create a minimum welfare payment level for families and individuals who relied on Aid to Families with Dependent Children (AFDC) or General Relief (GR) for all or part of their income. The concept was to bring the amount of the grant up to the federal poverty level.

Their focus on welfare continued under Bill Clinton, who also used this characterization to support welfare reform with the substitution of TANF (Temporary Assistance to Needy Families) for AFDC (Aid to Families with Dependent Children), which required welfare recipients to work or perform community service to receive care, excluded felons, and imposed limits on aid that wasn’t necessarily guaranteed. These presidential attitudes set the stage for other reforms in the state of Massachusetts, especially by governors Michael Dukakis and Bill Weld, and created the necessity for activism for survival of low-income women.

=== Citizen advocates ===
Arise members trained as Citizen Advocates to assist individuals in navigating the legal system, health care infrastructure, and a variety of city, state, and federal offices and departments, such as Veterans Affairs, Public Welfare, Housing Authority, Social Services, and Prisons. The training emphasized knowledge of clients' rights and effective advocacy techniques. Advocates aided clients with welfare system issues, such as food stamps, Medicaid cards, and fair hearings. They also helped with housing issues, evictions and problems with landlords; and other matters, such as divorce, separation, restraining orders, and child support payments; social security; and disability. Arise-trained Citizen Advocates helped Springfield residents to write letters, fill out forms, and would accompany them on visits to various offices.

=== Low-income issues ===
Over the years the group widened the scope of their activism from fighting for progressive welfare reforms to addressing a plethora of issues that affected their lives as low-income people. They empowered their community by registering new voters and fought to install people on the City Council that represented their wards, races, and interests.

Beginning in 1992 Arise participated in a collective of non-profit organizations working to rehabilitate the Rainville Hotel at 32 Byers St. in Springfield, as a single-room occupancy (SRO) residence for single, low-income men and women. The collective consisted of Arise, Open Pantry, the Springfield Action Commission, Gandara Mental Health Center, the Housing Allowance Project, the South Middlesex Non-Profit Housing Corp., and the Community Builders. Arise later managed the building which not only provided housing, but a range of social services emphasizing self-help and mutual support. As part of this effort, Arise also established its Self-Reliance Center/Program to be a community-based economic development and homelessness support center for homeless, formerly homeless, and those at-risk of becoming homeless. The program fostered peer support, the development of organizational and leadership skills, and featured a skills exchange.

By 1993 Arise had also established a Hot Meals program for homeless families placed in motels, organized against one of Springfield's most negligent landlords, and registered more than 2,000 new voters.

=== Homelessness ===
By the late 1980s Arise was also working on homelessness. Arise members served on various city committees and in coalitions working to provide more shelter beds; shelter for different populations (families, battered women); as well as a variety of services, benefits, and facilities to help the homeless find and keep permanent housing.

Another high-profile point of activism was achieved with the sponsorship of a tent-city for the homeless community, which coincided with the organization’s larger goal to humanize the homeless and fight for affordable and fair housing and shelters, especially focused on aiding families and battered women.

Arise members served on committees working to develop a Comprehensive Housing Affordability Strategy (CHAS) for Springfield in the early 1990s. The organization constantly explored a wide variety of alternatives, such as community land trusts, limited equity cooperatives, and AIDS housing. It also worked with public housing tenants to form tenant organizations through the Massachusetts Tenants Organization (MTO) and Massachusetts Union of Public Housing Tenants, and served as resources for tenants' rights. The organization advocated for a rent control initiative in Springfield in 1988-89, and to prevent the loss of "at-risk" (or expiring use) subsidized housing.

=== Criminal justice ===
Arise's involvement with the criminal justice system began when the organization agreed to employ individuals sentenced to do community service work in 1988. The membership has worked on issues related to police brutality, community policing, citizen review of police, criminal offender record information (CORI) regulations, prison conditions, mandatory minimum sentences, political prisoners, youth violence, and the death penalty.

=== International affairs ===
Arise also provided solidarity for international issues, particularly in Central America, sending a delegation to Nicaragua in 1996. They established close ties with the New England Central America Network (NECAN) to work on labor rights, environmental degradation, anti-imperialism and militarism, anti-apartheid advocacy.

=== HIV/AIDS ===
Arise undertook HIV/AIDS education and prevention for at-risk groups like sex workers and prostitutes. They ran a controversial needle-exchange program and distributed condoms, but also worked to curb the structural conditions that led to work in and stigmatization of these fields.

By 1997 they had developed a program, written a grant, and received funding from the Massachusetts Department of Public Health's HIV/AIDS Bureau to establish and run an HIV/AIDS Education and Prevention Program. As with other Arise activities, the Program aimed to provide direct services (such as needle exchange, condom distribution, and health care information) and education aimed at prevention, while also working on larger societal issues. The Program funded establishment of a Sex Worker Outreach Team (SWOT) to promote self-protection among women engaged in, or at risk for being pushed to engage in, sex work in Springfield. SWOT aimed to "develop and share with Arise membership and the wider community a political-economic analysis of sex work and strategies for changing the social and economic conditions which push women into street sex work." The program, under the clinical supervision of Nancy Lyman-Shaver, included monthly individual sessions and group sessions.

In its second year, the group changed its name to Women in Support of Each Other (WISE) "to make ourselves more accessible sounding to women that do not identify with the title sex worker." The group distributed condoms, bleach and water kits, and educational materials. Its long-range goals included improved working conditions for club workers and decriminalization of prostitution, teaching self-advocacy skills, and providing space and resources to help break down barriers between women. Arise worked with the Springfield Harm Reduction Coalition (ShaRC), the Springfield Users Council and the Springfield Alliance for Needle Exchange (SANE) to attempt implementation of a legal needle exchange program in city of Springfield.

=== Other projects ===
Arise also facilitated support groups and workshops for parenting, empowerment, health, stress reduction, and skills building through its Self-Reliance Center (1992-), Homeless Action Center (1987-), and Myles Horton Free School (circa 1994-).

Though access to health care is one of Arise's continuing long-term interests, the group participated especially vigorously in two events in the 1990s—debates related to President Clinton's proposed health care reform plan in 1993-94, and a Massachusetts public policy ballot referendum to establish a single-payer health care system in the state in 1994.

Other campaigns sought to increase the participation of low-income citizens on city-wide boards, and in the political process, especially through a campaign to replace the all at-large seats on City Council with a system including some ward representatives. Arise worked to defeat the Citizens for Limited Taxation ballot initiative in 1990 and participated in an especially extensive effort for voter registration and mobilization in the late 1990s and early 2000s.

== Current activities ==
Arise currently supports four coalitions that focus on housing, environmental justice, criminal justice, and combating discrimination and homophobia. The housing group advocates for affordable housing and pushes policies that work towards ending homelessness and making sure that shelters and landlords are just. The environmental justice committee began to combat environmental racism in the form of the construction of a biomass waste incinerator in the neighborhood. But since then they have become a leader in educating Springfield residents about the effect of pollution on low-income communities, shifted the city largely from coal to gas, and are currently working on improving the air quality and pollution in the city. The criminal justice group works to combat police brutality, working for the transparency and accountability of policemen, as well as exploring alternatives to police forces and punitive measures through community. The group has identified and partnered with lawyers that have similar aims and reinstated the Springfield Police Commission in 2016 to monitor policemen. The coalition against homophobia and hate is currently working alongside many other activist groups on combating the hateful rhetoric and crimes against humanity of Scott Lively in the case SMUG v. Lively.

In 2010 Arise listed its key issues and campaigns as economic justice (to make sure people on public assistance get their rights), "digital divide" computer education, free school education to empower individuals, and peace with solidarity and anti-violence work to educate the community about the waging of wars abroad.
