= Joshua's Law =

Driving license law in Georgia, United States

Joshua’s Law is a Georgia state law enacted in 2007 changing the driver's license requirements for teen drivers. A teen driver must meet the new requirements to obtain a Georgia driver’s license. The law was named after Joshua Brown, who died in a crash in 2003. Joshua’s parents joined with legislators in an effort to put stronger driver training laws into effect. The end result was to strengthen the 1997 Teenage and Adult Driver Responsibility Act (TADRA), a law that requires teens get specific driving experience and instruction before obtaining licensing beyond the learner's permit. The law also implemented a graduated driver licensing system, imposing time-of-day and passenger restrictions on drivers aged 16 and 17.

== Licensing procedure ==
TADRA, enacted on July 1, 1997, necessitates a graduated three step driver licensing procedure for Georgia teens between the ages of 15 and 18. There are three separate classifications for teen driver licensing. Joshua’s Law, which went into effect January 1, 2007, added an additional educational requirement to the second step.

Step 1, the Learner's permit (Class CP license). Can operate a Class C vehicle when accompanied by a person at least 21 years of age who is licensed to drive a class C vehicle, who is fit and capable of exercising control over the vehicle, and who is occupying a seat beside the driver.

Step 2, the Intermediate license (Class D license). Drivers are 16 years of age, who have held an Instructional Permit for 12 months and 1 day and passed the state-administered comprehensive on-road driving test are eligible for this license. There are several restrictions on this license, which are:

- No driving between the hours of 12am and 5am.
- For the first six months, the only passengers allowed in the vehicle are immediate family members and spouses.
- For the second six months the driver is allowed to carry passengers who are not immediate family members, as long as no more than one of those passengers is under 21 years of age.
- After the second six months the driver is allowed up to three such passengers (persons under 21 who are not members of the driver's immediate family).
- Joshua's Law - On or after January 1, 2007, any 16 year old who obtains an initial Class D license must have completed:
  - a driver education course approved by the Department of Driver Services (course certificate required);
  - Georgia's Alcohol and Drug Awareness Program (ADAP) or Electronic Alcohol and Drug Awareness Program (E-ADAP) (course certificate and passing test score required); and
  - a cumulative total of at least forty (40) hours of other supervised driving experience, including at least six (6) hours at night (proof not required).

Step 3, the Full license (Class C license). The Class C license is granted to drivers ages 18 years and older who have a class D license and have no major traffic convictions during the previous 12 months. Drivers under the age of 18 may obtain their class C license prior to reaching the age of 18 and holding their class D license for a year and a day if they enlist in any of the United States Armed Forces. Major traffic violations are as follows:

- DUI
- Eluding a police officer
- Drag racing
- Reckless driving
- Hit and run
- Any violation that assesses four or more points on the driver's license

== Other provisions ==
Joshua's Law also implemented additional fees on certain traffic offenses such as DUIs. The program raises approximately $2 to $4 million per year in revenue for the State of Georgia.
