= Kyleigh's Law =

Graduated driver's license law in New Jersey

Kyleigh's Law (S2314) is a motor vehicle law in New Jersey that requires any driver under age 21 who holds a permit or probationary driver's license to display a $4 pair of decals on the top left corner of the front and rear license plates of their vehicles. The decals were mandatory as of May 1, 2010. This law also prohibits drivers under the age of 21 from driving between 11:01 pm and 5:00am. If pulled over, a first or second offense can subject the driver to a $25 fine, whereas a third offense earns 2 points on the driver's license, and a 4th offense puts the teen driver on probation and takes away their license for up to 6 months. This law is in effect in New Jersey as of May 2010.

The red, detachable decals are 1 by 1 1/2 inches (25 mm × 38 mm) and are to be attached to license plates. The decal is intended to identify the driver's provisional license status to the police so they may identify possible law-breakers more easily. The law is named for Kyleigh D'Alessio, a 16-year-old killed in a 2006 Washington Township, Morris County crash in which another teen was driving. The 17-year-old driver of that vehicle was violating the then-current GDL restrictions by driving with three passengers when he was limited to only one (one of the passengers was his brother who was not included in passenger restrictions). The teen driver of the vehicle, Tanner Birch, was also killed in the accident, as well as, severely injuring a third student whom was in critical condition for several days after the accident. The vehicle driven was an Audi TT and was traveling at a high rate of speed when the driver lost control of the vehicle causing it to hit the raised curb, briefly going airborne while rotating until the driver side of the vehicle struck a tree, killing Birch and D'Alessio instantly.

== Probationary license restrictions ==
An additional law (S-16) signed at the same time as Kyleigh's Law and effected simultaneously alters the restrictions already set forth in New Jersey with the GDL (Graduated Driver's License) system.

=== Previous restrictions ===
- The holder of a provisional license shall be permitted to operate the passenger automobile with only one additional passenger in the vehicle, except that this passenger restriction shall not apply when either the holder of the provisional license or one other passenger is at least 21 years of age.
- The holder of the provisional license who is under 21 years of age shall not drive during the hours between 11:01 p.m. and 5 a.m.; provided however, that this condition may be waived for an emergency which, in the judgment of local police, is of sufficient severity and magnitude to substantially endanger the health, safety, welfare or property of a person or for any bona fide employment or religion-related activity if the employer or appropriate religious authority provides written verification of such activity in a manner provided for by the chief administrator.
- The holder of the provisional license shall not use any interactive wireless communication device, except in an emergency, while operating a moving passenger automobile on a public road or highway. "Use" shall include, but not be limited to, talking or listening on any interactive wireless communication device or operating its keys, buttons or other controls.
- The holder of the provisional license shall ensure that all occupants of the vehicle are secured in a properly adjusted and fastened seat belt or child restraint system.

=== Restrictions under Kyleigh's Law ===
- The holder of a probationary license shall be permitted to operate the passenger automobile with only one additional passenger in the vehicle besides any dependent of the probationary license holder, except that this passenger restriction shall not apply when the holder of the probationary license is at least 21 years of age or the probationary license holder is accompanied by a parent or guardian.
- The holder of the probationary license who is under 21 years of age shall not drive during the hours between 11:01 p.m. and 5 a.m.; provided however, that this condition may be waived for an emergency which, in the judgment of local police, is of sufficient severity and magnitude to substantially endanger the health, safety, welfare or property of a person or for any bona fide employment or religion-related activity if the employer or appropriate religious authority provides written verification of such activity in a manner provided for by the chief administrator.
- The holder of the probationary license shall not use any hand-held or hands-free interactive wireless communication device, except in an emergency, while operating a moving passenger automobile on a public road or highway. "Use" shall include, but not be limited to, talking or listening on any hand-held or hands-free interactive wireless communication device or operating its keys, buttons or other controls.
- The holder of the probationary license shall ensure that all occupants of the vehicle are secured in a properly adjusted and fastened seat belt or child restraint system.
- Red stickers must be worn on front and back license plates of the car identifying the bearer as holding a probationary license. S2314

Failure to comply with any of these restrictions results in a $100 fine if pulled over. S-16

== Controversy ==
Some New Jersey residents think the law may actually put teen drivers in greater danger. The red color sticker on the license plates could be used by criminals, predators, and sex offenders stalking the roads for potential teenage victims. They also cite the possibility of police profiling though law enforcement denies this will occur. These arguments were included in the motion to repeal the law, but Judge Robert Brennan dismissed the motion and allowed the law to take effect.

Opponents of the law cite the unintended consequences in Florida, where a similar law for rental cars, passed in the 1990s, resulted in nine tourists attacked and murdered because the license plates identified the rental vehicles to criminals who targeted the out-of-town drivers unfamiliar with their surroundings and possibly carrying a lot of cash.

National Youth Rights Association, calling the law "discriminatory and dangerous," is encouraging all New Jersey motorists, including those not required to do so, to place the decals on their license plates.

The law has been met with widespread noncompliance across the state. As of May 11, 2010 only about 2 in 5 of those who were required to have the stickers had purchased them. On May 13, 2010, a rally was held in Morris County by teens, as well as parents and grandparents, calling for a repeal of the law. In addition, reports of stolen stickers have surfaced.

On August 6, 2012, the New Jersey Supreme Court upheld the decal requirement of Kyleigh's Law, saying that it does not violate the federal Driver's Privacy Protection Act which says that the fact that a driver is under 21 and holds a learner's permit, examination permit, or probationary license can be disclosed. The courts said "the driver's age group constitutes neither 'highly restricted personal information' within the meaning of (the federal law) nor 'personal information' within the meaning of" the federal law. "The young drivers subject to (Kyleigh's Law) have no reasonable expectation of privacy in their age group because a driver's age group can generally be determined by his or her physical appearance, which is routinely exposed to public view."

== See also ==
- L-plates – similar systems used internationally
