= Criminal Offender Record Information =

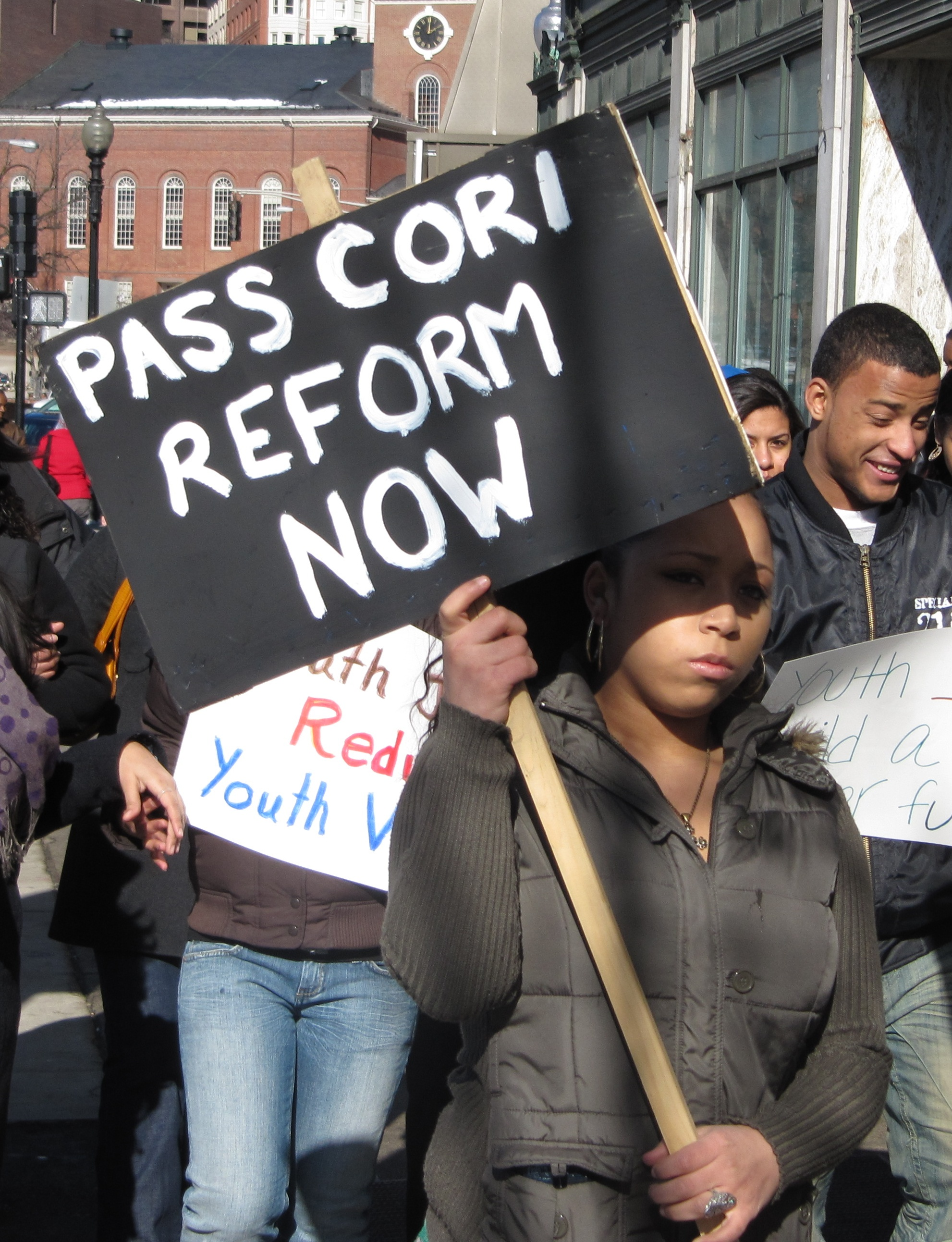
2010 protestor in Downtown Boston objecting to CORI policies as an impediment to jobs for youth

Criminal Offender Record Information (CORI) is a record of all criminal court appearances in Massachusetts for a particular individual, including arrests, convictions, dismissals, and serious violations. Nearly 1.5 million CORI reports are issued each year. On August 6, 2010, Governor Deval Patrick signed into law reforms to the state's criminal offender records information system (CORI), aiming to “to improve employment opportunities”.

== Reform controversy ==
CORI has been controversial because information that a person has committed or been accused of committing a crime makes it difficult to obtain housing, employment, loans, insurance, entrance to college, or become a guardian or foster parent. The Massachusetts Alliance to Reform CORI, Boston Workers' Alliance, EPOCA and Neighbor to Neighbor, amongst other groups advocate for various changes, including quicker sealing of older records. Reform advocates call the reports flawed and difficult to interpret. CORIs display all court arraignments—regardless of the eventual outcome of the case—and advocates say this in effect turns all criminal histories into "life sentences". They also point out that the social and economic impact of CORI affects the children of former offenders.

After a reform in the early 2010s, one must wait 10 years for a felony and five years for a misdemeanor after final disposition (the date probation is finished) to apply to the Office of the Commissioner of Probation and have this record sealed. However individuals must wait an additional 15/10 years if they receive even a minor citation, such as a traffic ticket for more than $50. As of 2010, a reform bill is in the state legislature, which would reduce these wait times. The reform also allows judges to seal dismissed cases after probation period.

== Bibliography ==
- Commonwealth of Massachusetts, "A Guide to Public Access, Sealing & Expungement of District Court Records", prepared by the Administrative Office of the District Court, May 1, 2007
- Commonwealth of Massachusetts, "Regarding the Use and Dissemination of Criminal Offender Record Information (CORI) by the Executive Department.", Executive Order No. 495, Jan 2008.
- House Bill No. 1416 (The Public Safety Act of 2007), "AN ACT IMPROVING PUBLIC SAFETY IN THE COMMONWEALTH", 2007.
- Kaplan, Claire, et al., "CORI: Opening Doors of Opportunity", The Boston Foundation, 2007.
- Kaplan, Claire, et al., "CORI: Balancing Individual Rights and Public Access: Challenges of the Criminal Offender Record Information System and Opportunities for Reform", The Boston Foundation, 2005
- Winsor, Ernest, "The CORI Reader", July 2006, Massachusetts Law Reform Institute.
