= Drainage =

Removal of water from an area of land

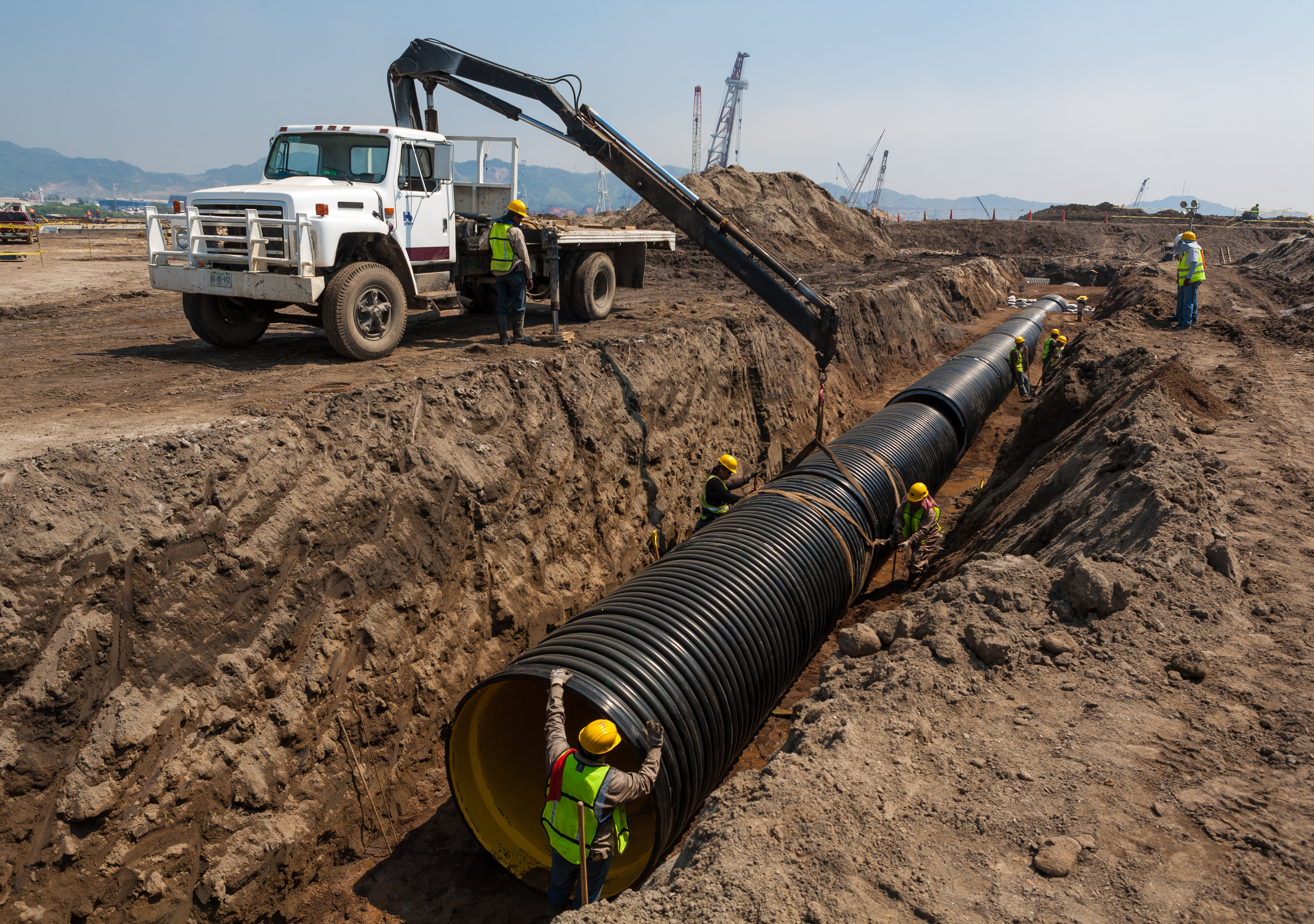
High-density polyethylene pipe installation in a storm drain project, Mexico.

Drainage is the natural or artificial removal of a surface's water and sub-surface water from an area with excess water. The internal drainage of most agricultural soils can prevent severe waterlogging (anaerobic conditions that harm root growth), but many soils need artificial drainage to improve production or to manage water supplies.

== History ==
=== Early history ===
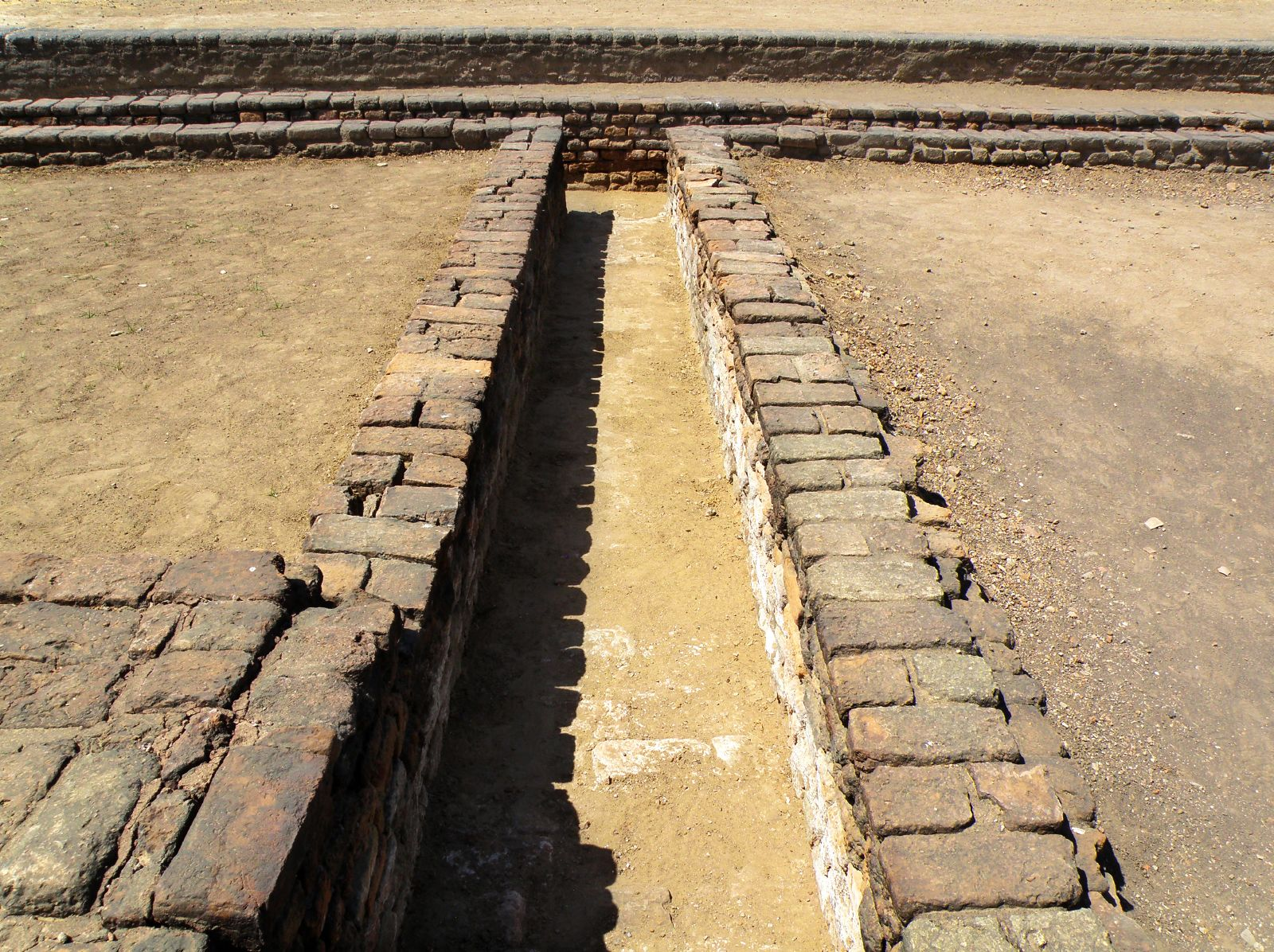
Remains of a drain at Lothal circa 3000 BC

The Indus Valley Civilization had sewerage and drainage systems. All houses in the major cities of Harappa and Mohenjo-daro had access to water and drainage facilities. Waste water was directed to covered gravity sewers, which lined the major streets.

=== 18th and 19th century ===
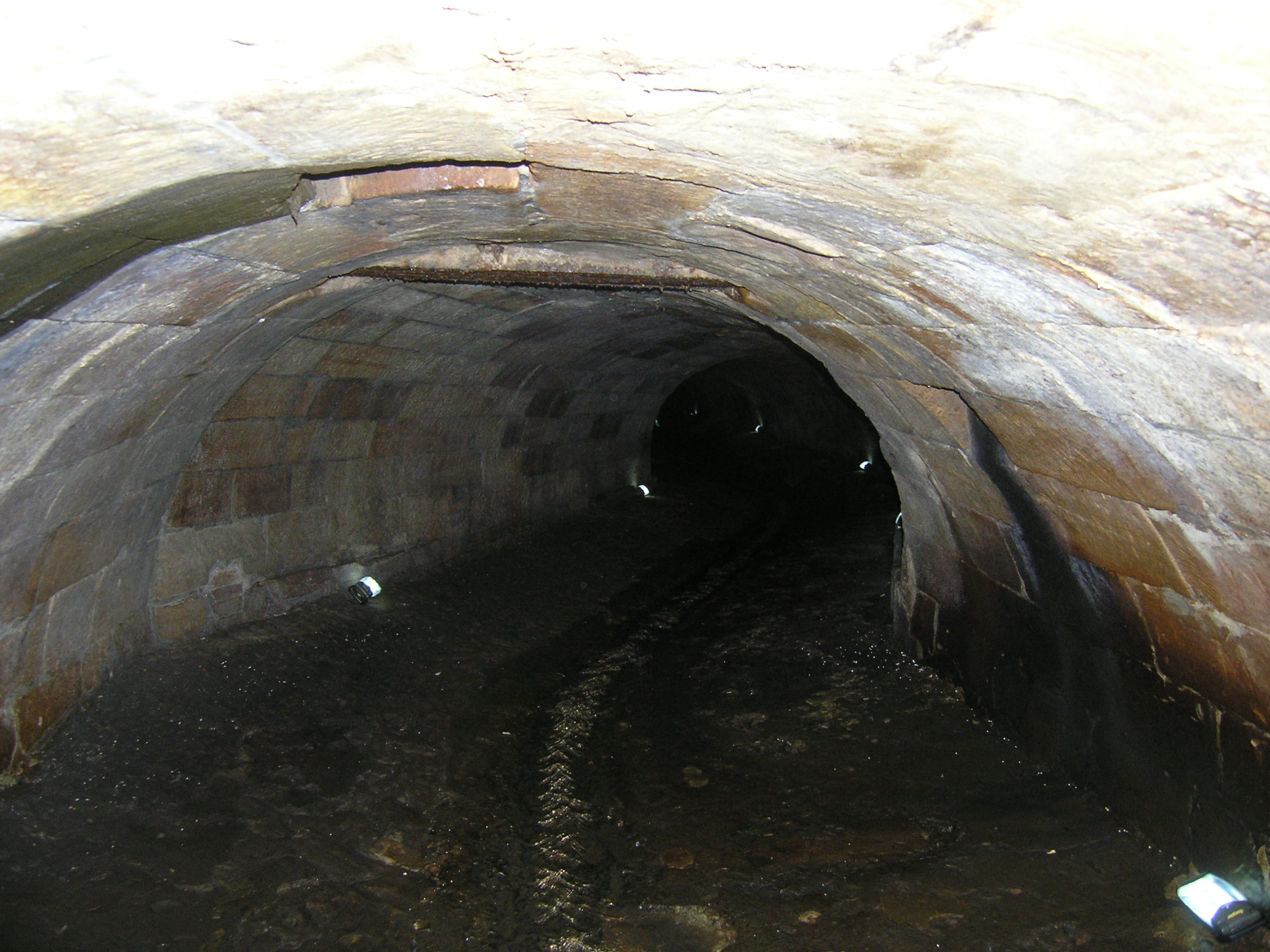
Tank Stream, a historical drain in the City of Sydney, Australia

The invention of hollow-pipe drainage is credited to Sir Hugh Dalrymple, who died in 1753.

== Current practices ==
Simple infrastructure such as open drains, pipes, and berms are still common. In modern times, more complex structures involving substantial earthworks and new technologies have been common as well.

=== Geotextiles ===
New storm water drainage systems incorporate geotextile filters that retain and prevent fine grains of soil from passing into and clogging the drain. Geotextiles are synthetic textile fabrics specially manufactured for civil and environmental engineering applications. Geotextiles are designed to retain fine soil particles while allowing water to pass through. In a typical drainage system, they would be laid along a trench which would then be filled with coarse granular material: gravel, sea shells, stone or rock. The geotextile is then folded over the top of the stone and the trench is then covered by soil. Groundwater seeps through the geotextile and flows through the stone to an outfell. In high groundwater conditions a perforated plastic (PVC or PE) pipe is laid along the base of the drain to increase the volume of water transported in the drain.

Alternatively, a prefabricated plastic drainage system made of HDPE, often incorporating geotextile, coco fiber or rag filters can be considered. The use of these materials has become increasingly more common due to their ease of use, since they eliminate the need for transporting and laying stone drainage aggregate, which is invariably more expensive than a synthetic drain and concrete liners.

=== 21st century alternatives ===
Seattle's Public Utilities created a pilot program called Street Edge Alternatives Project. The project focuses on designing a system "to provide drainage that more closely mimics the natural landscape prior to development than traditional piped systems". The streets are characterized by ditches along the side of the roadway, with plantings designed throughout the area. An emphasis on non-curbed sidewalks allows water to flow more freely into the areas of permeable surface on the side of the streets. Because of the plantings, the run off water from the urban area does not all directly go into the ground, but can also be absorbed into the surrounding environment. Monitoring conducted by Seattle Public Utilities reports a 99 percent reduction of storm water leaving the drainage project.

Sustainable urban drainage systems (SUDS) are designed to encourage contractors to install drainage system that more closely mimic the natural flow of water in nature. Since 2010 local and neighbourhood planning in the UK is required by law to factor SUDS into any development projects that they are responsible for.

Slot drainage is a channel drainage system designed to eliminate the need for further pipework systems to be installed in parallel to the drainage, reducing the environmental impact of production as well as improving water collection. Stainless steel, concrete channel, PVC and HDPE are all materials available for slot drainage which have become industry standards on construction projects.

=== In the construction industry ===
The civil engineer is responsible for drainage in construction projects. During the construction process, they set out all the necessary levels for roads, street gutters, drainage, culverts and sewers involved in construction operations.

Civil engineers and construction managers work alongside architects and supervisors, planners, quantity surveyors, and the general workforce, as well as subcontractors. Typically, most jurisdictions have some body of drainage law to govern to what degree a landowner can alter the drainage from their parcel.

Drainage options for the construction industry include:

- Point drainage, which intercepts water at gullies (points). Gullies connect to drainage pipes beneath the ground surface, so deep excavation is required to facilitate this system. Support for deep trenches is required in the shape of planking, strutting or shoring.
- Channel drainage, which intercepts water along the entire run of the channel. Channel drainage is typically manufactured from concrete, steel, polymer or composites. The interception rate of channel drainage is greater than point drainage and the excavation required is usually much less deep.

The surface opening of channel drainage usually comes in the form of gratings (polymer, plastic, steel or iron) or a single slot (slot drain) that run along the ground surface (typically manufactured from steel or iron).

=== In retaining walls ===
Earth retaining structures such as retaining walls also need to have groundwater drainage considered during their construction. Typical retaining walls are constructed of impermeable material, which can block the path of groundwater. When groundwater flow is obstructed, hydrostatic water pressure buildups against the wall and may cause significant damage. If the water pressure is not drained appropriately, retaining walls can bow, move, and fracture, causing seams to separate. The water pressure can also erode soil particles, leading to voids behind the wall and sinkholes in the above soil. Traditional retaining wall drainage systems can include French drains, drain pipes or weep holes. To prevent soil erosion, geotextile filter fabrics are installed with the drainage system.

=== In planters ===
Drainage in planters refers to the implementation of effective drainage systems specifically designed for plant containers or pots. Proper drainage is crucial in planters to prevent waterlogging and promote healthy plant growth. Planter Drainage involves the incorporation of drainage holes, drainage layers, or specialized drainage systems to ensure excess water can escape from the planter. This helps to prevent root rot, water accumulation, and other issues that can negatively impact plant health. By providing adequate drainage in planters, it supports optimal plant growth and contributes to the overall success of gardening or landscaping projects.

Drainage options for the planter include:

- Surface drains are typically used to manage runoff from paved surfaces, such as sidewalks and parking lots. Catch basins, which collect water and debris, are connected to underground pipes that carry the water away from the site.
- Subsurface drains, on the other hand, are designed to manage water that seeps into the soil beneath the planting surface. French drains, which are gravel-filled trenches with perforated pipes at the bottom, are the most common type of subsurface drain. Trench drains, which are similar but shallower and wider, are also used in some situations.

== Reasons for artificial drainage ==
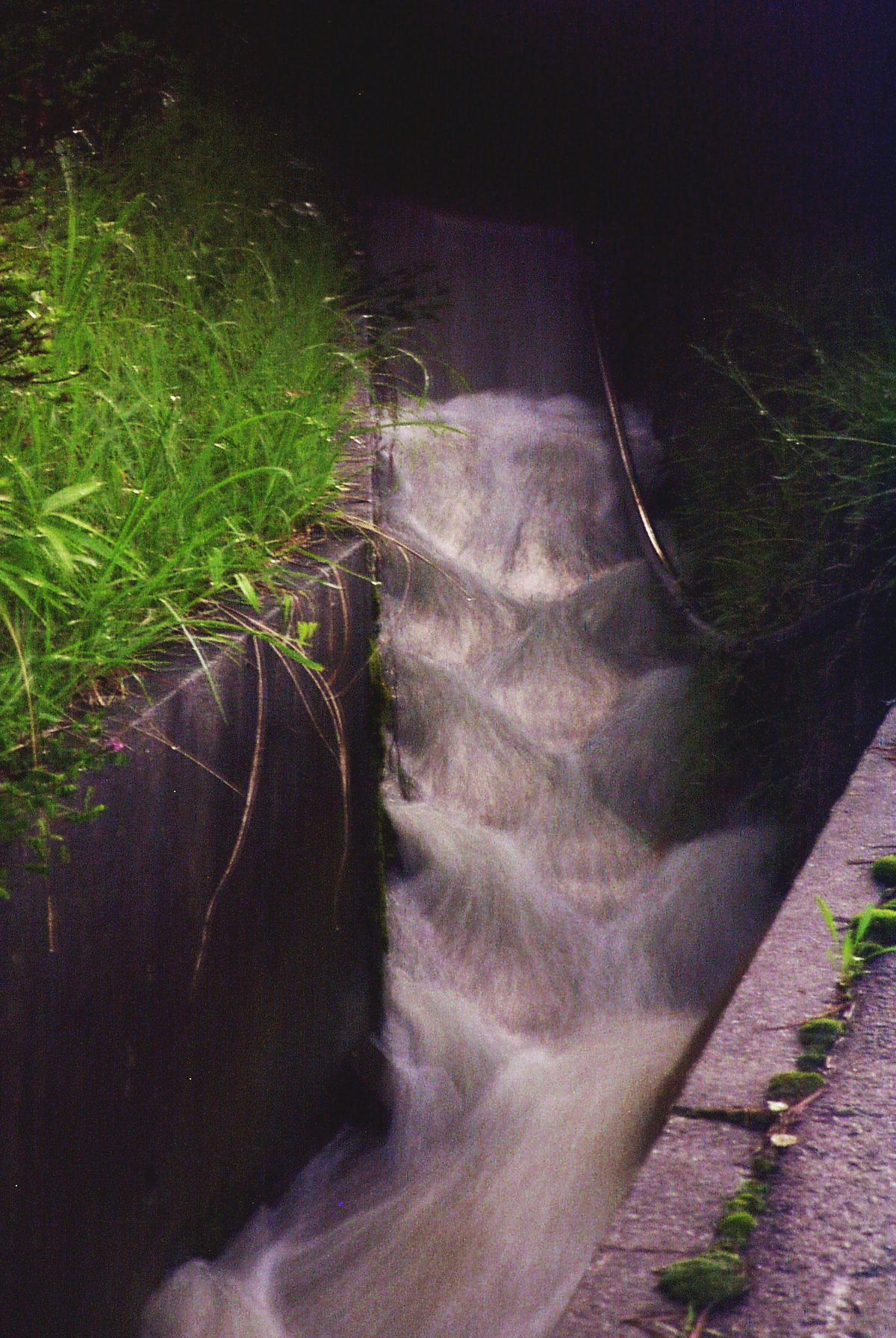
An agricultural drainage channel outside Magome, Japan, after a heavy rain. Protuberances create turbulent water, preventing sediment from settling in the channel.

Wetland soils may need drainage to be used for agriculture. In the northern United States and Europe, glaciation created numerous small lakes, which gradually filled with humus to make marshes. Some of these were drained using open ditches and trenches to make mucklands, which are primarily used for high-value crops such as vegetables.

The world's largest project of this type has been in process for centuries in the Netherlands. The area between Amsterdam, Haarlem and Leiden was, in prehistoric times, swampland and small lakes. Turf cutting (peat mining), subsidence and shoreline erosion gradually caused the formation of one large lake, the Haarlemmermeer, or lake of Haarlem. The invention of wind-powered pumping engines in the 15th century permitted some of the marginal land drainage. Still, the final drainage of the lake had to await the design of large steam-powered pumps and agreements between regional authorities. The lake was eliminated between 1849 and 1852, creating thousands of km^{2} of new land.

Coastal plains and river deltas may have seasonally or permanently high water tables and must have drainage improvements if they are to be used for agriculture. An example is the flatwoods citrus-growing region of Florida, United States. After periods of high rainfall, drainage pumps are employed to prevent damage to the citrus groves from overly wet soils. Rice production requires complete water control, as fields must be flooded or drained at different stages of the crop cycle. The Netherlands has also led the way in this type of drainage by draining lowlands along the shore and pushing back the sea until the original nation has been greatly enlarged.

In moist climates, soils may be adequate for cropping with the exception that they become waterlogged for brief periods each year, from snow melt or from heavy rains. Soils that are predominantly clay will pass water very slowly downward. Meanwhile, plant roots suffocate because the excessive water around the roots eliminates air movement through the soil.

Other soils may have an impervious layer of mineralized soil, called a hardpan, or relatively impervious rock layers may underlie shallow soils. Drainage is especially important in tree fruit production. Soils that are otherwise excellent may be waterlogged for a week of the year, which is sufficient to kill fruit trees and cost the productivity of the land until replacements can be established. In each of these cases, appropriate drainage carries off temporary flushes of water to prevent damage to annual or perennial crops.

Drier areas are often farmed by irrigation, and one would not consider drainage necessary. However, irrigation water always contains minerals and salts, which can be concentrated to toxic levels by evapotranspiration. Irrigated land may need periodic flushes with excessive irrigation water and drainage to control soil salinity.

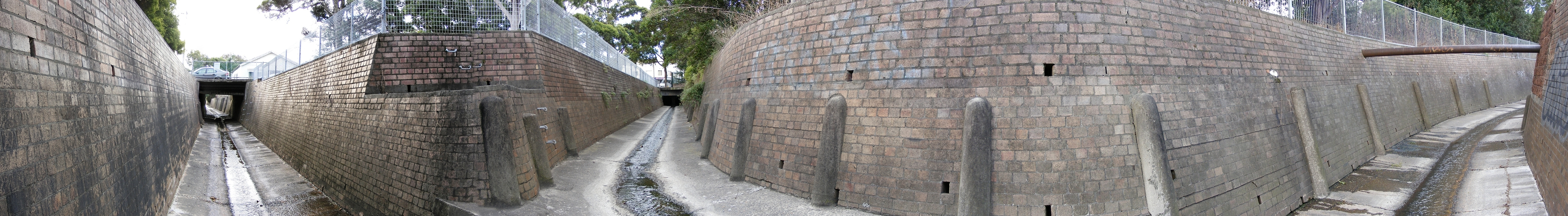
A typical drain in Bankstown, New South Wales, Australia

== See also ==
- Surface drainage of the land
  - Drainage system (geomorphology), pattern of natural drains, streams, rivers, etc.
  - Land drainage in the United Kingdom - a legal and operational term in the UK to define a range of functions and responsibilities of drainage boards.
  - Surface runoff, surface runoff of excess rainfall from the land
  - Drainage system (agriculture), land forming or land shaping to enhance the drainage from the soil surface in agricultural land
  - Contour plowing, controlling runoff and soil erosion
- Subsurface (groundwater) drainage
  - Horizontal drainage by pipes and ditches
    - Tile drainage
  - Vertical drainage by wells
    - Well drainage
    - Watertable control

Otherwise:

- Bar ditch
- Building construction
- Deep drainage
- Drain commissioner
- Drain (plumbing)
- Drainage basin or watershed
- Drainage divide or watershed
- Drainage equation
- Drainage research
- Geomorphology
- Hydrologic Evaluation of Landfill Performance
- Hydrology
- John Johnston, who introduced land drainage to the United States.
- Plumbing
  - Potable cold and hot water supply
  - Septic systems
  - Sewage traps, drains, and vents
- Rain gutter
- Retaining wall
- Sewage collection and disposal
- Soil salinity control by subsurface drainage
- Storm drain
- Stormwater
- Trench drain
- Trencher (machine)
- Urban exploration
