= Impact of self-driving cars =

The impact of self-driving cars is anticipated to be wide-ranging in many areas of daily life. Self-driving cars (also known as autonomous vehicles or AVs) have been the subject of significant research on their environmental, practical, and lifestyle consequences and their impacts remain debated.

Some experts claim substantial reduction in traffic collisions and the resulting severe injuries or deaths. United States government estimates suggest 94% of traffic collisions have humans as the final critical element in crash, with one study estimating that converting 90% of cars on US roads to AVs would save 25,000 lives per year. Other experts claim that the number of human error collisions is overestimated and that self-driving cars may actually increase collisions.

Self-driving cars are speculated to worsen air pollution, noise pollution, and sedentary lifestyles, to increase productivity and housing affordability, reclaim land used for parking, cause greater energy use, traffic congestion and sprawl. The impact of self-driving cars on absolute levels of individual car use is not yet clear; other forms of self-driving vehicles, such as self-driving buses, may actually decrease car use and congestion.

AVs are anticipated to affect the healthcare, insurance, travel, and logistics fields. Auto insurance costs are expected to decrease, and the burden of cars on the healthcare system to reduced. Self-driving cars are predicted to cause significant job losses in the transportation industry.

== Automobile industry ==
A McKinsey report has forecast that AVs could reach $300 to $400 billion in revenue by 2035. The industry has attracted multiple car manufacturers, most notably General Motor's subsidiary Cruise and Tesla. Ford and Volkswagen invested billions in Argo AI but withdraw from the market by 2022, instead focusing on semi-autonomous driving (L2+, L3 under SAE classification). Notably, non-car manufacturers have also investigated and speculated about self-driving cars, including Google subsidiary Waymo, among others.

To help reduce the possibility of safety issues, some companies have begun to open-source parts of their driverless systems. Udacity for instance is developing an open-source software stack, and some companies are having similar approaches.

== Public health ==
=== Car crash reduction ===
==== Proponents ====
Estimates of numbers of crashes prevented by AVs varies widely. An NHSTA report in 2018 found that 94% of crashes had humans as the final causal step in a chain of events. One study claimed that if 90% of cars in the US became self-driving, an estimated 25,000 lives would be saved annually. Lives saved by averting automobile crashes in the US has been valued at more than $200 billion annually. Other studies claim self-driving car would have the potential to save 10 million lives worldwide, per decade. Opponents argue that the number of human driven crashes is taken out of context and estimates of lives saved may not be accurate.

Driving safety experts predict that once driverless technology has been fully developed, traffic collisions (and resulting deaths and injuries and costs) caused by human error, such as delayed reaction time, tailgating, rubbernecking, and other forms of distracted or aggressive driving would be substantially reduced. Some experts advocate the idea of a "smart city" and claim data sharing infrastructure with AVs could further reduce crashes.

==== Opponents ====
Lack of data remains a key challenge in comparisons of fatalities per million miles between AVs and humans. One limited early study claimed a rate of 9.1 crashes per million miles by AVs, nearly double the rate from human driving, though crashes were less serious than humans. Arstechnica calculated 102 crashes over 6 million miles, but claimed crashes were low-impact and still safer than human driving. Waymo claimed only 3 crashes with injuries over 7.1 million miles, nearly twice as safe as human drivers. As more cities give permission for AVs to operate, incidents and complaints have increased.

Opponents of AVs have argued that current self-driving technology fails to take into account "edge cases" which may make the technology more dangerous than human driving. In 2017, driving experts were contacted by "TheDrive.com", operated byTime magazine, to rank autopilot systems. None ranked any of the autopilot systems at the time as safer than human driving. Factors that reduce safety may include unexpected interactions between humans and vehicle systems; complications due to technical limitations of technologies; the effect of the bugs that inevitably occur in complex interdependent software systems; sensor or data shortcomings; and compromise by malicious actors. Security problems include what an autonomous car might do if summoned to pick up the owner but another person attempts entry, what happens if someone tries to break into the car, and what happens if someone attacks the occupants, for example by exchanging gunfire.

One ethicist argued that autonomous vehicles requiring any human supervision would create complacency and would be immoral to deploy. Specifically, they argued humans are unlikely to effectively take over during a sudden software failure if an impending decision is required immediately. Research shows that drivers in automated cars react later when they have to intervene in a critical situation, compared to if they were driving manually.

=== Other public health impacts ===
According to a 2020 Annual Review of Public Health review of the literature, self-driving cars "could increase some health risks (such as air pollution, noise, and sedentarism); however, if properly regulated, AVs will likely reduce morbidity and mortality from motor vehicle crashes and may help reshape cities to promote healthy urban environments."

An unexpected disadvantage of the widespread acceptance of autonomous vehicles would be a reduction in the supply of organs for donation. In the US, for example, 13% of the organ donation supply comes from car crash victims.

== Welfare ==
According to a 2020 study, self-driving cars will increase productivity, and housing affordability, as well as reclaim land used for parking. However, self-driving cars will cause greater energy use, traffic congestion and sprawl. Automated cars could reduce labor costs; relieve travelers from driving and navigation chores, thereby replacing behind-the-wheel commuting hours with more time for leisure or work; and also would lift constraints on occupant ability to drive, distracted and texting while driving, intoxicated, prone to seizures, or otherwise impaired.

For the young, the elderly, people with disabilities, and low-income citizens, automated cars could provide enhanced mobility. The removal of the steering wheel—along with the remaining driver interface and the requirement for any occupant to assume a forward-facing position—would give the interior of the cabin greater ergonomic flexibility. Large vehicles, such as motorhomes, would attain appreciably enhanced ease of use.

The elderly and persons with disabilities (such as persons who are hearing-impaired, vision-impaired, mobility-impaired, or cognitively-impaired) are potential beneficiaries of adoption of autonomous vehicles; however, the extent to which such populations gain greater mobility from the adoption of AV technology depends on the specific designs and regulations adopted.

Children and teens, who are not able to drive a vehicle themselves in case of student transport, would also benefit of the introduction of autonomous cars. Daycares and schools are able to come up with automated pick-up and drop-off systems by car in addition to walking, cycling and busing, causing a decrease of reliance on parents and childcare workers.

The extent to which human actions are necessary for driving will vanish. Since current vehicles require human actions to some extent, the driving school industry will not be disrupted until the majority of autonomous transportation is switched to the emerged dominant design. It is plausible that in the distant future driving a vehicle will be considered as a luxury, which implies that the structure of the industry is based on new entrants and a new market. Self-driving cars would also exasperate existing mobility inequalities driven by the interests of car companies and technology companies while taking investment away from more equitable and sustainable mobility initiatives such as public transportation.

== Urban planning ==
According to a Wonkblog reporter, if fully automated cars become commercially available, they have the potential to be a disruptive innovation with major implications for society. The likelihood of widespread adoption is still unclear, but if they are used on a wide scale, policymakers face a number of unresolved questions about their effects.

One fundamental question is about their effect on travel behavior. Some people believe that they will increase car ownership and car use because it will become easier to use them and they will ultimately be more useful. This may, in turn, encourage urban sprawl and ultimately total private vehicle use. Others argue that it will be easier to share cars and that this will thus discourage outright ownership and decrease total usage, and make cars more efficient forms of transportation in relation to the present situation.

Policy-makers will have to take a new look at how infrastructure is to be built and how money will be allotted to build for automated vehicles. The need for traffic signals could potentially be reduced with the adoption of smart highways. Due to smart highways and with the assistance of smart technological advances implemented by policy change, the dependence on oil imports may be reduced because of less time being spent on the road by individual cars which could have an effect on policy regarding energy. On the other hand, automated vehicles could increase the overall number of cars on the road which could lead to a greater dependence on oil imports if smart systems are not enough to curtail the impact of more vehicles. However, due to the uncertainty of the future of automated vehicles, policymakers may want to plan effectively by implementing infrastructure improvements that can be beneficial to both human drivers and automated vehicles. Caution needs to be taken in acknowledgment to public transportation and that the use may be greatly reduced if automated vehicles are catered to through policy reform of infrastructure with this resulting in job loss and increased unemployment.

Other disruptive effects will come from the use of automated vehicles to carry goods. Self-driving vans have the potential to make home deliveries significantly cheaper, transforming retail commerce and possibly making hypermarkets and supermarkets redundant. As of 2019 the US Department of Transportation defines automation into six levels, starting at level zero which means the human driver does everything and ending with level five, the automated system performs all the driving tasks. Also under the current law, manufacturers bear all the responsibility to self-certify vehicles for use on public roads. This means that currently as long as the vehicle is compliant within the regulatory framework, there are no specific federal legal barriers in the US to a highly automated vehicle being offered for sale. Iyad Rahwan, an associate professor in the MIT Media Lab said, "Most people want to live in a world where cars will minimize casualties, but everyone wants their own car to protect them at all costs." Furthermore, industry standards and best practice are still needed in systems before they can be considered reasonably safe under real-world conditions.

== Traffic ==
Additional advantages could include higher speed limits; smoother rides; and increased roadway capacity; and minimized traffic congestion, due to decreased need for safety gaps and higher speeds. Currently, maximum controlled-access highway throughput or capacity according to the US Highway Capacity Manual is about 2,200 passenger vehicles per hour per lane, with about 5% of the available road space is taken up by cars. One study estimated that automated cars could increase capacity by 273% (≈8,200 cars per hour per lane). The study also estimated that with 100% connected vehicles using vehicle-to-vehicle communication, capacity could reach 12,000 passenger vehicles per hour (up 545% from 2,200 pc/h per lane) traveling safely at 120 km/h (75 mph) with a following gap of about 6 m (20 ft) of each other. Human drivers at highway speeds keep between 40 and 50 m (130 and 160 ft) away from the vehicle in front. These increases in highway capacity could have a significant impact in traffic congestion, particularly in urban areas, and even effectively end highway congestion in some places. The ability for authorities to manage traffic flow would increase, given the extra data and driving behavior predictability combined with less need for traffic police and even road signage.

== Insurance ==
Safer driving is expected to reduce the costs of vehicle insurance. The automobile insurance industry might suffer as the technology makes certain aspects of these occupations obsolete. As fewer collisions implicate less money spent on repair costs, the role of the insurance industry is likely to be altered as well. It can be expected that the increased safety of transport due to autonomous vehicles will lead to a decrease in payouts for the insurers, which is positive for the industry, but fewer payouts may imply a demand drop for insurances in general.

In order to accommodate such changes, the Automated and Electric Vehicles Act 2018 was introduced. While Part 2 deals with Electric Vehicles, Part 1 covers insurance provisions for automated vehicles.

== Labor market ==
=== Driving-related jobs ===
A direct impact of widespread adoption of automated vehicles is the loss of driving-related jobs in the road transport industry. There could be resistance from professional drivers and unions who are threatened by job losses. In addition, there could be job losses in public transit services and crash repair shops. A frequently cited paper by Michael Osborne and Carl Benedikt Frey found that automated cars would make many jobs redundant. The industry has, however created thousands of jobs in low-income countries for workers who train autonomous systems.

=== Taxis ===
With the aforementioned ambiguous user preference regarding the personal ownership of autonomous vehicles, it is possible that the current mobility provider trend will continue as it rises in popularity. Established providers such as Uber and Lyft are already significantly present within the industry, and it is likely that new entrants will enter when business opportunities arise.

== Energy and environmental impacts ==
=== Vehicle use ===
A review found that private autonomous vehicles may increase total travel, whereas autonomous buses may lead to reduced car use.

Vehicle automation can improve fuel economy of the car by optimizing the drive cycle, as well as increasing congested traffic speeds by an estimated 8%–13%. Reduced traffic congestion and the improvements in traffic flow due to widespread use of automated cars will translate into higher fuel efficiency, ranging from a 23%–39% increase, with the potential to further increase. Additionally, self-driving cars will be able to accelerate and brake more efficiently, meaning higher fuel economy from reducing wasted energy typically associated with inefficient changes to speed. However, the improvement in vehicle energy efficiency does not necessarily translate to net reduction in energy consumption and positive environmental outcomes.

Alongside the induced demand, there may also be a reduction in the use of more sustainable modes, such as public or active transport. It is expected that convenience of the automated vehicles encourages the consumers to travel more, and this induced demand may partially or fully offset the fuel efficiency improvement brought by automation. Alongside the induced demand, there may also be a reduction in the use of more sustainable modes, such as public or active transport. Overall, the consequences of vehicle automation on global energy demand and emissions are highly uncertain, and heavily depends on the combined effect of changes in consumer behavior, policy intervention, technological progress and vehicle technology.

=== Production ===
By reducing the labor and other costs of mobility as a service, automated cars could reduce the number of cars that are individually owned, replaced by taxi/pooling and other car-sharing services. This would also dramatically reduce the size of the automotive production industry, with corresponding environmental and economic effects.

=== Indirect effects ===
The lack of stressful driving, more productive time during the trip, and the potential savings in travel time and cost could become an incentive to live far away from cities, where housing is cheaper, and work in the city's core, thus increasing travel distances and inducing more urban sprawl, raising energy consumption and enlarging the carbon footprint of urban travel. There is also the risk that traffic congestion might increase, rather than decrease. Appropriate public policies and regulations, such as zoning, pricing, and urban design are required to avoid the negative impacts of increased suburbanization and longer distance travel.

Since many autonomous vehicles are going to rely on electricity to operate, the demand for lithium batteries increases. Similarly, radar, sensors, lidar, and high-speed internet connectivity require higher auxiliary power from vehicles, which manifests as greater power draw from batteries. The larger battery requirement causes a necessary increase in the supply of these types of batteries for the chemical industry. On the other hand, with the expected increase of battery-powered (autonomous) vehicles, the petroleum industry is expected to undergo a decline in demand. As this implication depends on the adoption rate of autonomous vehicles, it is unsure to what extent this implication will disrupt this particular industry. This transition phase of oil to electricity allows companies to explore whether there are business opportunities for them in the new energy ecosystem. In 2020, Mohan, Sripad, Vaishnav & Viswanathan at Carnegie Mellon University found that the electricity consumption of all the automation technology, including sensors, computation, internet access as well as the increased drag from sensors causes up to a 15% impact on the range of an automated electric vehicle, therefore, implying that the larger battery requirement might not be as large as previously assumed.

== Self-parking and parking space ==
=== Self-parking ===
A study conducted by AAA Foundation for Traffic Safety found that drivers did not trust self-parking technology, even though the systems outperformed drivers with a backup camera. The study tested self-parking systems in a variety of vehicles (Lincoln MKC, Mercedes-Benz ML400 4Matic, Cadillac CTS-V Sport, BMW i3 and Jeep Cherokee Limited) and found that self-parking cars hit the curb 81% fewer times, used 47% fewer manoeuvres and parked 10% faster than drivers. Yet, only 25% of those surveyed said they would trust this technology.

=== Parking space ===
Manually driven vehicles are reported to be used only 4–5% of the time, and being parked and unused for the remaining 95–96% of the time. Autonomous taxis could, on the other hand, be used continuously after they have reached their destination. This could dramatically reduce the need for parking space. For example, in Los Angeles a 2015 study found 14% of the land is used for parking alone, equivalent to some 1,702 hectares (4,210 acres). This combined with the potential reduced need for road space due to improved traffic flow, could free up large amounts of land in urban areas, which could then be used for parks, recreational areas, buildings, among other uses; making cities more livable. Besides this, privately owned self-driving cars, also capable of self-parking would provide another advantage: the ability to drop off and pick up passengers even in places where parking is prohibited. This would benefit park and ride facilities.

== Cybersecurity ==
=== Privacy ===
The vehicles' increased awareness could aid the police by reporting on illegal passenger behaviour, while possibly enabling other crimes, such as deliberately crashing into another vehicle or a pedestrian. However, this may also lead to much-expanded mass surveillance if there is wide access granted to third parties to the large data sets generated.

Privacy could be an issue when having the vehicle's location and position integrated into an interface that other people have access to. Moreover, they require a sensor-based infrastructure that would constitute an all-encompassing surveillance apparatus. This gives the car manufacturers and other companies the data needed to understand the user's lifestyle and personal preferences.

=== Terrorist scenarios ===
There is the risk of terrorist attacks by automotive hacking through the sharing of information through V2V (Vehicle to Vehicle) and V2I (Vehicle to Infrastructure) protocols. Self-driving cars could potentially be loaded with explosives and used as bombs. According to legislation of US lawmakers, autonomous and self-driving vehicles should be equipped with defences against hacking.

== Car repair ==
As collisions are less likely to occur, and the risk for human errors is reduced significantly, the repair industry will face an enormous reduction of work that has to be done on the reparation of car frames. Meanwhile, as the generated data of the autonomous vehicle is likely to predict when certain replaceable parts are in need of maintenance, car owners and the repair industry will be able to proactively replace a part that will fail soon. This "Asset Efficiency Service" would implicate a productivity gain for the automotive repair industry.

== Rescue, emergency response, and military ==
The technique used in autonomous driving also ensures life savings in other industries. The implementation of autonomous vehicles with rescue, emergency response, and military applications has already led to a decrease in deaths. Military personnel use autonomous vehicles to reach dangerous and remote places on earth to deliver fuel, food and general supplies and even rescue people. In addition, a future implication of adopting autonomous vehicles could lead to a reduction in deployed personnel, which will lead to a decrease in injuries, since the technological development allows autonomous vehicles to become more and more autonomous. Another future implication is the reduction of emergency drivers when autonomous vehicles are deployed as fire trucks or ambulances. An advantage could be the use of real-time traffic information and other generated data to determine and execute routes more efficiently than human drivers. The time savings can be invaluable in these situations.

== Interior design and entertainment ==
With the driver decreasingly focused on operating a vehicle, the interior design and media-entertainment industry will have to reconsider what passengers of autonomous vehicles are doing when they are on the road. Vehicles need to be redesigned, and possibly even be prepared for multipurpose usage. In practice, it will show that travellers have more time for business and/or leisure. In both cases, this gives increasing opportunities for the media-entertainment industry to demand attention. Moreover, the advertisement business is able to provide location-based ads without risking driver safety.

== Connected vehicle ==
All cars can benefit from information and connections, but autonomous cars "Will be fully capable of operating without C-V2X." In addition, the earlier mentioned entertainment industry is also highly dependent on this network to be active in this market segment. This implies higher revenues for the telecommunication industry.

== Hospitality industry and airlines ==
Driver interactions with the vehicle will be less common within the near future, and in the more distant future, the responsibility will lie entirely with the vehicle. As indicated above, this will have implications for the entertainment- and interior design industry. For roadside restaurants, the implication will be that the need for customers to stop driving and enter the restaurant will vanish, and the autonomous vehicle will have a double function. Moreover, accompanied by the rise of disruptive platforms such as Airbnb that have shaken up the hotel industry, the fast increase of developments within the autonomous vehicle industry might cause another implication for their customer bases. In the more distant future, the implication for motels might be that a decrease in guests will occur, since autonomous vehicles could be redesigned as fully equipped bedrooms. The improvements regarding the interior of the vehicles might additionally have implications for the airline industry. In the case of relatively short-haul flights, waiting times at customs or the gate imply lost time and hassle for customers. With the improved convenience in future car travel, it is possible that customers might go for this option, causing a loss in customer bases for the airline industry.
