= Image2Text =

Computer software

Image2Text technology was created by Cortica, an Israel-based startup whose technology simulates the performance of the human cortex so that computers recognize images with a high degree of accuracy. Image2Text is the result of 10 years in research and development and is protected by more than 50 patents.

== Product Differentiation ==
Cortica's engine processes and recognizes images based on patterns, as the brain does, providing accuracy purporting to be comparable with that of the human brain.

Previous image search solutions have relied on databases of images compiled through fingerprinting, modeling and crowdsourcing. Cortica differentiates itself from these other products; patterns are clustered into digital concepts, which are stored and mapped to keywords and contextual taxonomies that enable it to interpret the content appearing in the digital media.

== Uses ==
Cortica's Image2Text technology associates images with concepts and enables a host of business opportunities. The technology has implications for augmented reality, a visual technology that experts say will improve when it incorporates computer vision and dynamic mapping of the real world environment. In addition, computer vision technologies, like those guided by Image2Text, have been integrated into self-driving cars to help identify road hazards.
