= Some Dudes Can Fight =

- Produced by: American Mutoscope Company
- Distributed by: American Mutoscope Company
- Release date: May 1898 (U.S.)
- Country: United States
- Languages: Silent film English intertitles

Some Dudes Can Fight is 48.77 meter American silent film made in May 1898. The film was produced and distributed by American Mutoscope Company, the first company in the United States devoted entirely to film production and exhibition.

== Plot ==
A ruffian from the Bowery sees a dandy young man approaching him and decides to taunt the well-dressed fellow. The young "dude" ignores the ruffian's insults for a time before losing his patience. He then punches the aggressor in the jaw with a right-handed swing and follows it up with a series of additional blows so that "in less time than it takes to tell (the thug from the Bowery) is on his back in the gutter begging for mercy."
