= Road debris =

Road hazard caused by buildup of dirt and waste

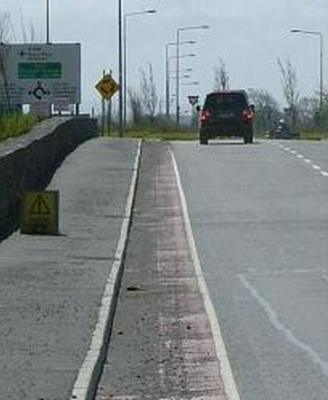
Debris in Galway, Ireland accumulating on a cycle lane

Road debris, a form of road hazard, is debris that accumulates on or off a road. Road debris includes substances, materials, and objects that are foreign to the normal roadway environment. Debris may be produced by vehicular or non-vehicular sources and is a form of solid waste. Debris may tend to collect in areas where vehicles do not drive, such as on the edges (shoulder), around traffic islands, and junctions.

Road spray or tire kickup is road debris (usually liquid water) that has been kicked up, pushed out, or sprayed out from, a tire. In 2004, a AAA Foundation for Traffic Safety study revealed that vehicle-related road debris caused 25,000 accidents and nearly 100 deaths a year.

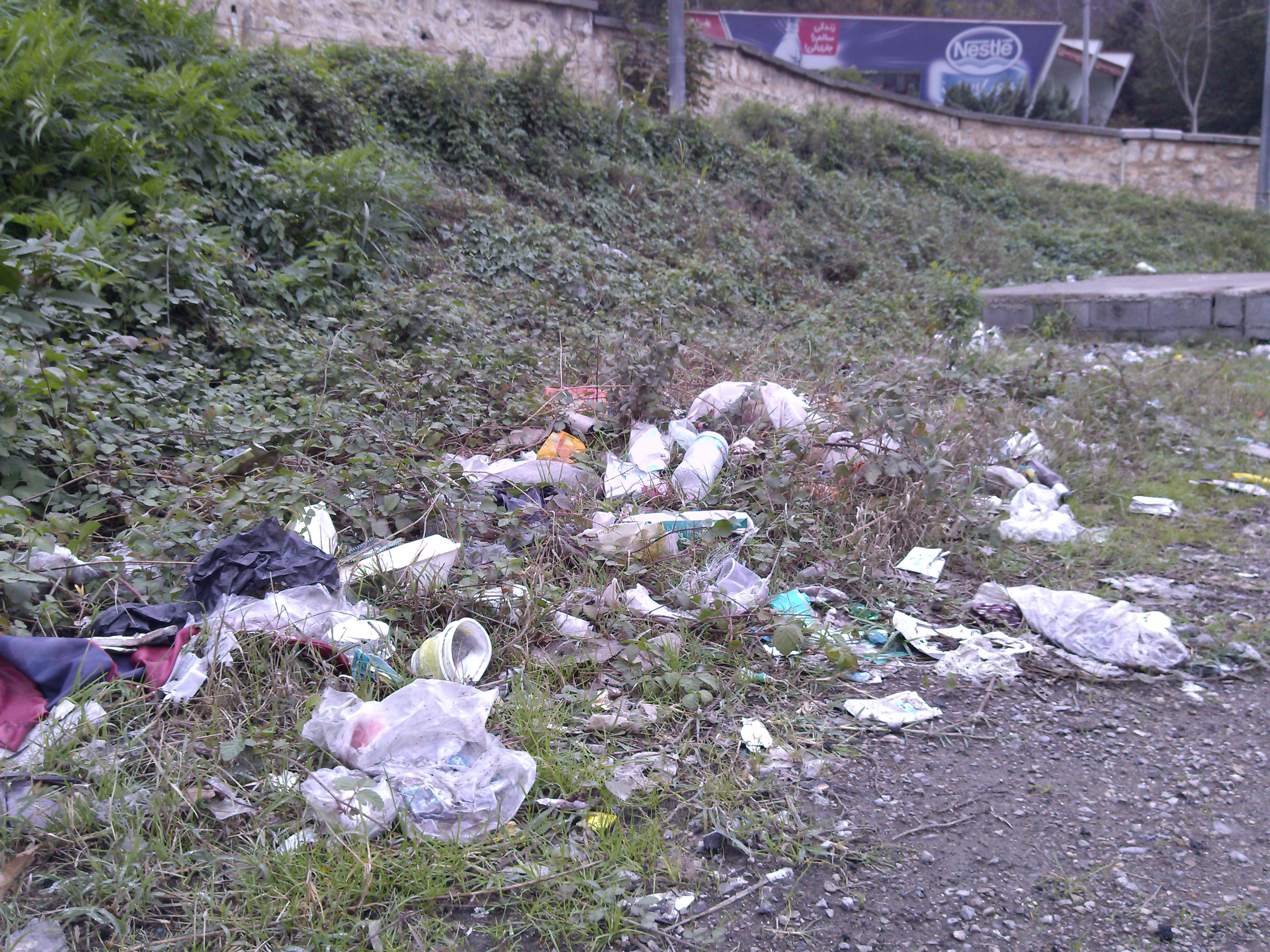
Waste in Amol, behind Haraz Road (Road 77), Iran

== Causes ==
Road debris can be caused by various factors, including objects falling off vehicles or natural disasters and weather, specifically wind, storms, tornadoes, hurricanes, etc.

== Examples ==
Plant seeds scattered on a road, dispersed by a fast-moving car

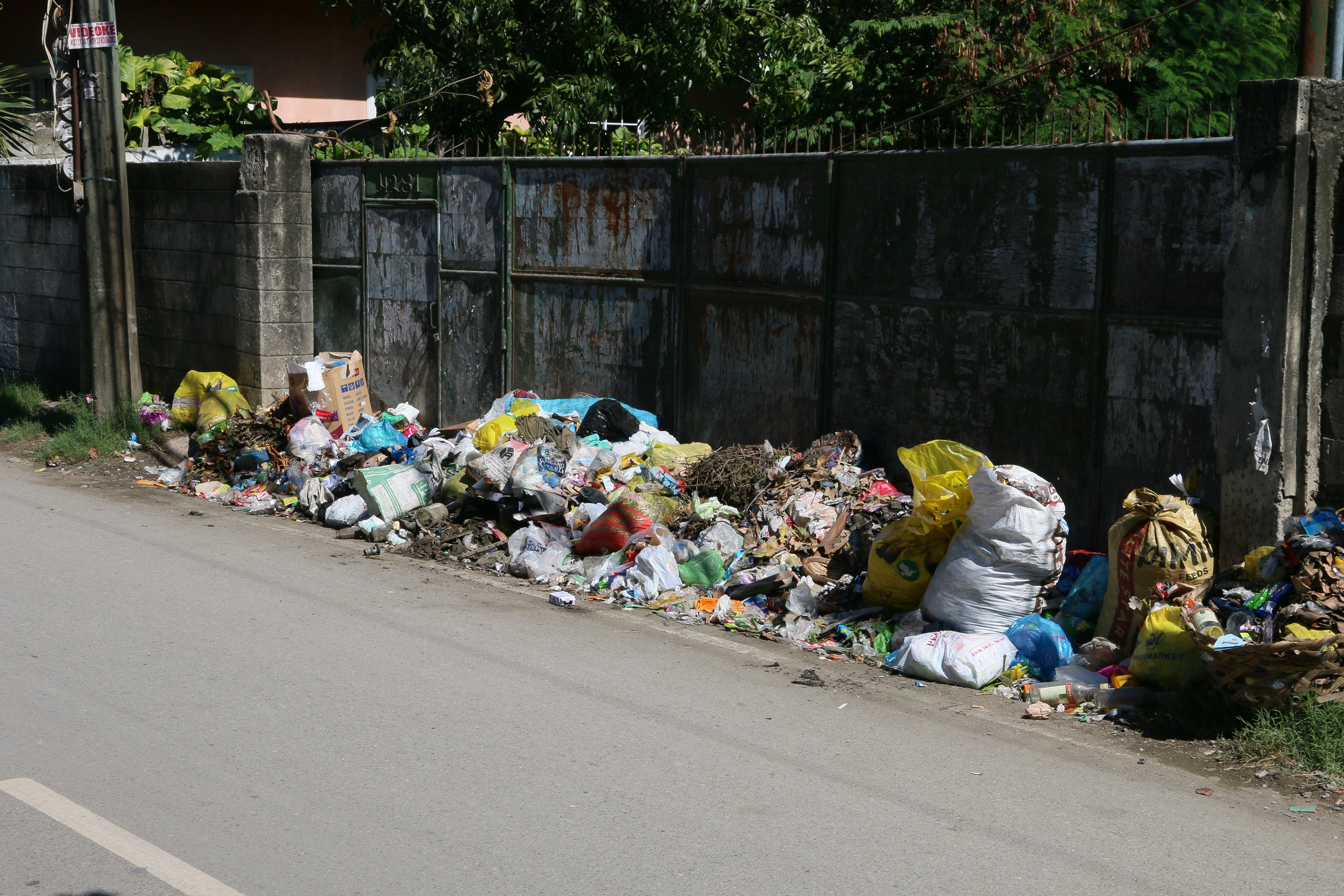
Garbage and waste dumped near a road in Talisay, Cebu. Extreme form of roadside litter containing all types of waste materials: plastic, metal, glass, paper, cardboard and biowaste.

Examples of road debris include:

- Particulates, dust, dirt, sand, and mud
- Asphalt, concrete, pebbles, rocks/stones/boulders, etc.
- Particles of road salt and other de-icers
- Litter, food waste, animal waste (urine, feces, manure etc.), discarded furniture, electrical appliances, mattresses, and other items of garbage, trash, rubbish and refuse
- Broken glass, nails, screws, pins and other often sharp objects
- Car parts, tire tread, etc.
- Bicycles, roof racks, luggage, lumber, construction materials, pallets, crates, and other solid objects that are accidentally or deliberately dropped from moving vehicles
- Dead animal corpses (roadkill)
- Broken glass, metals, plastics, and other solid materials that fall off vehicles during traffic collisions
- Ice, snow, rain water (puddles or flooding), and other liquids such as animal urine, spilled grease, gasoline (petrol), diesel fuel and motor oil
- Plants and their parts: branches, leaves, sticks, twigs, seeds, or grass clippings.

== Effects ==
=== Road surface ===
Road debris is a hazard that can cause loss of vehicle control with damages ranging from a flat tire, vehicular rollover, penetration of the passenger compartment by the debris, to a serious collision, with accompanying injuries or deaths. In the year 2011, the National Highway Traffic Safety Administration's Traffic Safety Facts found that more than 800 persons were killed across America by "non-fixed objects" (a term that includes roadway debris). California had the highest number of total deaths for any state, while New Mexico had the greatest probability for death from a vehicle-debris crash in that year.

In 2004, a AAA Foundation for Traffic Safety study revealed that vehicle-related road debris caused 25,000 accidents—and nearly 100 deaths—each year. At highway speeds, even small debris can be deadly. On June 16, 1925, in the United States, a passenger train carrying German and American tourists from Chicago, Illinois to Hoboken, New Jersey struck debris washed into a road crossing and derailed during a heavy thunderstorm. Collision with road debris resulted in a solar vehicle accident at the World Solar Challenge 2007 in Australia.

Road debris tends to collect in areas where two-track vehicles such as cars and buses do not drive. In urban areas, this tends to be on the edges (shoulder) and on the crown of the road, and debris frequently collects around traffic islands and junctions. In rural areas, debris collects in the middle of the lane and on the outside of corners and bends. Road debris can be especially dangerous to bicyclists, who may have to travel outside the cycle lane and into traffic to avoid debris.

Flooding can also occur if storm drains and street gutters are not kept clear of road debris and litter. Large quantities of water are sometimes thrown up from the road (road spray) by large vehicles, creating visibility problems for the drivers of oncoming, nearby, or following vehicles. Following vehicles may reduce the problem by slowing and increasing the following/separation distance. Headlights (or fog lights) improve vehicle visibility for all drivers, including those dealing with the spray. Driving manuals advise against following vehicles too closely (tailgating) in these hazardous conditions. Road spray can cause reduced visibility and dramatically reduce the safety of motorists. Over time, road spray and gunk from [a bicycle's] brake pads coat the rim of the wheel, interfering with braking power.

In motorsport racing, road debris can cause loss of traction and subsequent crashes. Usually, the yellow caution flag is used to indicate a track hazard, and the pace/safety car will come out.

Road debris can also cause other more specific problems and damage to vehicles. Rocks striking the catalytic converter can cause the internal mat to break and clog the converter. Several recalls have occurred due to road debris. The 2005 Scion TC's wind deflector was recalled because of potential shatter from road debris impact. The 2004 Mitsubishi Endeavor was recalled in February 2010 when it was determined that a mixture of road salt and road debris (mud) might be trapped between a reinforcing bracket and the fuel filler pipe, causing corrosion. The 2001 Chevrolet C/K chassis cab truck was also recalled on discovery that road debris could strike and damage its pressure relief valves.

=== Environmental ===
Small debris particles and dust (primarily from tire wear and vehicle exhaust particulates) constitute a significant problem when they are washed into the soil and leak into groundwater reservoirs through surface runoff, especially urban runoff. Roadside soil and water contamination can result when the concentration of harmful constituents is high enough. The greater the surface area of synthetic rubber waste fragments, the greater the potential for breakdown into harmful constituents. For leached tire debris, the potential environmental impact of the ingredients zinc and organic toxicants has been demonstrated.

Additionally, debris from lawns in local communities can flush into local waterways. There are currently some laws against blowing organic matter such as grass clippings into the roadway because of their potential toxic effect on the local waterways. Grass being high in nitrogen, which can accumulate in waterways and cause algae blooms. An example of such laws can be seen in the City of Davenport, Iowa's Clean Air and Water Act.

== Prevention ==
A car bra can help reduce damage from minor road debris. Road spray is lessened on stone mastic asphalt and open-graded asphalt and can be further reduced with fenders (more so on a bicycle since most motor vehicles tend to already have fenders) and/or mud flaps. Street sweepers and winter service vehicles remove most solid road debris and the Adopt a Highway program also helps. Road signs and variable-message signs may warn drivers of special situations involving road debris.

The American Automobile Association (AAA) publishes the following recommendations:

=== Education ===
- Motor vehicle operators should know and understand how to properly secure their loads, comply with appropriate load securing requirements, observe all relevant littering laws, and penalties for failing to comply with the regulations.
- Drivers carrying loads should periodically inspect their vehicles and cargo to make sure they remain safe and secure.
- All drivers should be aware of the surroundings and continuously inspect the road for potential hazards such as potholes.
- Drivers should immediately report unsafe vehicles and unsecured loads.

=== Laws and policy enforcement ===
- Governments should enact and enforce legislation requiring loads to be covered, or use anti-littering legislation to penalize offenders.
- Fines and demerit points for unsecured loads should be increased.
- Road debris incidents and crashes should be made an absolute-liability offense.

=== Removal and mitigation ===
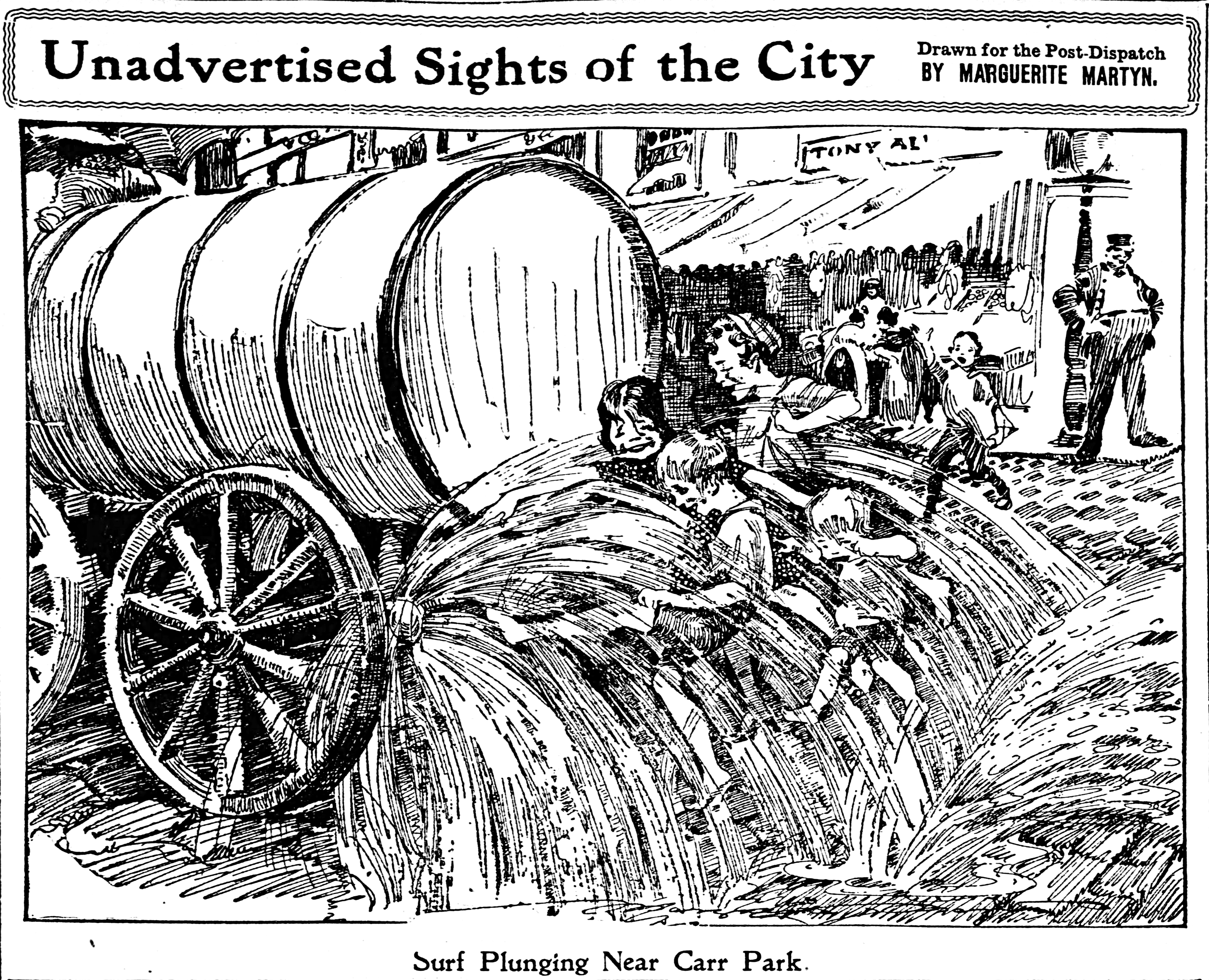
In 1914 St. Louis, Missouri, litter was removed from streets by water wagons, as shown in this drawing by Marguerite Martyn of the St. Louis Post-Dispatch.

- Maintenance organizations should perform regular road inspection and timely removal of debris.
- Better roadway design provides adequate visibility of stationary objects in the roadway to motorists traveling at highway speeds.
- Increasing the dispersion of traffic cones around roadway areas.

== Popular culture ==
Ocean Colour Scene, an English Britpop band, made a song about Birmingham, England called "Debris Road" (reputed to be about the road running past the band's recording studios in Ladywood) on their Marchin' Already 1997 album.

Some video games (particularly racing games) include road debris that damages vehicles or obstructs visibility. Spy Hunter (1983) features slippery, icy roads and puddles, oil slicks, and smoke screens. MotorStorm (2007) depicts air-borne mud that becomes accurately painted onto the body of each vehicle in real-time. Players can use this airborne debris strategically: a chunk of debris may be used to knock opponents off their motorcycles, and mud spatter on the wind-shields might temporarily blind them. Fuel (2009) features "crazy windstorms that kick up leaves and debris."

== See also ==
- Estray
- Litter
- Road slipperiness
- Roadkill
- Storm drain
- Street cleaning
- Street gutter
