= Land drainage in the United Kingdom =

Land drainage in the UK refers to the drainage of land in the United Kingdom. It has gained a specific and particular meaning as a result of a number of Acts of Parliament such as the Land Drainage Act 1991. In this context, land drainage refers to the responsibilities and activities of "internal drainage districts" and "internal drainage boards", both of which are specifically defined by relevant legislation. The land drainage responsibilities of the boards and districts are limited to works on main rivers. Such works encompass any reasonable activity to maintain an adequate channel in the river to carry a 1 in 100 year river flow event. Such activities may include dredging, weed clearing, the raising of flood embankments etc.

== See also ==
- Drainage law
- Land drainage (disambiguation)
