= Slot drain =

Linear drain used to evacuate ground water

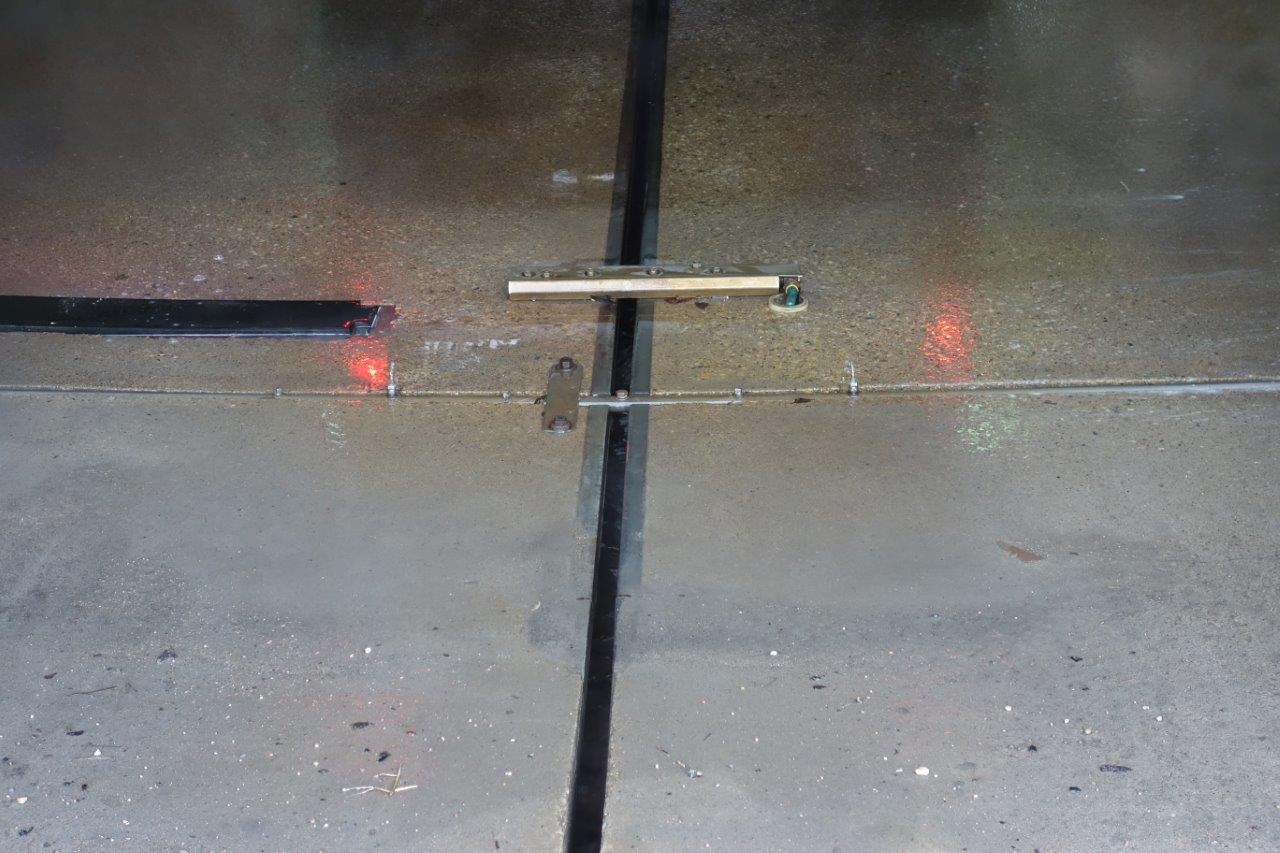
A slot drain in a car wash

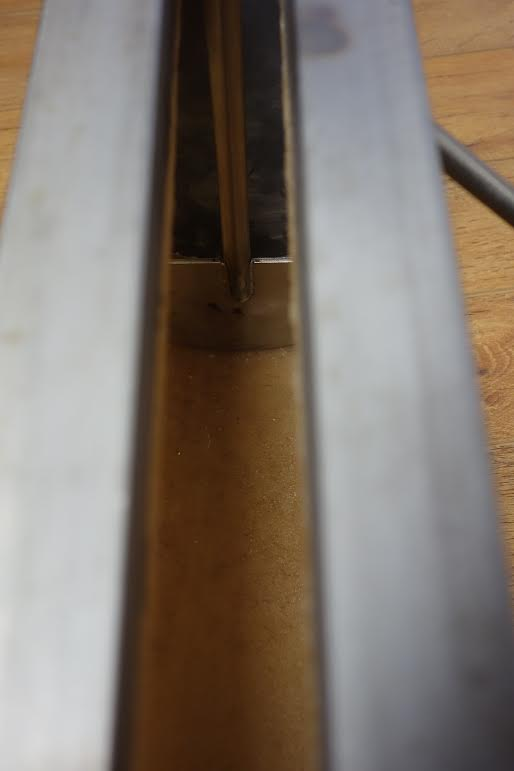
Slot Drain cleaning paddle

A slot drain is a linear drain used to evacuate water, runoff or liquids in a facility. The difference between a slot drain and the traditional trench drain is that the slot drain has no grating. In recent years, this drainage concept is more often used in both indoor and outdoor applications, such as fire stations, car washes, landscaping, shower rooms and garages, as well as highly sanitized environments like food processing plants and breweries.

A slot drain is a modified trench drain. "Slot" describes its appearance on the ground. It is preferable in areas with heavy traffic, or which require intense cleaning, because its absence of a grating simplifies cleaning and sanitation.

== Features ==
Compared to grated trench drains, the slot drain has several advantages, as it does not have any kind of grating that deteriorates, rusts or needs replacement. Slot drains are frequently used by architects, particularly landscape architects, because they can be seamlessly installed with paver stones and other outdoor landscape materials.

Easy to clean

To clean a grated trench drain, the grates on top must be removed. This can be difficult or frustrating if the grates are stuck, or tools are needed to pull them up. If it is a long run trench drain, it is time-consuming to remove the trench drain grates and put them back after cleaning. Slot drain can be cleaned by moving along a cleaning paddle to move the sediment into a catch basin.

Heavy load class

If the grates are not suitable for heavy loads, the drains could quickly deteriorate, accidents could happen when traveling across the area with a forklift, vehicle, pallet truck, cart or pedestrians. The grates increase the risk of personal injury and result in lost time. The slot drain concept was first introduced to solve such problems. By eliminating the needs for grates, there is no concern about breaking. The concrete sustains most of the weight and the slot opening is usually only 0.5 to 1.5 inches (1 to 4 cm).

Capacity of evacuating water

Slot drains are able to disperse water at a flow rate of between 38 litres and 44 litres per minute.
