= Hydrologic Evaluation of Landfill Performance =

The Hydrologic Evaluation of Landfill Performance (HELP) model is a quasi-two-dimensional hydrologic numerical model for conducting water balance analysis of landfills, cover systems, and other solid waste containment facilities; it was developed for the United States Environmental Protection Agency.

== Versions ==
- Public domain (free) version:
  - HELP v4.0 – Microsoft Excel-based version developed by EPA ORD's Center for Environmental Solutions and Emergency Management, HELP 4 user manual and further documentation for HELP v3.0
- Commercial versions:
  - Visual HELP – based on the HELP version 3.07, offers a Microsoft Windows GUI to view and edit soil profiles and to generate weather data.
  - HELP 3.95 D – by Dr. Klaus Berger at the University of Hamburg; offers a Microsoft Windows UI and includes the model HELP 3.07 and the enhanced model HELP 3.95 D.
