= Bar ditch =

Roadside channel dug for drainage purposes

A bar or borrow ditch is a roadside channel dug for drainage purposes. Typically, the dirt is "borrowed" from the ditch, and used to crown the road. It is a variation of a bar or borrow pit, in construction, when dirt is removed and used for construction purposes, and later left to fill with water, forming ponds or lakes. If the ditch is adjacent to pasturage, it also confines livestock, keeping them from straying onto the road. The term is most often used in the Southwestern United States.
