= Street gutter =

Depression beside a road for collecting rainwater

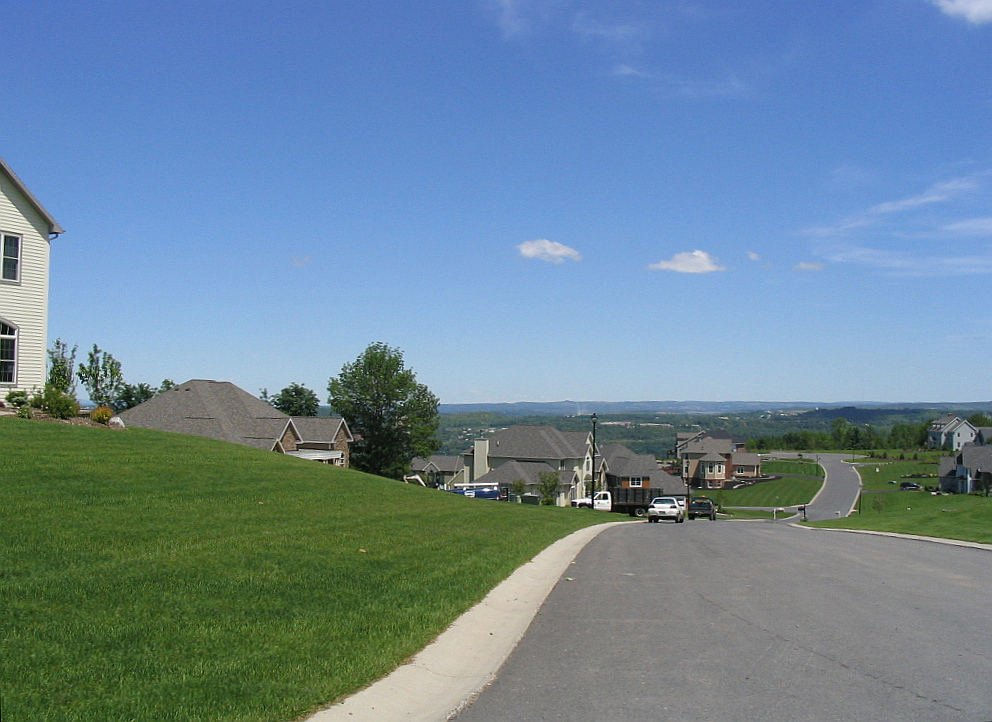
Shallow gutter typical of late 20th century North American low density suburbs

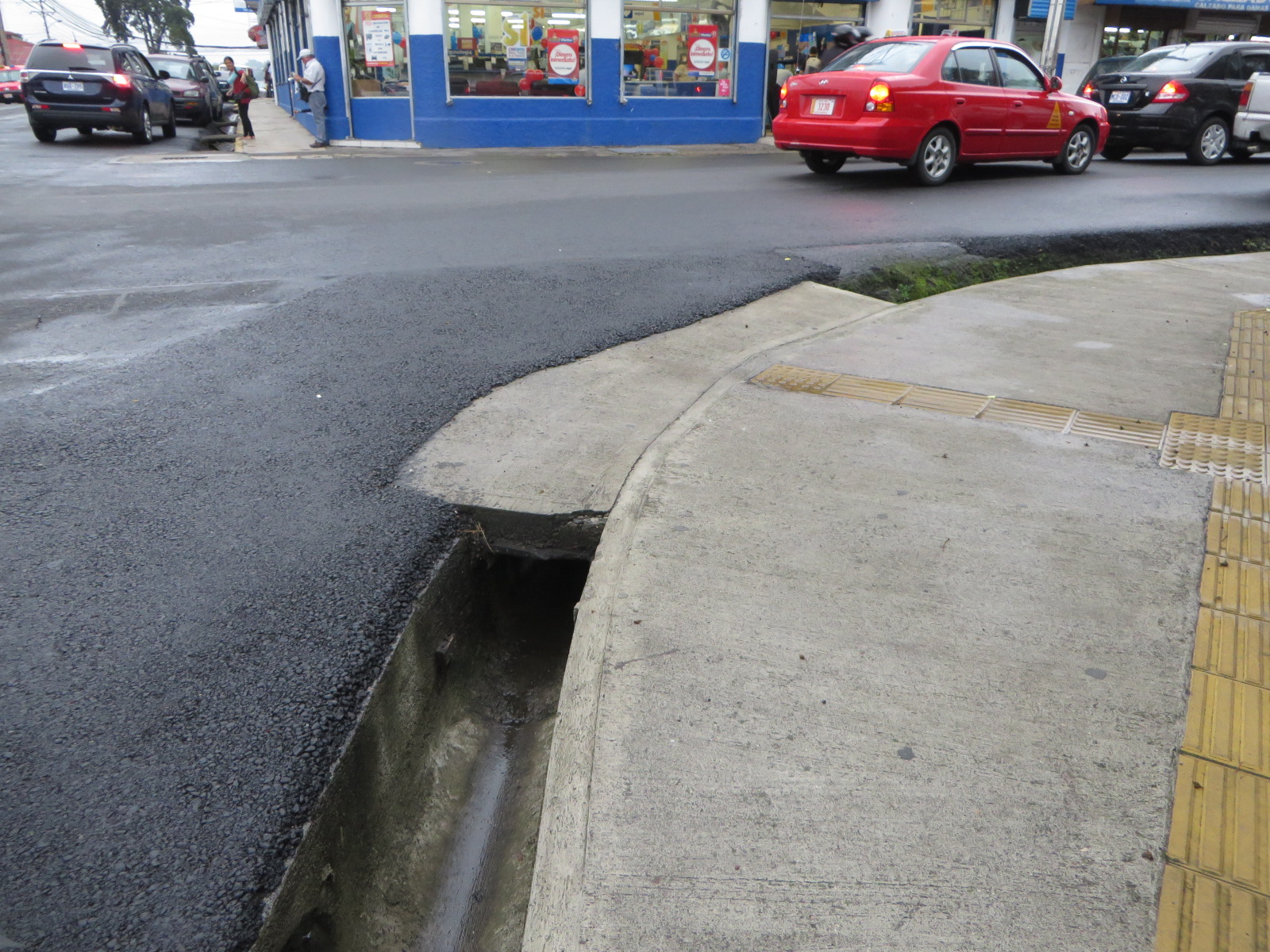
Street gutter, with pedestrian gutter bridge for crossing, in Costa Rica

A street gutter is a depression that runs parallel to a road and is designed to collect rainwater that flows along the street diverting it into a storm drain. A gutter alleviates water buildup on a street, allows pedestrians to pass without walking through puddles, and reduces the risk of hydroplaning by road vehicles. When a curbstone is present, a gutter may be formed by the convergence of the road surface and the vertical face of the sidewalk; otherwise, a dedicated gutter surface made of concrete may be present. Depending on local regulations, a gutter usually discharges, as a nonpoint pollution source in a storm drain whose final discharge falls into a detention pond (in order to remove some pollutants by sedimentation) or into a body of water. Street gutters are most often found in areas of a city which have high pedestrian traffic. In rural areas, gutters are seldom used and are frequently replaced by a borrow ditch.

When urban streets do not have sanitary sewers, street gutters are made deep enough to serve that purpose as well; responsibility for operation and maintenance of the dual-purpose street gutter was cooperatively shared between the local government and the inhabitants.

A now obsolete word meaning a street gutter is a kennel.

== Maintenance and Drainage Efficiency ==
Today, modern street gutters require precise engineering to make it work - typically maintaining a longitudinal slope of at least a 0.5% to prevent both standing water or mosquito breeding. In most urban areas, municipal maintenance programs mostly rely heavily on scheduled street sweepers to clear accumulated road debris which includes leaves and sediment. If these gutters and associated catch basins aren't regularly cleared by these workers, blockages can quickly lead to localized street flooding during heavy downpours.

== See also ==
- Road debris
- Street sweeper
- Pervious concrete
