= Trench drain =

Type of floor drain

A trench drain (also known as a channel drain, line drain, slot drain, linear drain, or strip drain) is a specific type of floor drain featuring a trough- or channel-shaped body. It is designed for the rapid evacuation of surface water or for the containment of utility lines or chemical spills. Employing a solid cover or grating that is flush with the surrounding surface, this drain is commonly made of concrete in-situ and with the option of using polymer- or metal-based liners or a channel former to aid in channel crafting and slope formation. The drain is characterized by its long length and narrow width, the cross-section of the drain is a function of the maximum flow volume anticipated from the surrounding surface. Channels can range from 1 inch (2.5 cm) to 2 feet (61 cm) in width, while depths can reach up to 4 feet (120 cm).

Trench drains are commonly confused with French drains, which consist of a perforated pipe that is buried in a gravel bed, and which are used to evacuate ground water. A slot drain, also wrongly associated with a trench drain, consists of a drainage pipe with a thin neck (or slot) that opens at the ground surface with sufficient opening to drain storm water.

== Types ==
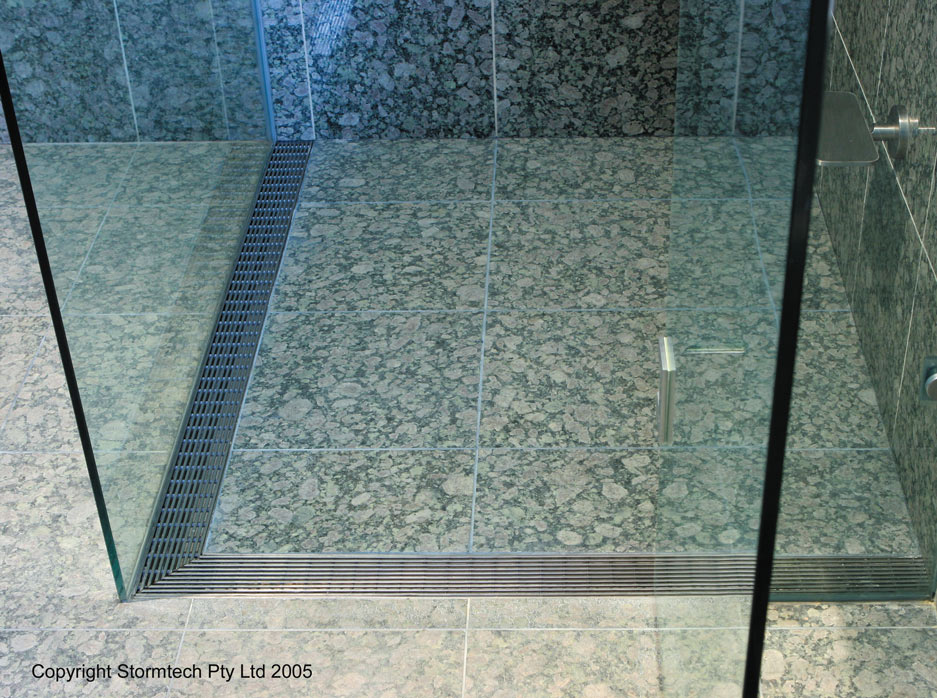
A linear drain

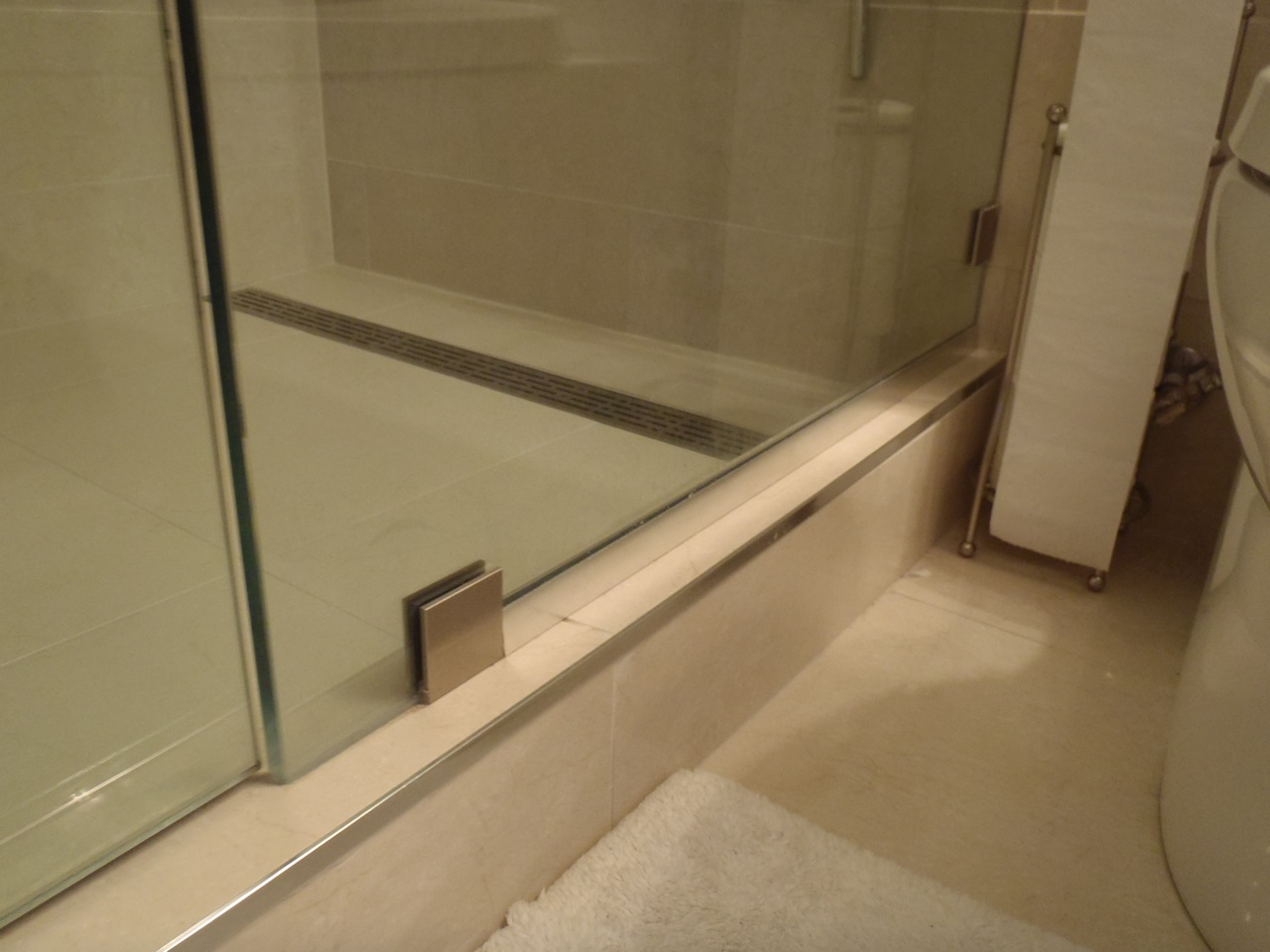
A Channel Drain

There are four common types of trench drains which are based on forming or installation method. These are cast-in-place, pre-cast concrete, liner systems and former systems. Newer stainless steel drains are available for residential and commercial shower installs and more commonly called "channel drains".

=== Cast in place ===
This is the original standard for trench drain systems. Here, a concrete trench is formed in the ground using wood forms, reinforcing bar and manual labor. It involves several steps:

1. Building a wooden mold that will ultimately form the channel for the trench drain;
2. Attaching a set of metal frames to the top edge of the form (which will hold the trench grating);
3. Suspending the form inside the trough (and flush with the surface elevation), such that there is space (6 inches (150 mm) or more) below and to each side of the form;
4. Attaching the drainage pipes to the suspended form;
5. Filling the trench with concrete (surrounding the form base and sides) and finishing the concrete flush with the metal frame;
6. And after drying, removing the wooden form, cleaning the pipe inverts and placing the grates in the frame.

This installation method is by far the most labor-intensive. In addition, material cost is a function of the width of the grate used in the trench. There are three main reasons why this is labor-intensive: the outlet pipe position in the floor, the levelling of the trench grate in the floor, and integration of the waterproofing. If the outlet is not exactly in the centre, then the channel must be customized, increasing cost and time to construct. This can be overcome by the use of modular trench drain systems. These allow the drain pipe to be connected anywhere along the trench, giving the builder and plumber more freedom to place the services, reducing construction time and costs, particularly in high-rise situations where moving plumbing services can be nearly impossible. A curbless or hobless entrance for special needs access is more readily achieved with a modular system, as the levelling of the shower floor to the bathroom floor is inherently problematic with non-modular systems as they have no on-site adjustment.

Waterproofing is possibly the most critical aspect of the bathroom when integrating a channel/trench drain. There are two ways to approach the waterproofing issue. First is to develop a proprietary method where the waterproofing and trench drain are a kit. Second is to separate the waterproofing and trench drain. The first method has the benefit of an 'all-in-one' solution, but the downside is cost and limitation of the system in varying applications, i.e. limited generally to bathroom application. The second method is generally safest as the waterproofing is completed using established proven methods that most building contractors are familiar with. A second benefit is when the waterproofing is a separate item all methods of waterproofing (cementeous, bitumized, fibreglassed, paint-on, sweat-on, lead-lined, copper pan etc.) can be utilized. This will allow a modular system to be used in many applications such as pools, balconies, thresholds, pedestrian areas, public areas, essentially most wet areas where a waterproofing system is required, be it on ground or above (suspended slab). Stainless steel trench drains can also be installed in a home's shower and in commercial locations like hospital rooms, changing rooms and operating rooms.

=== Former systems ===
This installation method is the logical successor to the cast-in-place method. The former system gives a cast-in-place product without the hassle of making the form. Rather than wood, the forms are made of lightweight expanded polystyrene (EPS) or cardboard. The forms attach to a prefabricated frame and grate system that can then be easily set in the trough and aligned for the pouring of concrete. And, like the cast-in-place method, the form is removed after the concrete has dried. The real savings with the former method is in time required for making and setting the form. The efficiency of the former system helps speed up the installation thus reducing labor costs. One downside to the former system is the waste generated by the disposal of the EPS and cardboard.

=== Pre-cast concrete ===
Pre-cast trench drains are made in a factory that specializes in making concrete shapes. The channel pieces range in width and length, larger channels requiring heavy equipment to move them, however most channels can be picked up and moved easily by hand. The channels are formed in large metal forms that (usually) have a pre-determined channel width, depth, and slope. Like in the cast-in-place method, a metal frame is attached to the form and concrete is poured and finished in a factory atmosphere. The advantage to the pre-cast trench drain is again time savings—big time savings at the job site. Pre-cast trench drains made of a polymer concrete are also more sturdy and reliable than cast-in-place trenches. Once a trough is dug, the pre-cast trench sections can be installed and quickly be put into service through numerous methods. A patty method can be used by placing clumps of concrete at each trench drain channel joint and the channels can be levelled and set as such. Further installation methods involve clipping rebar through installation device used with the channel. Concrete will need to be poured to surround the trench drain so that the load can be transferred from the channel and grate to the surrounding areas.

Pre-cast trench drains generally come in 4-inch (100 mm) widths but can range anywhere from a 1.75-inch (44 mm) slot to 2-inch (51 mm) wide channels with grates, and up to any size imaginable through custom trench drain divisions. A home owner could consider a pre-cast trench for a landscaping project as there are many pre-cast trench drain systems being manufactured specifically for the residential market. A person generally can go to a pre-caster or a distributor and buy 50 feet (15 m) of trench drain; the cost of the material to create the trench drains can be more expensive than simply using cast-in-place systems, however the money saved through installation, maintenance, and longevity heavily outweighs those costs.

=== Linear systems ===
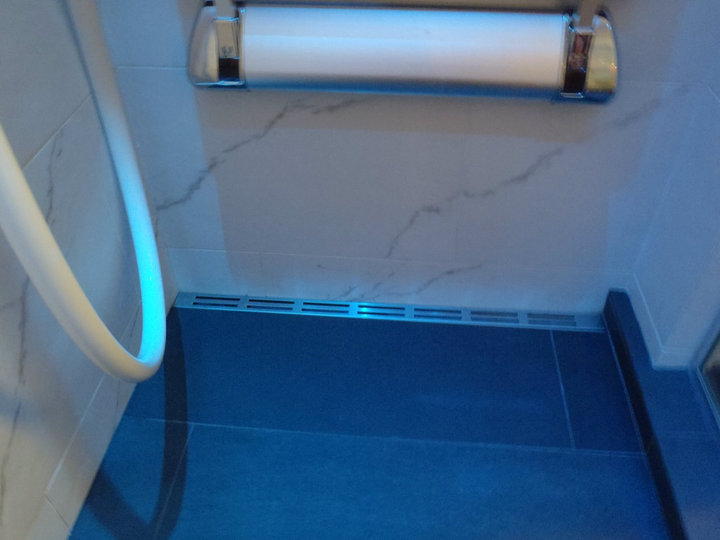
A channel drain in a Vancouver condo

The popular trend in trench drains are linear systems. Linear as in line drain. Made from materials such as polymer concrete, fiberglass, structural plastic and steel, liner systems are the channel and grate components that are assembled in the trench and around which concrete is poured to form a drain system. By themselves, these liner systems do not have the strength and integrity to hold up under the physical requirements needed for the drain. A concrete (or asphalt) drain body is required to encase the channel to give the channel compressive strength and rigidity to ensure the drain will be able to withstand the traffic load it was designed to handle.

== Construction ==
=== Airports ===
The use of trench drains in construction began with the commission by the British Airports Authority of a company called Gatic. Airports were in need of a form of trench drainage with fewer movable parts and less tendency to collapse under heavy traffic, compared to traditional drainage gratings. Gatic designed and engineered the first stainless steel slot drain, and it was installed first at Stansted Airport in the United Kingdom, following which it was specified at Britain's most famous airport – Heathrow. These airports continue to use stainless steel slot drainage both airside and landside for surface water drainage requirements.

=== Industrial, development, and urban landscapes ===
Following the use of slot drainage at airports, the manufacturers began engineering slot drainage for other types of construction project, including ports, docks, industrial areas, motorways, roads, car parks and urban developments. Differing sizes and load ratings variations of the original slot drain product now exist, manufactured by Gatic and a handful of other manufacturers, most notably Halfords and Aco technologies.

=== Standards ===
The American Society of Mechanical Engineers (ASME) publishes the following Standard:

- ASME A112.6.3 on Floor and Trench Drains
