= AAA Foundation for Traffic Safety =

Nonprofit organization in Washington D.C., United States

The AAA Foundation for Traffic Safety (see also American Automobile Association - AAA) is a non-profit, charitable organization based in Washington, DC, that is dedicated to saving lives through traffic safety research and education. Since its founding in 1947, the AAA Foundation has sponsored over 200 projects related to highway safety, covering topics such as distracted, impaired, and drowsy driving; road rage; graduated driver licensing; driver's education and training; and pedestrian safety. The AAA Foundation research agenda is centered on four priority areas: Driver behavior and performance, emerging technologies, roadway systems and drivers and vulnerable road users.

Research in each of these areas is intended to identify the causes and consequences of motor vehicle crashes, evaluate possible countermeasures and solutions, and offer recommendations for achieving the overarching goal of preventing injuries and fatalities on the nation's highways.

Research findings are communicated to policymakers, safety partners, and the media, and are used to develop public educational materials, such as brochures, handbooks, videos, and computer games/software. These products are designed to help drivers understand the potential hazards they will face on the road - such as work zones, railroad crossings, and inclement weather - and hone the skills needed to manage these risks and arrive at their destinations safely.

The AAA Foundation is also recognized as a leader in promoting the idea of Traffic Safety Culture; that is, a social climate in which traffic safety is highly valued and rigorously pursued. Since 2008, the AAA Foundation has published its annual Traffic Safety Culture Index in an effort to benchmark and track key indicators of the public's beliefs and attitudes toward highway safety. Information is collected through a nationally representative Telephone survey that measures both attitudes and behaviors regarding, among other things, drinking and driving, cell phone use/texting behind the wheel, speeding, and seatbelt use.

AAA Foundation projects have also been used to help strengthen laws, build public awareness of safety concerns and trends, and advise transportation agencies and highway departments on roadway improvement needs. For example, a 2006 report, Safety Impacts of Pavement Edge Drop-offs, documented and analyzed the effects such drop-offs have on roadway departure crashes. The study was cited by the Federal Highway Administration's Office of Safety in its promotion of a cost-effective technology known as the Safety Edge, one of nine countermeasures FHWA considers proven to reduce motor vehicle crashes and improve safety.
