= Motorcycling =

Act of riding a motorcycle for transportation or recreation

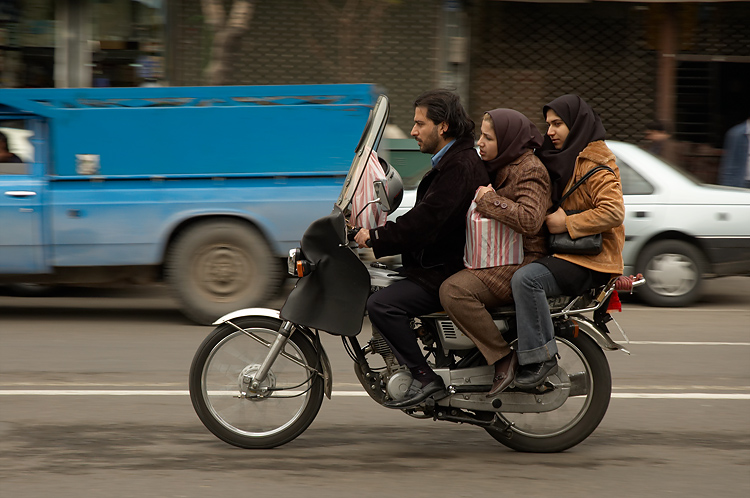
Three riders on a motorcycle in Tehran

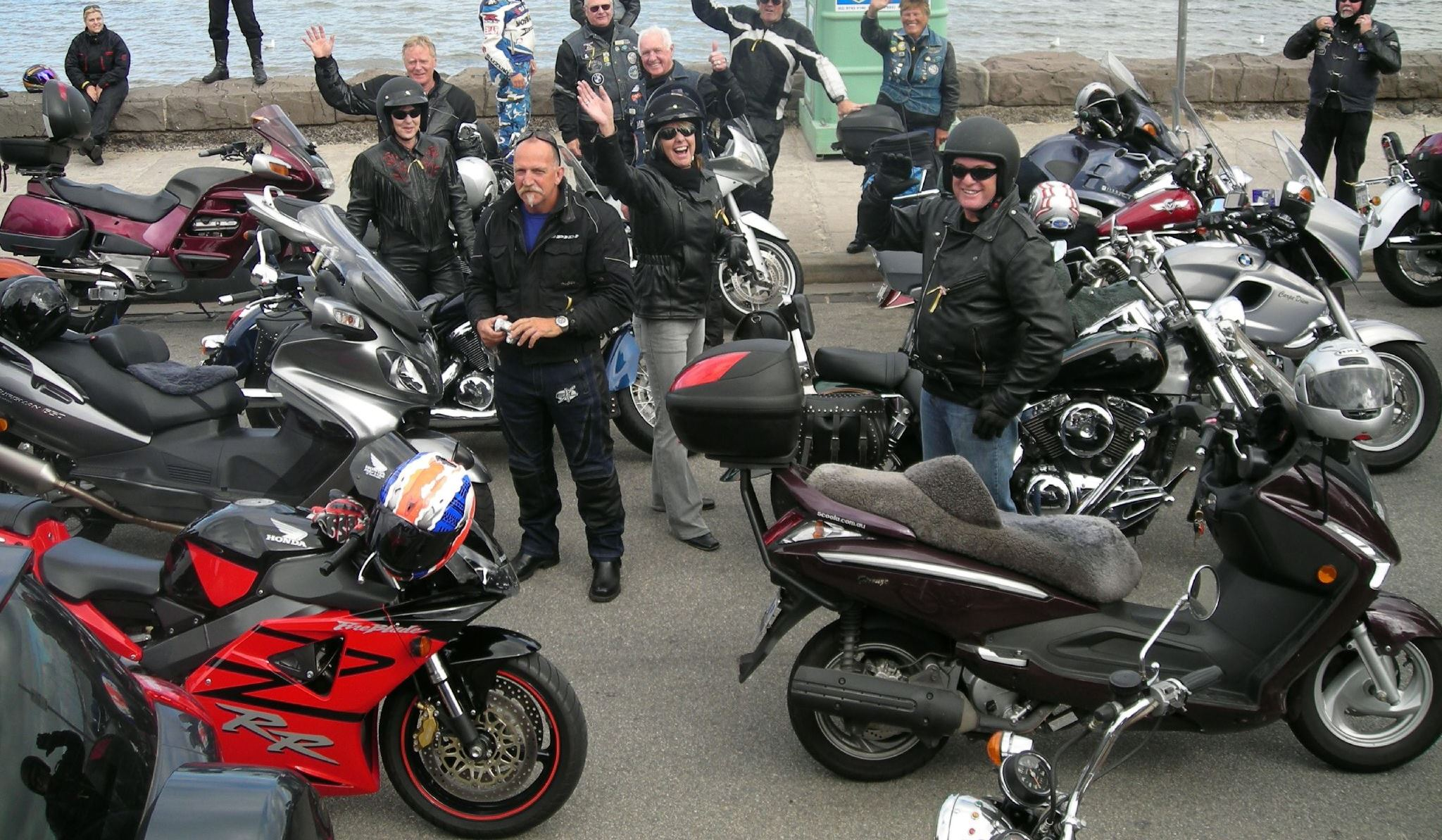
Motorcycle social activity

A video of a person riding a motorcycle

Motorcycling is the act of riding a motorcycle. For some people, motorcycling may be the only affordable form of individual motorized transportation, and small-displacement motorcycles are the most common motor vehicle in the most populous countries, including India, China and Indonesia.

In developing countries, motorcycles are overwhelmingly utilitarian due to lower prices and greater fuel economy. Of all motorcycles, 58% are in the Asia Pacific and Southern and Eastern Asia regions, excluding car-centric Japan.

Motorcycles are mainly a luxury good in developed nations, where they are used mostly for recreation, as a lifestyle accessory or a symbol of personal identity. Beyond being a mode of motor transportation or sport, motorcycling has become a subculture and lifestyle. Although mainly a solo activity, motorcycling can be social and motorcyclists tend to have a sense of community with each other.

== Reasons for riding a motorcycle ==
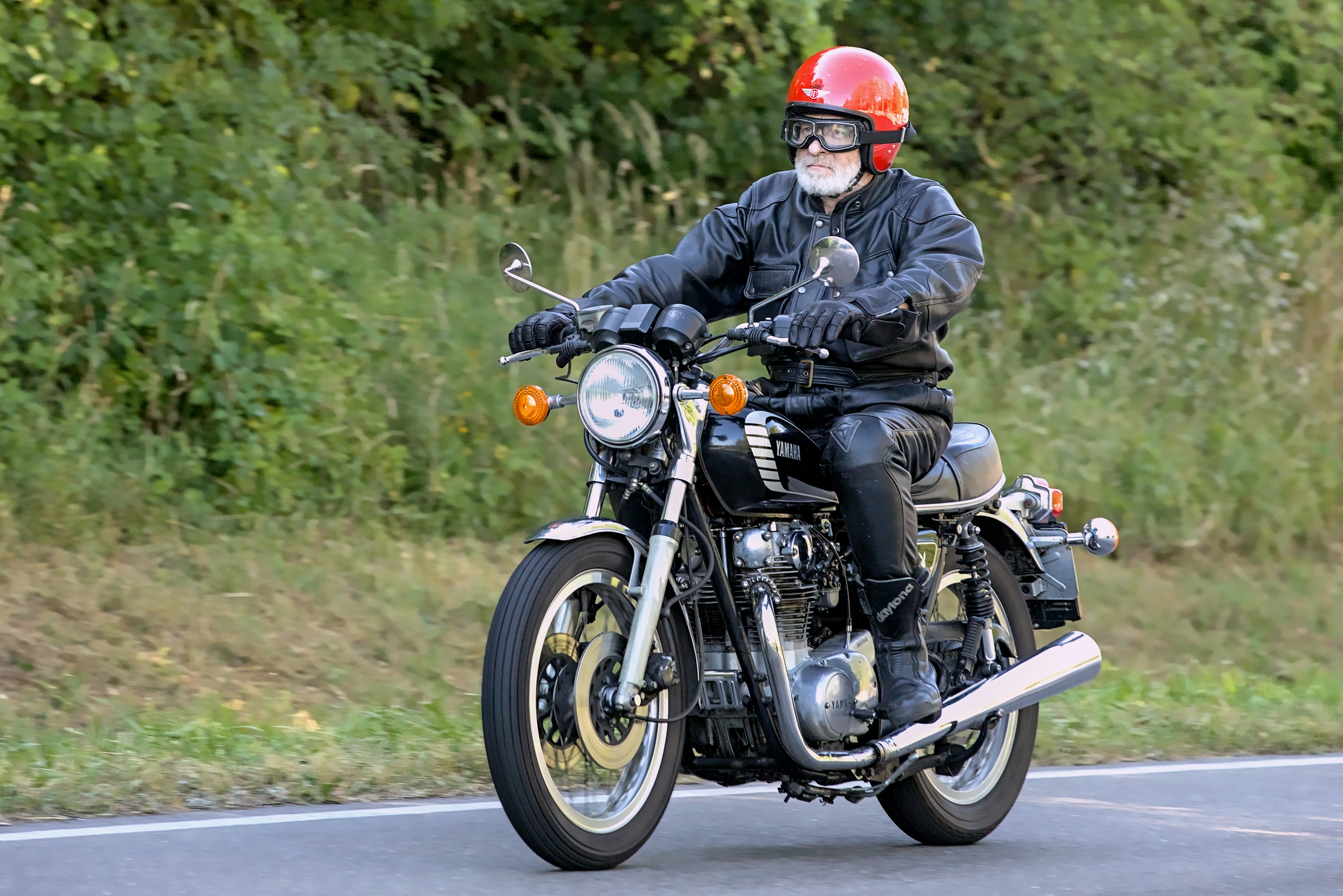
A motorcyclist

For most riders, a motorcycle is a cheaper and more convenient form of transportation which causes less commuter congestion within cities and has less environmental impact than automobile ownership. Others ride as a way to relieve stress and to "clear their minds" as described in Robert M. Pirsig's book Zen and the Art of Motorcycle Maintenance. Pirsig contrasted the sense of connection experienced by motorcyclists with the isolation of drivers who are "always in a compartment", passively observing the passing landscape. Pirsig portrayed motorcycling as being in "completely in contact with it all... in the scene."

The connection to one's motorcycle is sensed further, as Pirsig explained, by the frequent need to maintain its mechanical operation. Pirsig felt that connection deepen when faced with a difficult mechanical problem that required walking away from it until the solution became clear. Similarly, motorcyclists experience pleasure at the feeling of being far more connected to their motor vehicles than in a motorcar, as being part of it rather than in it.

=== Speed appeal ===
Speed draws many people to motorcycling because the power-to-weight ratio of even a low-power motorcycle is in league with that of an expensive sports car. The power-to-weight ratio of many modestly priced sport bikes is well beyond any mass-market automobile and rivals that of supercars for a fraction of the price. The fastest accelerating production cars, capable of 0 to 60 mph (0 to 97 km/h) in under 3.5 seconds, or 0 to 1/4 mile (0.0 to 0.4 km) in under 12 seconds is a relatively select club of exotic names like Porsche and Lamborghini, with a few extreme sub-models of popular sports cars, like the Shelby Mustang, and mostly made since the 1990s. Conversely, the fastest accelerating motorcycles meeting the same criteria is a much longer list and includes many non-sportbikes, such as the Triumph Tiger Explorer or Yamaha XT1200Z Super Ténéré, and includes many motorcycles dating back to the 1970s.

Hunter S. Thompson's book Hell's Angels includes an ode to the joys of pushing a motorcycle to its limits, "with the throttle screwed on there is only the barest margin, and no room at all for mistakes ... that's when the strange music starts ... fear becomes exhilaration [and the] only sounds are the wind and a dull roar floating back from the mufflers" and T. E. Lawrence wrote of the "lustfulness of moving swiftly" and the "pleasure of speeding on the road". A sensation he compared to feeling "the earth moulding herself under me ... coming alive ... and heaving and tossing on each side like a sea."

In The Perfect Vehicle, Melissa Holbrook Pierson wrote "a love of speed for its own sake, the need for constant movement, and the desire to be different, or at least to be seen that way" were "prerequisites" for becoming a motorcyclist.

=== Benefits when commuting ===
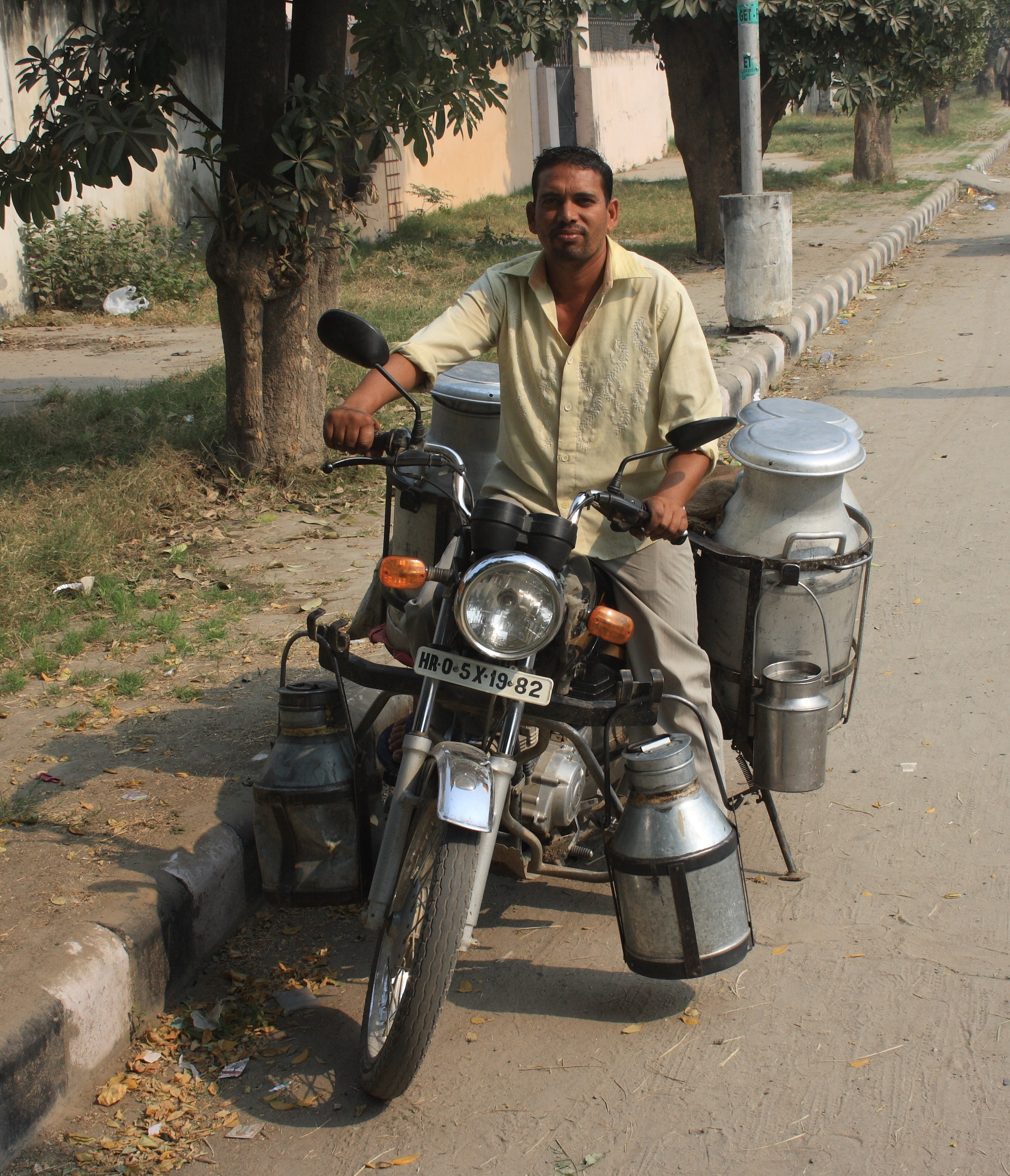
Milk delivery in Karnal, India

While people choose to ride motorcycles for various reasons, those reasons are increasingly practical, with riders opting for a powered two-wheeler as a cost-efficient alternative to infrequent and expensive public transport systems, or as a means of avoiding or reducing the effects of urban congestion.

Where permitted, lane splitting, which is also known as filtering, allows motorcycles to move between vehicles in slow or stationary traffic.

In the UK, motorcycles are exempt from the London congestion charge that other vehicles must pay to enter the city during the day. Motorcycles are also exempt from toll charges at such river crossings as the Dartford Crossing, and Mersey Tunnels. Such cities as Bristol provide dedicated free parking and allow motorcycles to use bus lanes. In the United States, motorcycles may use high-occupancy vehicle lanes in accordance with federal law and pay a lesser fee on some toll roads and toll bridges. Other countries have similar policies.

In New Zealand, motorcycle riders need not pay for parking that is controlled by a barrier arm; the arm occupies less than the entire width of the lane, and the motorcyclist simply rides around it. Many car parks that are thus controlled so supply special areas for motorcycles to park as to save space.

In many cities that have serious parking challenges for cars, such as Melbourne, Australia, motorcycles are generally permitted to park on the sidewalk, rather than occupy a space on the street which might otherwise be used by a car. Melbourne presents an example for the rest of the world with its free motorcycle footpath parking which is enshrined in their Future Melbourne Committee Road Safety Plan

On Washington State Ferries, the most-used vehicle ferry system in the United States, motorcycle riders get priority boarding, skip automobile waiting lines, and are charged a lower fare than automobiles. BC Ferries users obtain many of the same benefits.

== Demographics ==
Statistically, there is a large difference between the car-dominated developed nations, and the more populous developing countries where cars are less common than motorcycles. In developed nations, motorcycles are frequently owned in addition to a car, and thus used primarily for recreation or when traffic density means a motorcycle confers travel time or parking advantages as a mode of transport.

In the developing world a motorcycle is more likely to be the primary mode of transport for its owner, and often the owner's family as well. It is not uncommon for riders to transport multiple passengers or large goods aboard small motorcycles and scooters simply because there is no better alternative. Cost of ownership considerations regarding maintenance and parts, especially in remote areas, often place cars out of reach of families who consider motorbikes relatively affordable. The simplicity demanded of motorcycles used in the developing world, coupled with the high volume of sales possible makes them a profitable and appealing product for major manufacturers, who go to substantial lengths to attract and retain market share.

=== Propagation ===
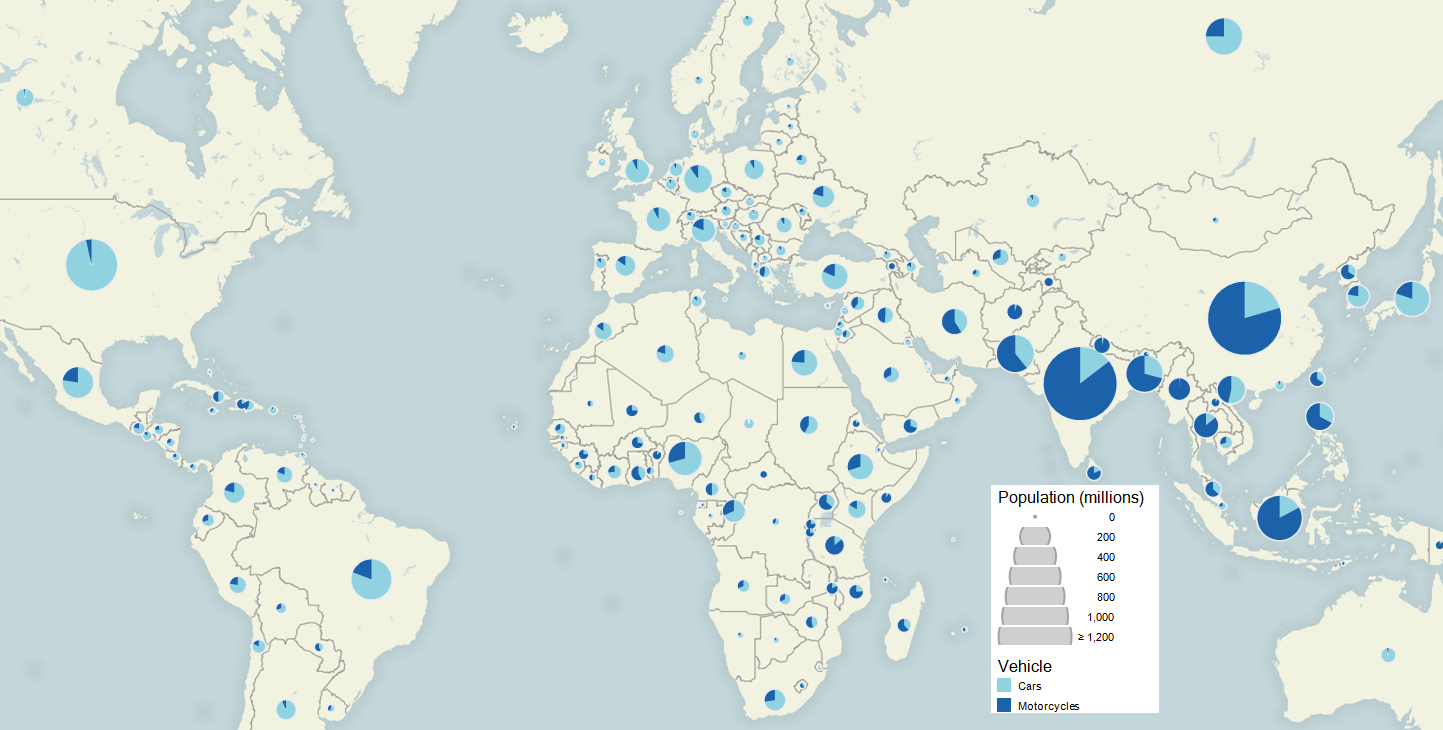
Number of motorcycles vs number of cars by country. Size of pie indicates population – 2002 estimates.

Motorbikes are one of the most affordable forms of motorised transport and, for most of the world's population, they are the most familiar type of motor vehicle. While North America, Europe and Japan are car-centric cultures where motorcycles are uncommon, the non-car-centric cultures of India, China and Southeast Asia account for more than half of the world's population, and in those places two-wheelers outnumber four wheeled vehicles.

Over 700 million motorcycles, including mopeds, motor scooters, motorised bicycles, and other powered two and three-wheelers, are in use worldwide, or about 100 motorcycles per 1000 people. By comparison, there are about 1 billion cars in the world, or about 141 per 1000 people, with about one third in service in Japan and the United States.

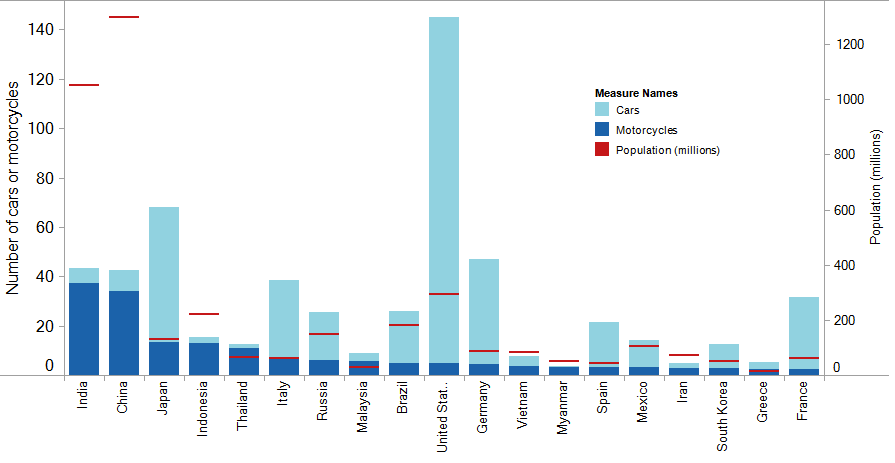
Millions of cars (light blue) and motorcycles (dark blue) in the top 20 countries with the most motorcycles. Population in red. 2002 estimates.

The four largest motorcycle markets in the world are all in Asia: China, India, Indonesia, and Vietnam. India, with an estimated 37 million motorcycles/mopeds, was home to the largest number of motorised two wheelers in the world. China came a close second with 34 million motorcycles/mopeds in 2002. As the middle class in India, China, and other developing countries grows, they are repeating the transition from motorcycles to cars that took place in the US in the years after World War I, and in Europe following World War II, and the role of motorcycling is changing from a transport necessity to a leisure activity, and the motorcycle is changing from a family's primary motor vehicle to a second or third vehicle. The motorcycle is also popular in Brazil's frontier towns.

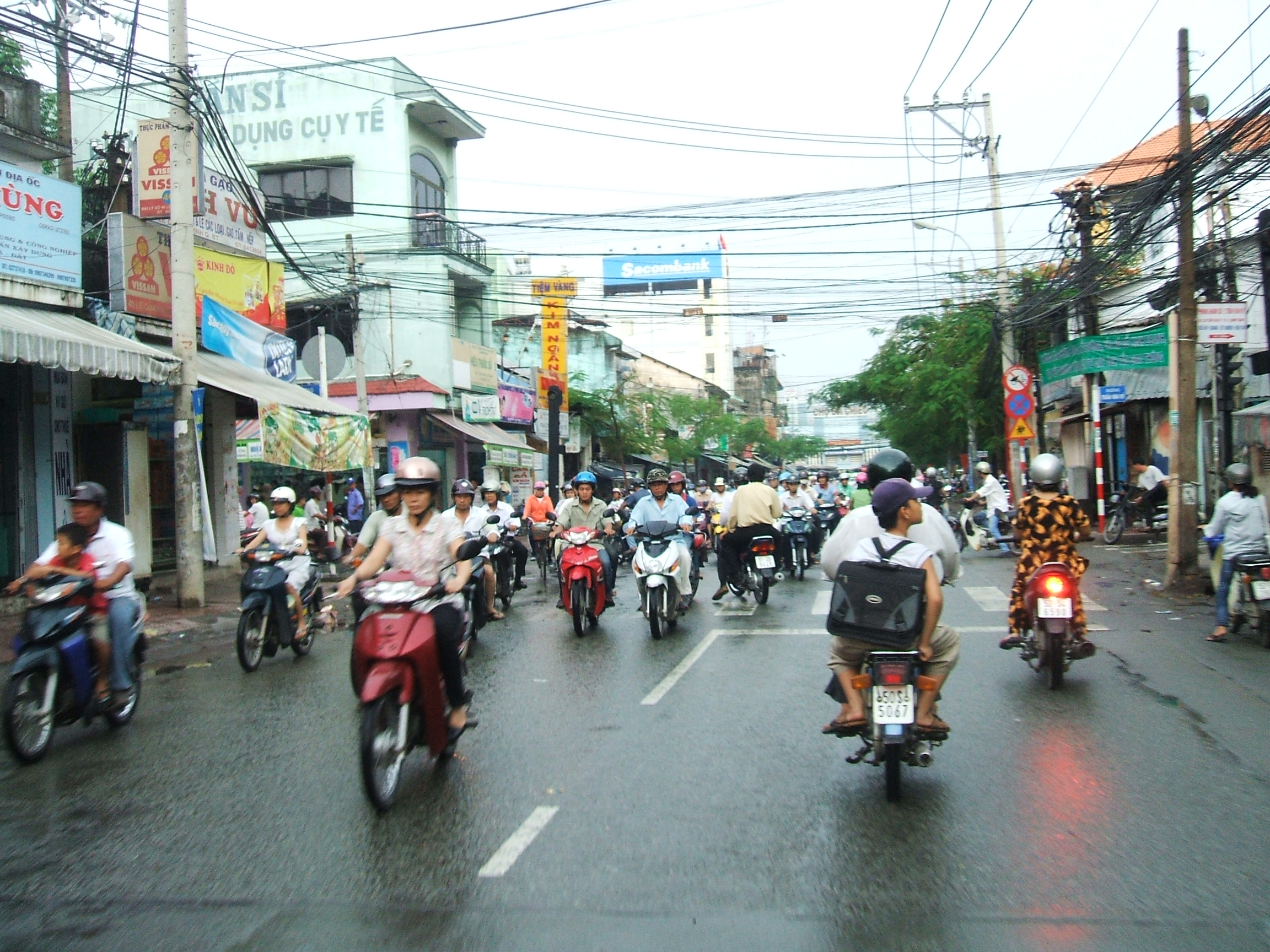
Motorbikes are the primary form of transportation in Vietnam.

In numerous cultures, motorcycles are the primary means of motorised transport. According to the Taiwanese government, for example, "the number of automobiles per ten thousand population is around 2,500, and the number of motorcycles is about 5,000." In places such as Vietnam, motorised traffic consist of mostly motorbikes due to a lack of public transport and low income levels that put automobiles out of reach for many.

==== Changes in propagation ====
Recent years have seen an increase in the popularity of motorcycles elsewhere. In the US, registrations increased by 51% between 2000 and 2005. This is mainly attributed to increasing fuel prices and urban congestion.

During the 2008 financial crisis, the motorcycle market grew by 6.5%.

In China, the number of motorcycles in use increased from 34 million in 2002 to 54 million in 2006, with annual production of 22 million units.

=== Usage in the developed world ===
A Consumer Reports subscribers' survey of mainly United States motorcycle and scooter owners reported that they rode an average of only 1,000 miles (1,600 km) per year, 82% for recreation and 38% for commuting, adding to more than 100% because some riders rode for both recreation and commuting. Americans put 10,000–12,000 miles (16,000–19,000 km) per year on their cars and light trucks. As motorcyclists in mainly Western countries age, there is a tendency for riders to choose touring bikes over sports bikes. The motorcycle is also popular with police departments with departments starting to make the switch to electric motorcycles.

== Safety ==
The relative risk of a motorcycle rider being killed or seriously injured per kilometre travelled was around 54 times higher in Great Britain in 2006 than for car drivers. United States Department of Transportation data for 2005 from the Fatality Analysis Reporting System show that for passenger cars, 18.62 fatal crashes occur per 100,000 registered vehicles. For motorcycles this figure is 75.19 per 100,000 registered vehicles — four times higher than for cars. The same data shows that 1.56 fatalities occur per 100 million vehicle miles travelled for passenger cars, whereas for motorcycles the figure is 43.47, which was 37 times higher than for cars in 2007. The increased risk over other road users comes from the motorcyclist being relatively unprotected on the motorcycle.

There are also some statistics comparing the risk of hospital admissions for different leisure activities. A study shows that the probability for the activity leading to hospital admission was 4.9/10,000 hours of horseback riding, while the same number for motorcycling was 1.4/10,000 hours.

To address motorcycle safety issues, motorcycle-specific training and personal protective equipment is important for motorcyclists' survival on the road, and mandated in many countries and several U.S. states and counties.

=== Causes for motorcycle accidents ===
A Norwegian study has looked at the reasons behind motorcycle death accidents. The study has looked at all fatal accidents in Norway (a total of 153) in the time frame 2005 to 2009. In 66% of these accidents, the motorcyclist was to blame for the accident occurring, while others were to blame in 20% of the cases. Technical problems with the motorcycle itself are rarely the cause of crashes, as this was shown to be a prominent factor in only 4% of the investigated accidents.

Racing and supersport motorcycles, even while having the best handling capabilities, are overrepresented in fatal accidents. Adventurous people are drawn to these bikes, and this group are more prone to be involved in crashes. More fatal accidents on racing motorcycles are caused by extreme behaviour than on touring motorcycles.

=== Helmet usage ===
In Europe, head injuries lead to death in about 75% of fatal motorcycle accidents. The same number for low- and middle-income countries is 88%. Helmet usage reduces the chance for death in an accident by 40% and the risk of serious injury by 70%.

While helmet usage generally is increasing worldwide and 77% of the world's population is covered by extensive helmet laws, many countries still lack sufficient enforcement. Pakistan has both laws requiring driver and passenger to wear a helmet and regulations on helmet standards. Still, only 10% of all riders in Pakistan wear a helmet.

== Subcultures ==
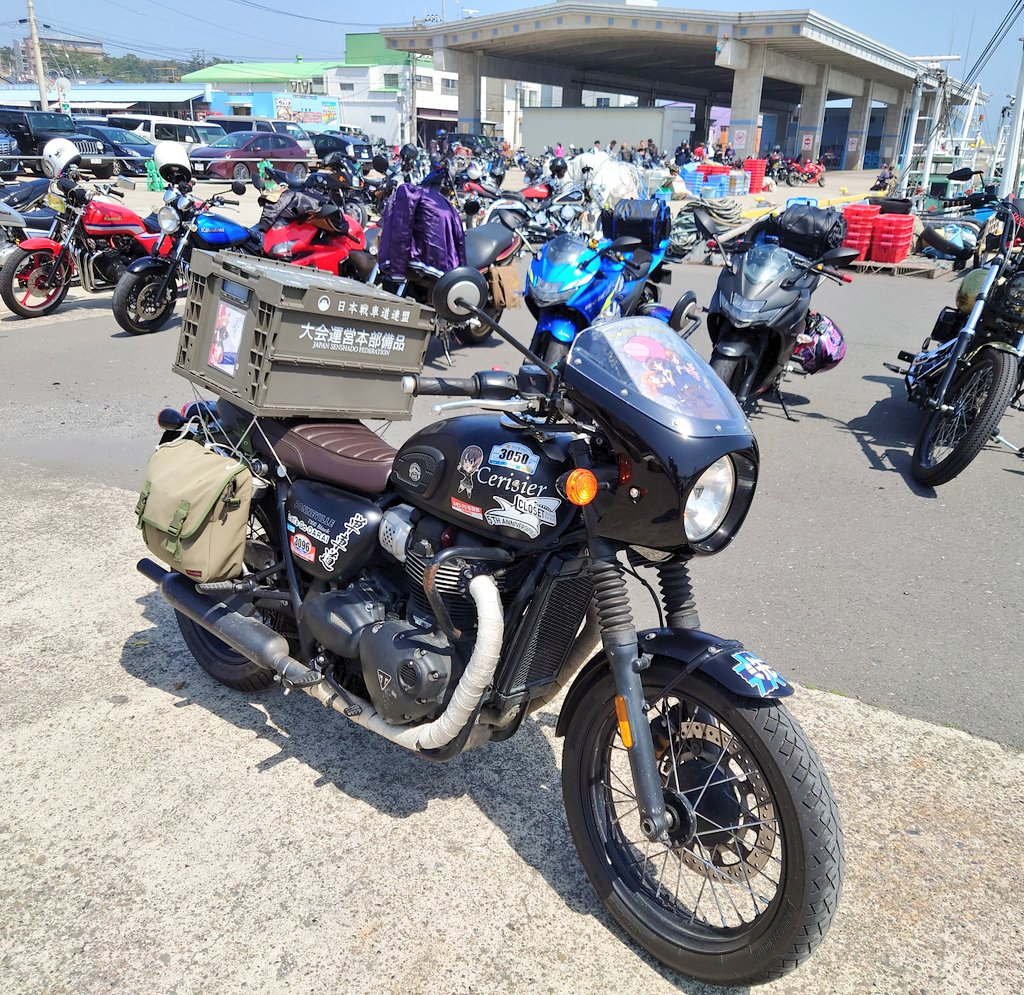
Motorcycles gather in Ōarai, Ibaraki Prefecture, Japan

Motorcycling lifestyles have been adopted by many different groups spanning nations and cultures. They include commuters, mainstream motorcycle clubs such as long-distance riding clubs, adventure touring, trail riding and those involved with motorcycle sports, such as motocross riding, drag racing, circuit racing and trick or stunt enthusiasts; and those involved in customizing their vehicles in various different styles. Organized rides are a key element of many groups.

Around the world, motorcycles have historically been associated with highly visible subcultures. Some of these subcultures have been loose-knit social groups, such as the scooter riders and cafe racer riders of the 1950s and 60s in Great Britain, and they often are seen as inhabiting the fringes of society. Numerous books about motorcycle subcultures have been written, including Hunter S. Thompson's Hells Angels, Lee Gutkind's Bike Fever, and Daniel R. Wolf's The Rebels.

== Clubs, lobbying groups, and outlaw gangs ==
=== Motorcycle clubs ===
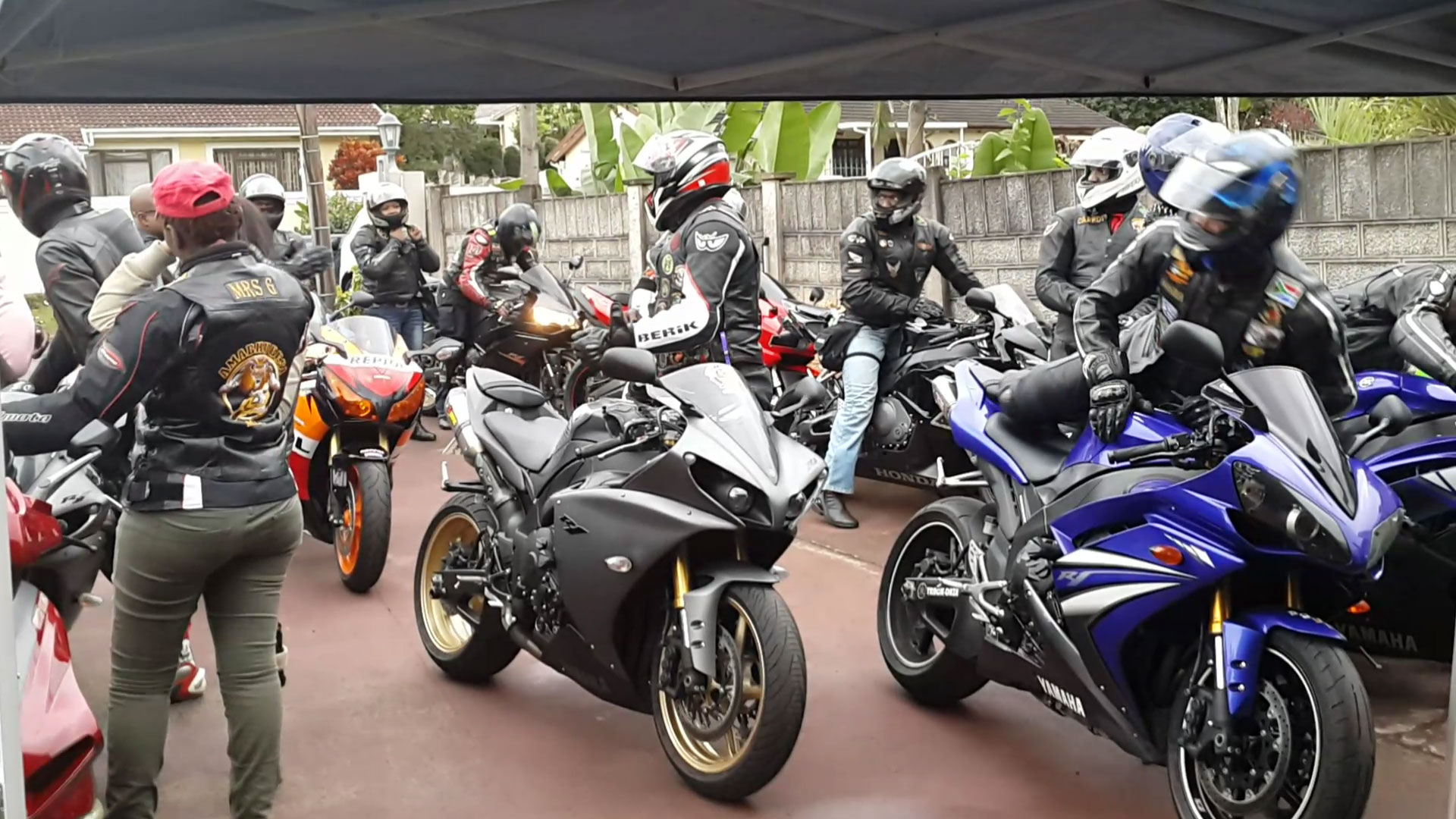
A motorcycle club in Durban, South Africa

Social motorcyclist organisations are popular and are sometimes organised geographically, focus on individual makes, or even specific models. Example motorcycle clubs include American Motorcyclist Association, Harley Owners Group and BMW MOA. Some organisations hold large international motorcycle rallies in different parts of the world that are attended by many thousands of riders. Many social motorcycle organisations raise money for charities as a secondary activity, through organised events and rides, and others exist primarily as social benefit organisations, such as Bikers Against Child Abuse.

=== Advanced riding clubs ===
In the UK, advanced riding clubs exist in the Institute of Advanced Motorists and RoSPA Advanced Drivers and Riders. They provide a network of clubs around the United Kingdom that provides advanced skills training, preparation for taking an advanced driving test and social activities.

=== Lobbying ===
Since the late 20th century, motorcyclists have formed political lobbying organisations in order to influence legislators to introduce motorcycle-friendly legislation and to contribute more broadly to public discourse where motorcycles are concerned.

One of the oldest such organisations, the British Motorcycle Action Group, was founded in 1973 specifically in response to helmet compulsion, introduced without public consultation. In addition, the British Motorcyclists Federation (BMF), founded in 1960 as a reaction to the public perception of motorcyclists as leather-jacketed hooligans, has itself moved into political lobbying. Likewise, the U.S. has ABATE, which, like most such organisations, also works to improve motorcycle safety, as well as running the usual charity fund-raising events and rallies, often for motorcycle-related political interests.

=== Outlaw gangs ===
At the other end of the spectrum from the charitable organisations and the motorcycle rights activists are the "outlaw motorcycle gangs". One definition, by the Provincial Court of Manitoba, is: "Any group of motorcycle enthusiasts who have voluntarily made a commitment to band together and abide by their organisations' rigorous rules enforced by violence, who engage in activities that bring them and their club into serious conflict with society and the law." The Federal Bureau of Investigation (FBI) and Criminal Intelligence Service Canada have designated four MCs as Outlaw Motorcycle Gangs (OMGs), which are the Pagans, Hells Angels, Outlaws MC, and Bandidos, known as the "Big Four".

The motorcycle manufacturing industry and many government entities around the world have taken actions to clean up the reputation and activities of motorcyclists.

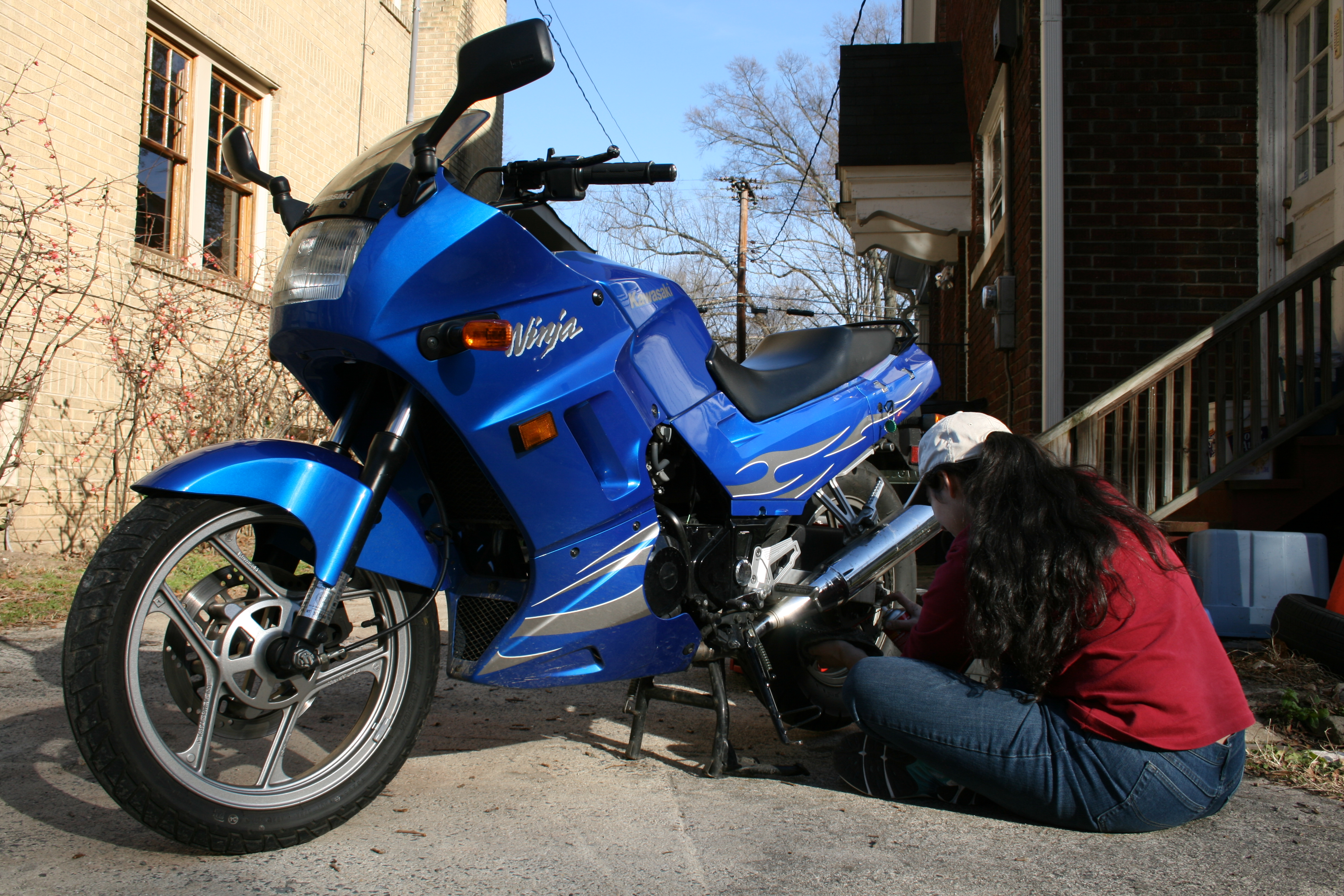
Maintenance on a Kawasaki Ninja 250 motorcycle

== Maintenance ==
Motorcyclists will refer to maintenance or repair of a motorcycle as wrenching in the US and "spannering" in the UK. A do it yourself self-sufficiency is said to be part of motorcycles' allure in an "increasingly monolithic, unfixable world" and being able to maintain one's own motorcycle is seen as part of the competency of being a motorcyclist.

Historically, motorcycle maintenance was a necessary skill for riders, since the materials and technology used in motorcycles often meant that repairs had to be done on the road-side miles from home. Modern motorcycles are as reliable as automobiles but many riders feel that their motorcycle is more than just a means of transportation which leads them to want to do maintenance on the motorcycles themselves.
