= Motorcycle club =

Group of individuals whose primary interest and activities involve motorcycles

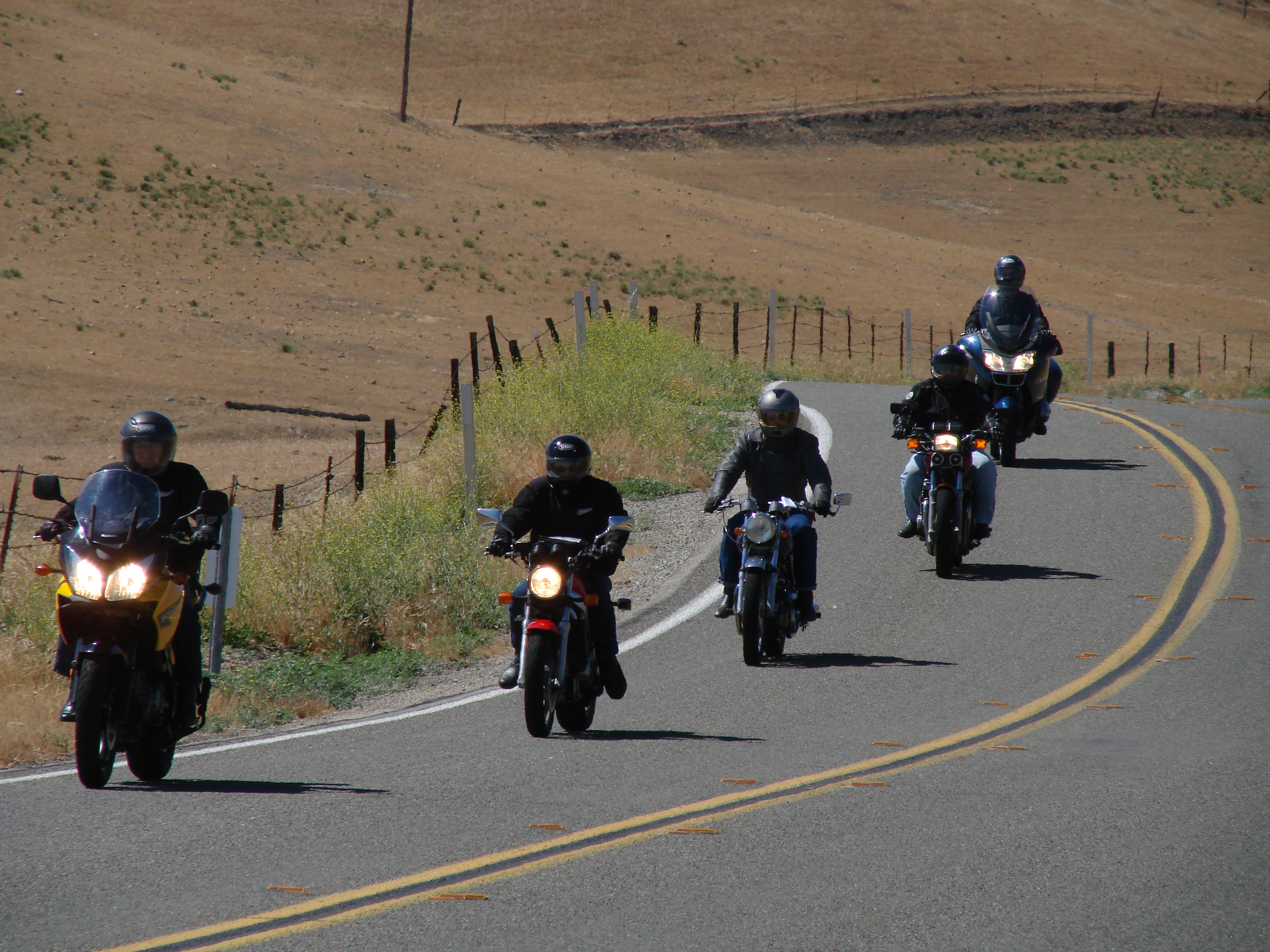
Southern California Norton Owner's Club on California State Route 41, near Creston.

A motorcycle club is a group of individuals whose primary interest and activities involve motorcycles. A motorcycle group can range as clubbed groups of different bikes or bikers who own same model of vehicle like the Harley Owners Group.

There are a great many brand clubs, i.e. clubs dedicated to a particular marque, including those sponsored by various manufacturers, modeled on the original brand club, the Harley Owners Group. There are also large national independent motorcycle clubs, for example, the BMW Motorcycle Owners of America, and the Dominar Owners Club (DOC), an exclusive motorcycle group for Bajaj Dominar bikes only. There are also specific clubs for women, such as the Women's International Motorcycle Association, and clubs for lesbians and gays, such as Dykes on Bikes.

Clubs catering for those interested in vintage machines such as the Vintage Motor Cycle Club are also popular as well as those centered on particular venues. Clubs catering for riders' rights such as the Motorcycle Action Group, and charities like The Royal British Legion Riders Branch and the Armed Forces Bikers Veterans Charity are also popular. Many affiliate with an umbrella organization, such as the British Motorcyclists Federation in the UK, or FEMA in Europe. Producing national and local branch club magazines and events are typical activities of such clubs.

Other organizations whose activities primarily involve motorcycles exist for specific purposes or social causes such as the Patriot Guard Riders, who provide funeral escorts for military veterans, and Rolling Thunder, which advocates for troops missing in action and prisoners of war. While neither of the latter two groups require a motorcycle for membership, they are motorcycling-oriented and much of their activity involves rides.

There are numerous religiously oriented clubs such as the Christian Motorcyclists Association, a biker ministry, charities such as Freewheelers EVS, which use motorcycles to provide an out-of-hours emergency medical courier service, and clubs which attract membership from specific groups, such as the Blue Knights Law Enforcement Motorcycle Club, for law enforcement personnel.

In the United Kingdom, two charities (the Institute of Advanced Motorists and RoSPA Advanced Drivers and Riders) have significant-sized motorcycle clubs with trained volunteers to promote roadcraft and help riders pass an advanced driving test.

== History ==
One of the first motorcycle clubs was the New York Motorcycle Club, which in 1903 merged with the Alpha Motorcycle Club of Brooklyn to become the Federation of American Motorcyclists. Later, the Motorcycle and Allied Trades Association (M&ATA) formed a Rider Division which spun off into the American Motorcyclist Association.

== American Motorcyclist Association ==
The American Motorcyclist Association (AMA) is the largest American motorcyclist organization. It serves as an umbrella organization for local clubs and sporting events. As of 2015, the AMA had over 200,000 members and over 1,200 chartered clubs.

== MCs and MCCs ==
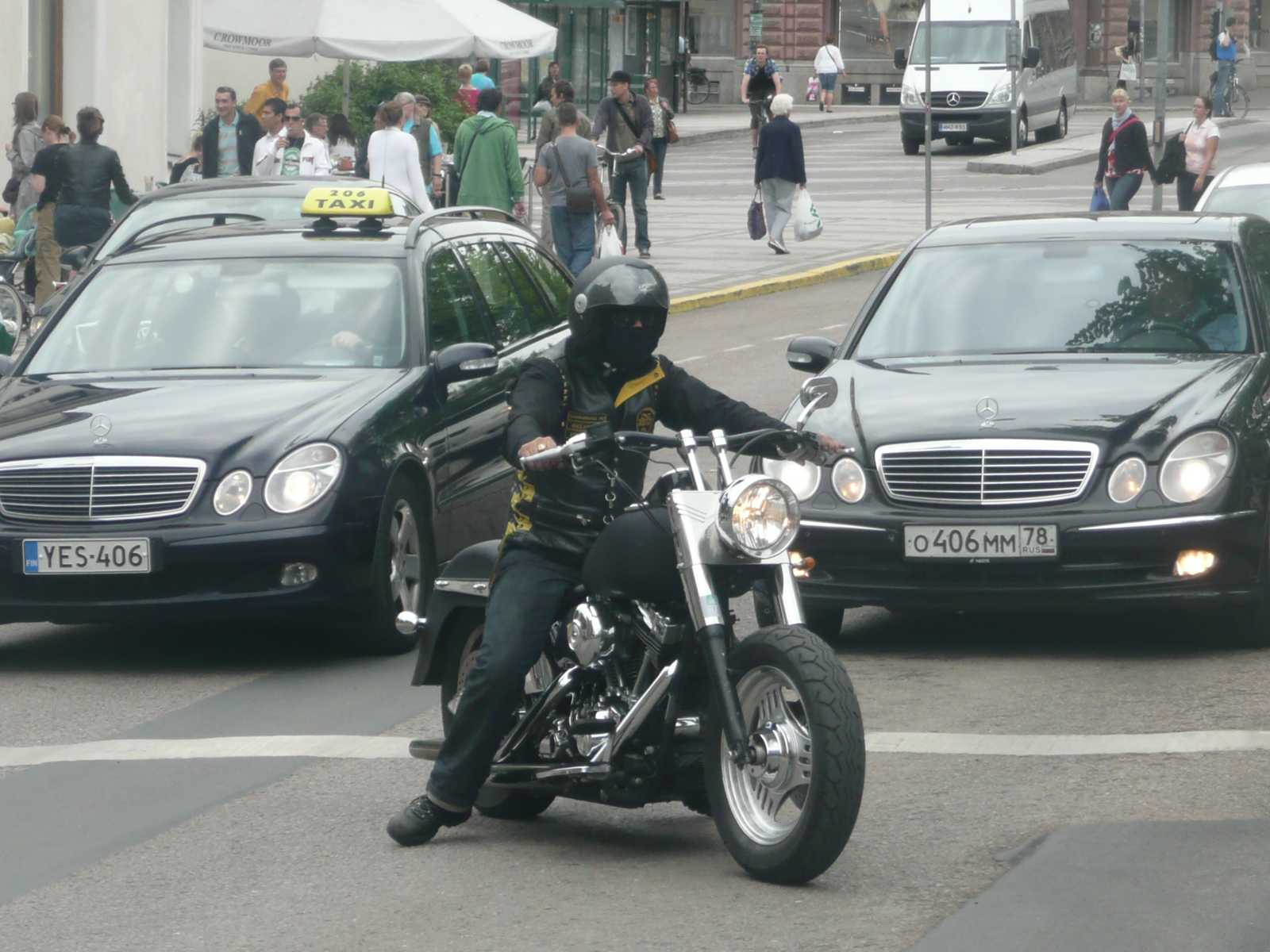
A Cannonball MC member in Helsinki, Finland in 2009.

The abbreviations MC and MCC are both used to mean "motorcycle club" but have a special social meaning from the point of view of the outlaw or one percenter motorcycling subculture. MC is generally reserved for those clubs that are mutually recognized by other MC or outlaw motorcycle clubs. This is indicated by a motorcyclist wearing an MC patch, or a three-piece patch called colors, on the back of their jacket or riding vest. Outlaw or one percenter can mean merely that the club is not chartered under the auspices of the American Motorcyclist Association, implying a radical rejection of authority and embracing of the "biker" lifestyle as defined and popularized since the 1950s and represented by such media as Easyriders magazine, the work of painter David Mann and others. In many contexts the terms overlap with the usual meaning of "outlaw" because some of these clubs, or some of their members, are recognized by law enforcement agencies as taking part in organized crime.

Outside of the outlaw motorcyclist subculture, the words "motorcycle club" carry no pejorative meaning beyond the everyday English definition of the words – a club involving motorcycles, whose members come from every walk of life. Thus, there are clubs that are culturally and stylistically nothing like outlaw or one percenter clubs, and whose activities and goals not similar to them at all, but still use three-part patches or the initials MC in their name or insignia.
