= Defensive driving =

Practice of anticipating dangerous driving situations

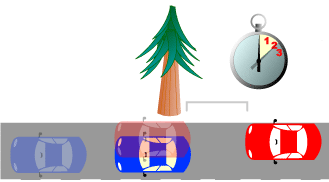
The two-second rule tells a defensive driver the minimum distance to avoid collision in ideal driving conditions. The red car's driver picks a tree to judge a two-second safety buffer.

Defensive driving describes the practice of anticipating dangerous situations, despite adverse conditions or the mistakes of others when operating a motor vehicle. (Note: The US standard Safe Practices for Motor Vehicle Operations, ANSI/ASSE Z15.1, defines defensive driving skills as "driving to save lives, time, and money, in spite of the conditions around you and the actions of others." This definition is taken from the National Safety Council's Defensive Driving Course.) It can be achieved by adhering to general guidelines, such as keeping a two- or three-second gap between the driver's vehicle and the vehicle in front to ensure adequate space to stop. It is a form of training for drivers that goes beyond road rules and the basic mechanics of driving techniques. Defensive driving reduces the risk of collisions and improves road safety.

== History ==
A driver safety program called the Driver Example Program was developed in 1964 by Chris Imhoff of the (US) National Safety Council. The program instituted a Defensive Driving Course (DDC). Defensive Driving Courses, along with Instructor Development Courses were offered beginning 1964 and 1965, typically through corporate sponsorships. A similar driving course is offered by the Traffic Safety Council of Zimbabwe.

== General principles ==
General main principles of driving defensively includes:

- Always plan for the unexpected
- Control their speed
- Respect other drivers on the road
- Prepared to react to other drivers
- Never assume other drivers’ intentions
- Adapt driving for different road conditions
- Always alert and not distracted while driving

== Training and courses ==
Several US government agencies, nonprofit organizations, and private schools have launched specialty courses that improve the public's driving skills. In the United States a few of the familiar courses in defensive driving include Alive at 25, DDC or Defensive Driving Course, Coaching the Mature Driver, Attitudinal Dynamics of Driving, Insurance discount, Seat Belt Safety, Handsfree, Professional Truck Driving, and DDC for Instructors. In relation to this, the government has launched active airbag and seat belt safety campaigns that encourage high visibility enforcement.

In addition to improving one's own driving skills, many US states provide an incentive to complete an approved defensive driving course by offering mandated insurance discounts or a way to mask a traffic ticket from one's driving record. In some instances, these courses are referred to as traffic school or a defensive driving school. States with the biggest incentives include Arizona, California, Florida, Nevada, New Jersey, New York, and Texas. A number of private providers offer a variety of courses. The methods and styles of the courses vary; but they are typically less comprehensive than training to pass an advanced driving test through the Institute of Advanced Motorists, Royal Society for the Prevention of Accidents Advanced Drivers and Riders, or British Motorcyclists Federation Blue Riband.

While US training has typically focused on handling skills – such as the Bondurant school of high-performance driving – British training has emphasized roadcraft. Defensive and advanced driving and motorcycling are commonly recognized in the UK, championed by charities such as the Institute of Advanced Motorists and the Royal Society for the Prevention of Accidents' Advanced Drivers and Riders.

=== Online Defensive Driving Courses ===
Online defensive driving courses are widely available in many U.S. states and allow drivers to complete training remotely. These programs are often approved by state authorities and may be used for purposes such as ticket dismissal, insurance discounts, or preventing points from being added to a driving record.

== Benefits of roadcraft ==
British research has shown advanced drivers who use the roadcraft system of car control are safer and have better fuel efficiency. The roadcraft system was devised in 1937 by racing driver Mark Everard Pepys, 6th Earl of Cottenham, to reduce accidents in police pursuits. A study by Brunel University found advanced drivers who had successfully completed the Institute of Advanced Motorists training were nearly 70% better in all aspects of their driving – from steering to judging distances and speed. Earlier research by Britain's Transport Research Laboratory that concluded drivers are less likely to crash if they have reached a measurable higher driving standard. Unpublished research by IAM Surety (an insurance company) showed that insurance claims by members of the Institute of Advanced Motorists were far cheaper than comparable non-members.

== See also ==
- Advanced driving test
- Assured Clear Distance Ahead
- Automobile safety
- Braking distance
- British Motorcyclists Federation
- Impact Teen Drivers
- Institute of Advanced Motorists
- Motor vehicle accident
- National Safety Council
- National Teen Driver Safety Week
- No fault
- Roadcraft
- Road-traffic safety
- Royal Society for the Prevention of Accidents
- Situation awareness
- Smith System (driving)
