= Fog eater =

The term fog eater has multiple meanings in various contexts.

- In railroad slang, a fog eater is an engineer.
- In motorcycling, "fog eater" is a trade name for helmet visors which don't fog.
- In meteorology, "A white bow in the clouds during foggy weather is so called. Such a bow was seen in England during January, 1888. A week preceding, the weather had been clear, sunshiny, and genial, then followed several days of thick fog, during which the white bow appeared. The bow was followed by several days of brilliant mild weather."
