= Motorcycle training =

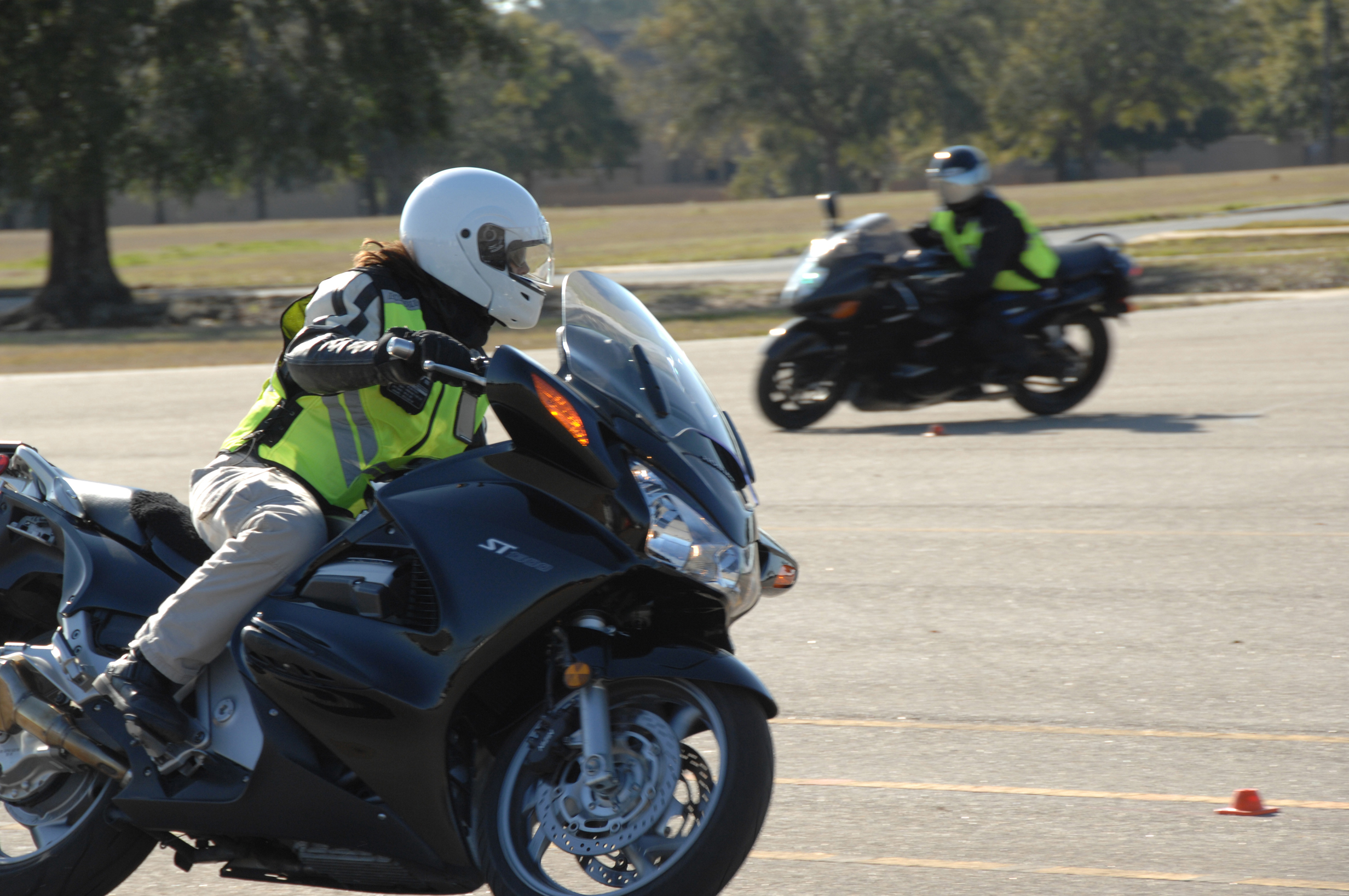
U.S. Army National Guard motorcycle riders conducting motorcycle training at Fort Rucker, Alabama

Motorcycle training teaches motorcycle riders the skills for riding on public roads. It is the equivalent of driver's education for car drivers. Training beyond basic qualification and licensing is available to those whose duty includes motorcycle riding, such as police, and additional rider courses are offered for street riding refreshers, sport riding, off-road techniques, and developing competitive skills for the motorcycle racetrack.

== Requirements and incentives ==
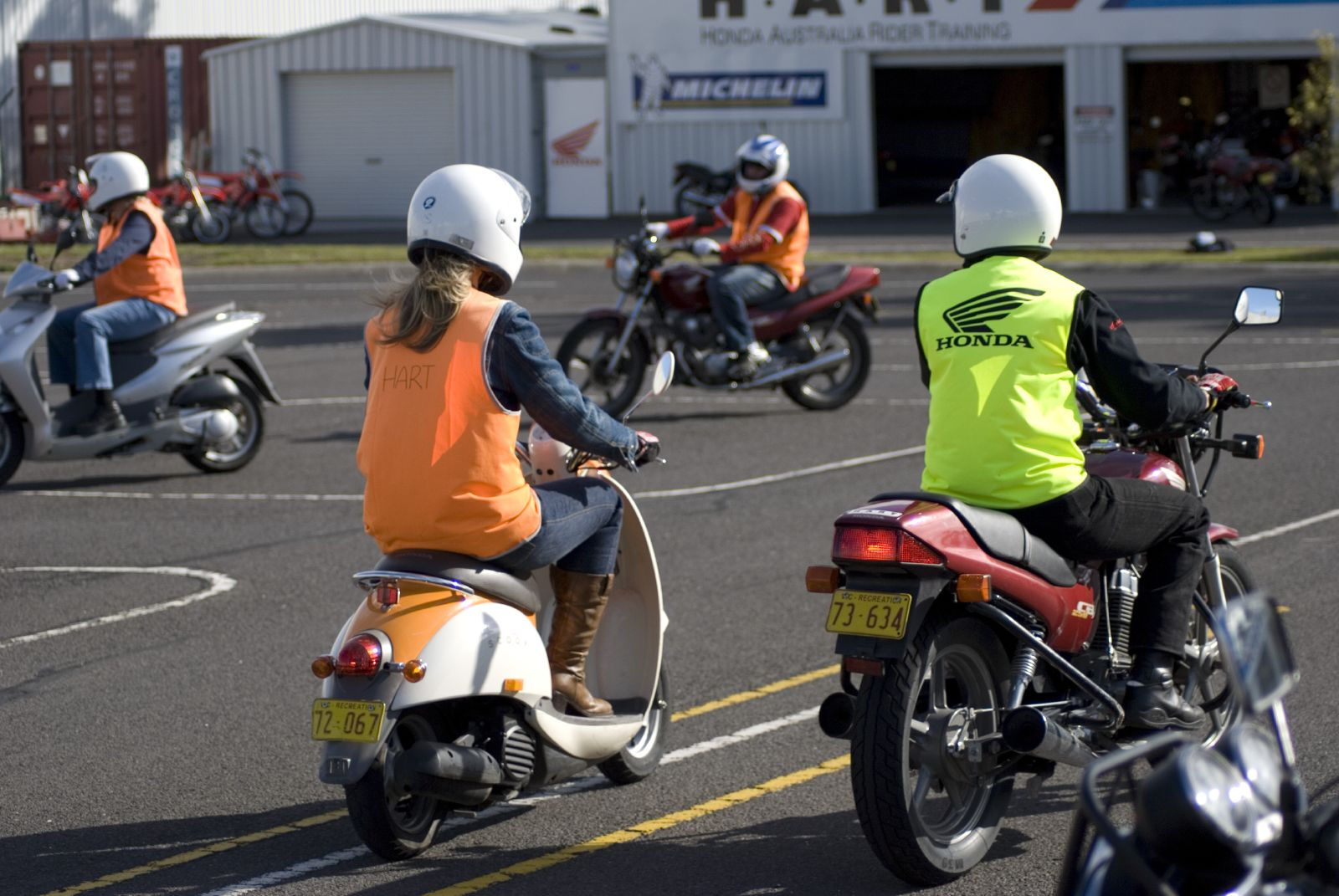
Factory-sponsored rider training in Australia

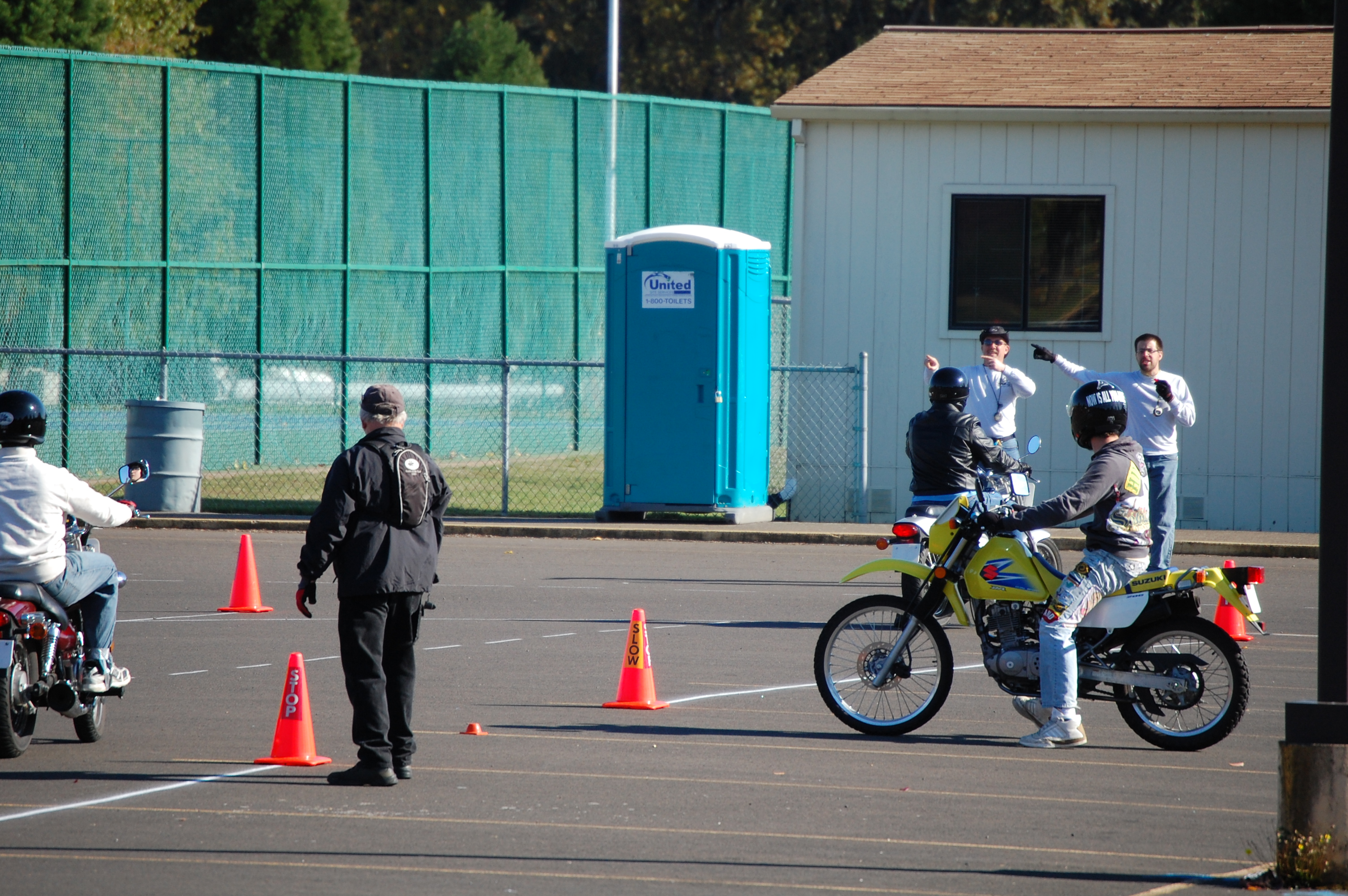
A motorcyclist receiving verbal instructions during training

Mandatory motorcycle training, known as Compulsory Basic Training, is common in Europe. There are also schools and organizations that provide training for beginners and refresher courses for experienced riders. In the United Kingdom organizations such as the Institute of Advanced Motorists (IAM) and Royal Society for the Prevention of Accidents (RoSPA) offer advanced rider training with the aim of reducing accident rates. Advanced training is optional but there is often an added incentive to riders in the form of reduced insurance premiums.

Many motorcycle training courses in the U.S. use the Motorcycle Safety Foundation (MSF) course materials. As of 2010, 31 states use the MSF tests for licensing, and 41 states use the MSF motorcycle operator manual. Completion of such courses often results in lower insurance rates, and all but five US states waive motorcyclist license testing for graduates of rider training courses such as the MSF.

== Research ==
The U.S. Hurt Report, begun in 1976 and published in 1981, expresses disdain for the ignorance and misinformation about motorcycle safety among riders studied, noting that 92% of riders in accidents had no formal training, compared to 84.3% of the riding population, and that when interviewed, riders frequently failed to take responsibility for their errors, or even perceive that accident avoidance had been possible. Hurt noted they held such misconceptions as the belief that deliberately falling down and sliding was a more effective accident avoidance strategy than strong, controlled application of the front brake. The final recommendations of the report include the advice that, "The Motorcycle Rider Course of the Motorcycle Safety Foundation should be the prerequisite (or at least corequisite) of licensing and use of a motorcycle in traffic."

However, when the European MAIDS report, conducted in 1999 to 2000, looked at motorcycle accidents and the riding population, in societies where rider training was both widely available and in general mandatory, they were unable to find conclusive evidence that riders without training were more likely to be involved in accidents. Nor were their interviews able to discern a significant difference between the number of riders who had been in accidents who were unqualified to operate their motorcycles, and the number among those who had not been in accidents. The MAIDS study did find that drivers of other vehicles were less likely to fail to perceive motorcycles in accidents if they themselves had a motorcycle license, and that motorcyclists riding illegally without a license were more likely to have accidents.

The MAIDS report does not conclude that training is unnecessary, but rather states that their results are inconclusive. Hurt's complaint was that in the absence of mandatory training, false information is passed from one generation of riders to the next, so it is to be expected that this particular problem would decrease in regions where training is generally mandatory. Years of riding and contact with other riders, in lieu of formal training, doesn't necessarily expose motorcyclists to accurate information. Open questions remain, however, such as why the overall safety of motorcycling in Europe is not significantly different than in the US.

== Armed forces off-duty riding ==
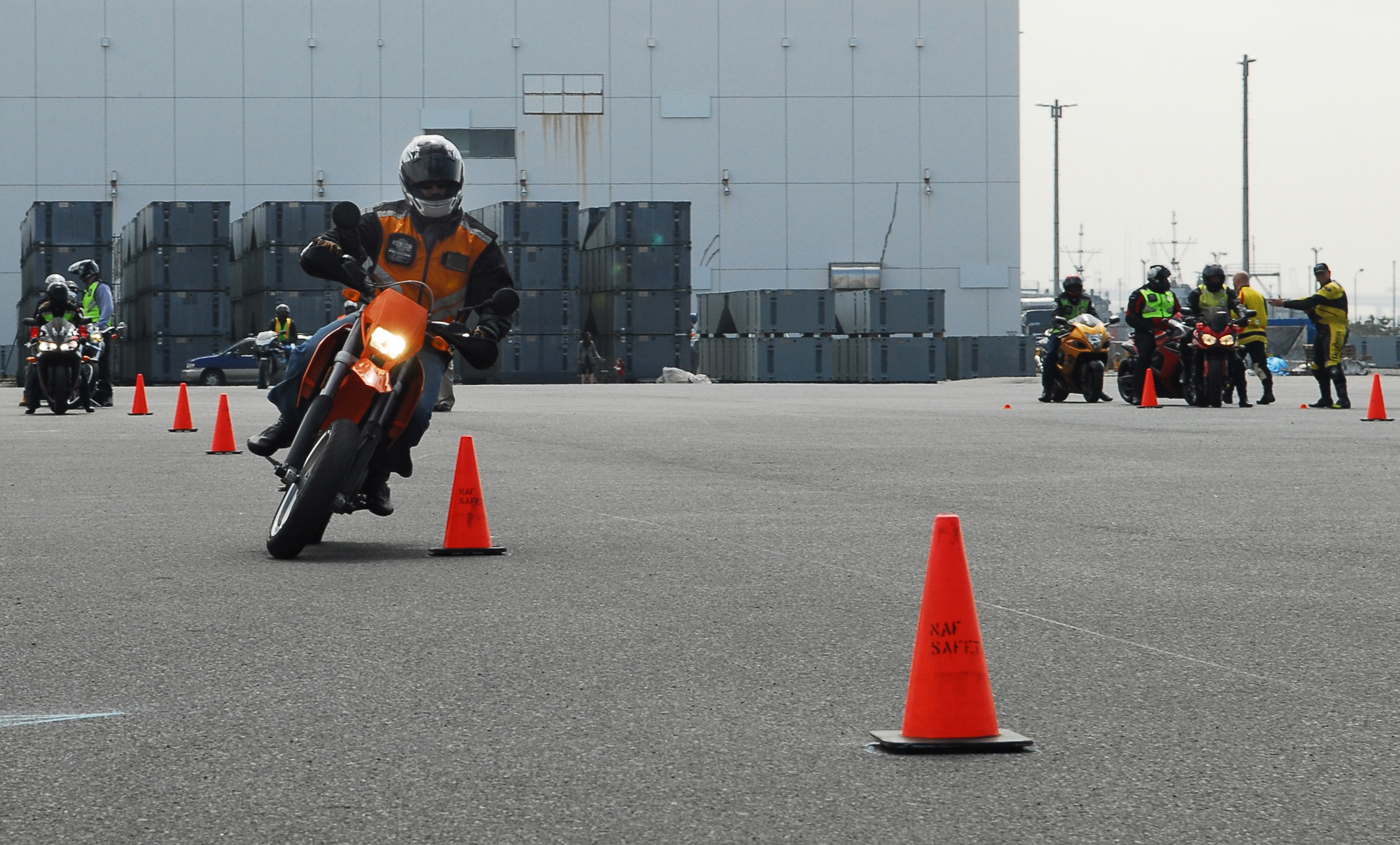
U.S. Navy service members riding motorcycles through an obstacle course in Yokohama, Japan

The US armed forces have responded to an increase in off-duty motorcycling accidents and deaths by strengthening existing requirements that service members take a motorcycle safety course and wear helmets, long sleeve shirts, pants, over the ankle shoes, and gloves even if not required locally if they wish to ride, as well as by offering rider training tailored to military motorcyclists. In response to the popularity of sport bikes among younger military riders, and the disproportionate representation of sports bikes in accident deaths, courses focusing on sport bike riding have been created at military installations around the world. These courses have been designed in cooperation with the MSF, and a conference on motorcycle safety with the MSF and high level military leadership was held at The Pentagon. The Marine Corps devoted a half day in conference with the top brass and the MSF in recognition of the seriousness of the problem. The military has also adopted new technology such as the Honda Smart Trainer, in Qatar and elsewhere.

The courses offered go beyond basic riding skills necessary to become licensed and focus on the specific areas identified as posing the greatest risk to the military riders. Another focus is military riders who wear uncertified "novelty" helmets or go without other protective gear required by regulations above and beyond local laws.

== Police motorcyclists ==
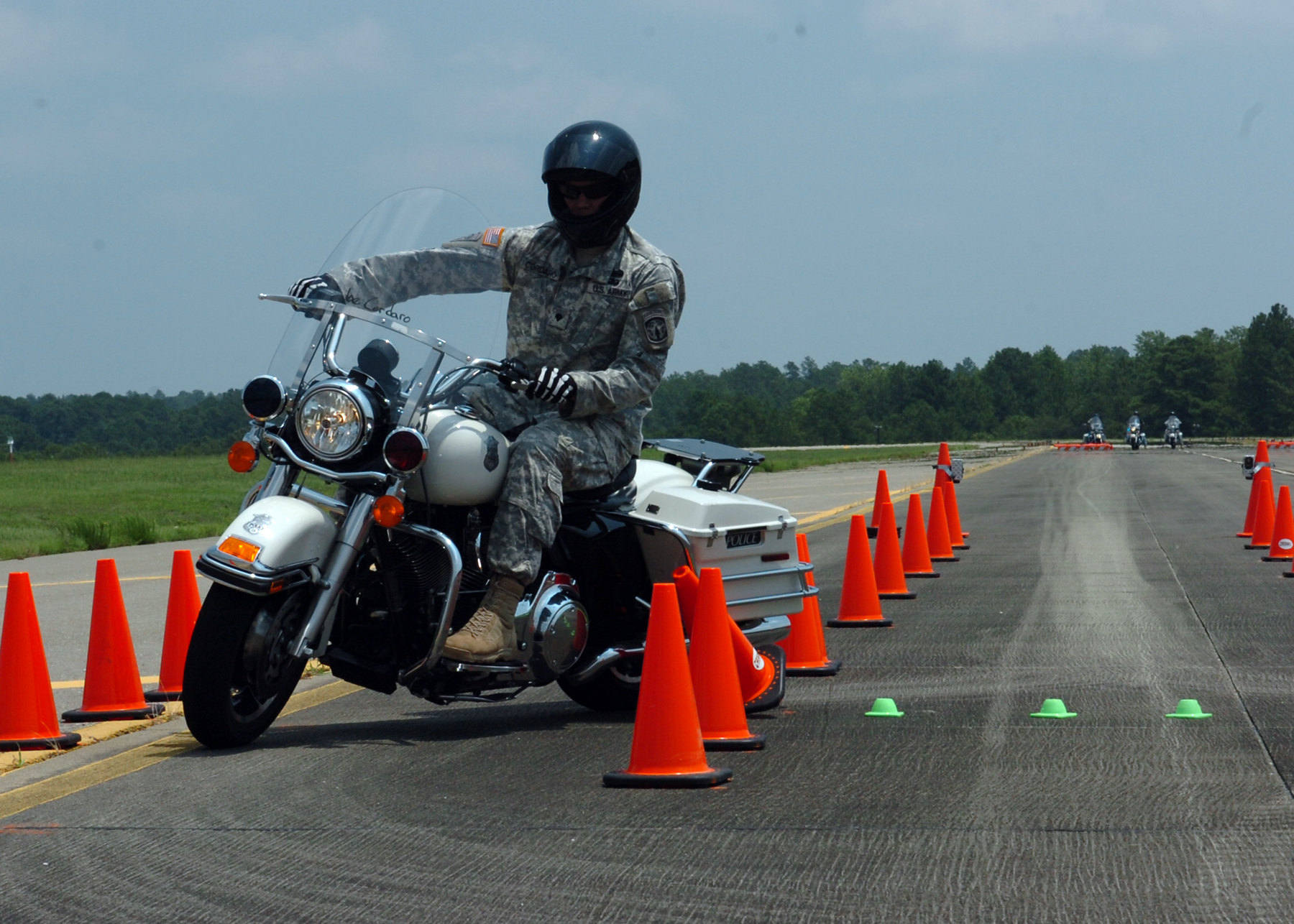
A U.S. Army Military Police Corps motorcyclist conducting training at Fort Bragg, North Carolina

Law enforcement motorcyclists, called motor officers in U.S. police jargon, benefit from advanced training, typically lasting one to three weeks, that covers safety during routine patrol, and police-specific riding like pursuit, as well as policing methods such as safely approaching a suspect's vehicle.

Like basic rider courses, police training is dominated by low-speed maneuvering. Much of what can go wrong on a motorcycle happens at low speed, and this is particularly true considering that the usual police motorcycle carries hundreds of pounds of equipment, often weighing even more than a fully loaded bike on tour. And where the touring bike would spend much time on open freeways and autobahns, the police motorcycle is lumbering through urban traffic, pedestrian zones, and narrow city streets. Very tight U-turns and paired riding with a second officer are typical of the techniques practiced, and police training can include riding on technically challenging surfaces, such as up and down stairs or loading ramps or on railroad tracks.

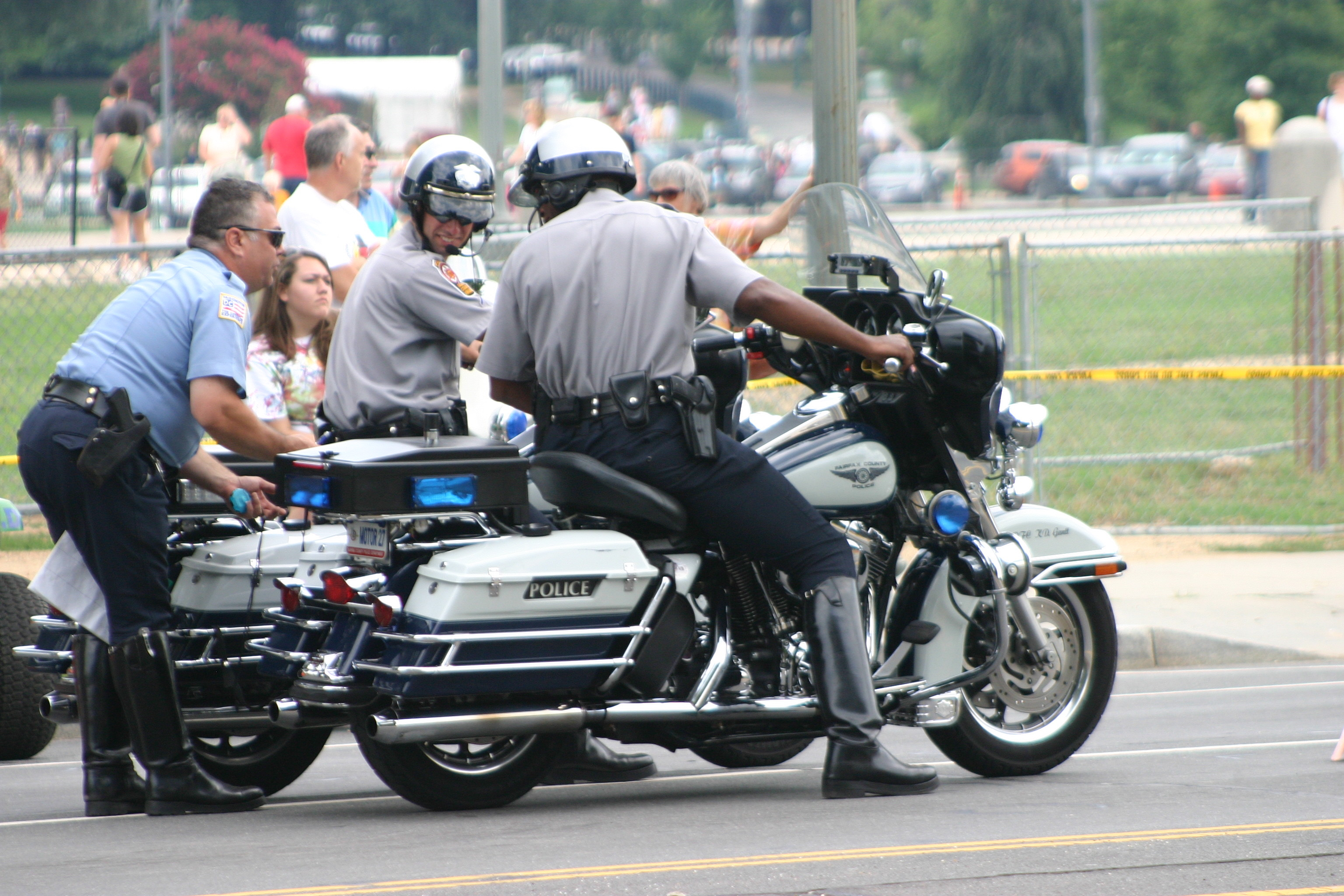
Fairfax County Police Department motorcycle officers at the National Police Motorcycle Rodeo, a competition of police motorcycle officers in courses resembling motorcycle training courses

Another difference between basic riding and police training is the frequency that police trainees fall down. While in the standard MSF course the student is not expected to fall at all, and can be removed from the class after more than a couple of spills, police motorcycle trainees can expect to drop their bikes dozens of times per day, and even hundreds of times during a two or three week course. The bikes used in training are equipped with crash bars to minimize the damage to the motorcycle, and the design of the bikes typically means they do not land entirely on their side or rest on the rider's feet or legs when they are dropped, however. Police trainees in the USA who bring their own motorcycles or their department's bikes to a training course are advised to expect between US$2400 to US$3200 in damage to their machines. Though severe injuries are not usually the result of these many crashes, it is exhausting, and a day of falling and picking up 800 to 1,100 lb (360 to 500 kg) bikes leaves motor officer students sore and aching.

Some current or former motor officers have come full circle by offering rider courses to the public based on the special skills and training methods used by police motorcyclists. In the United Kingdom, most civilian advanced training is based on Roadcraft, the police system of motorcycle control.

== Mnemonics ==
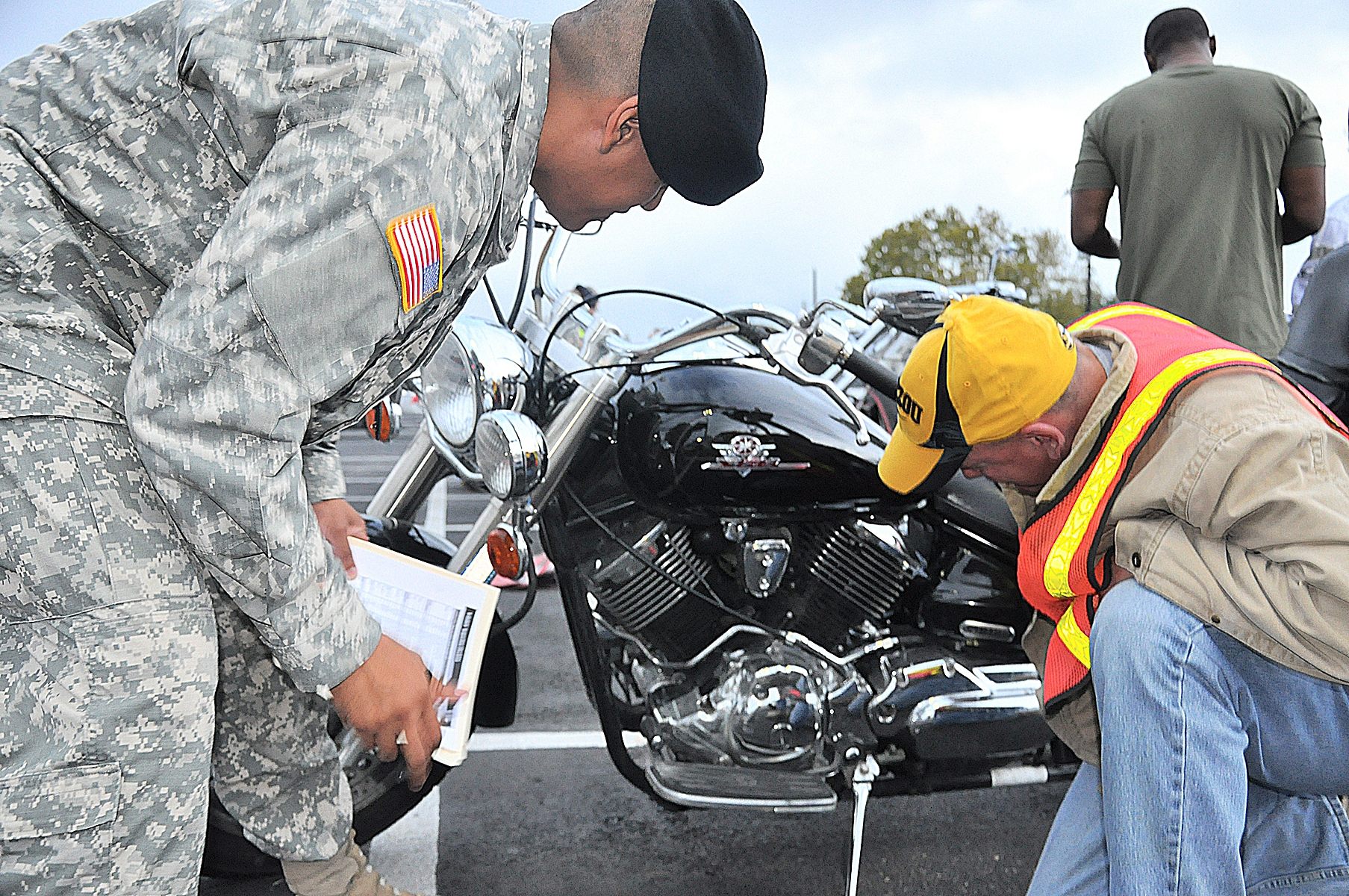
T-CLOCS pre-ride inspection checklist

Easy-to-remember acronyms and sayings have been added to various training curricula, or promoted by safety gurus, and have moved into common currency beyond the motorcycle safety classroom. Among them are:

- ATGATT: All the gear, all the time. Shorthand for a philosophy that a full set of motorcycle safety gear should be worn at all times, and gear should not be reduced at times when the perceived risk is less.
- FINE-C: Fuel, ignition, neutral, engine cut-off switch, choke and clutch. A standardized series of controls to engage when starting a motorcycle. Older motorcycles might not have an engine cut-off, and newer ones might not have a choke, and some types have no clutch, but remembering all 6 items, and skipping those that do not apply, is safe and effective.
- IPSGA Information, position, speed, gear, acceleration. Used by advanced motorcyclists in the UK as a reminder of the steps necessary when encountering any sort of hazard on the road. It was introduced as part of the Roadcraft system, which is used for training police, in the book Motorcycle Roadcraft: The Police Rider's Handbook.
- POWER Petrol, oil, water, electrics, rubber. Used in the UK for pre-ride safety checks. Sometimes presented as POWDER, where the additional letter D stands for damage.
- SEE Search, evaluate, execute. Used by the MSF to refer to a strategy for perceiving and reacting appropriately to the riding situation.
- T-CLOCS: Tires, controls, lights, oil, chassis, stands. These are the major parts of the motorcycle that should be checked before riding; each one has several sub-parts, such as tire pressure and tire tread. Claimed as a service mark and used in training materials distributed by the MSF.
- When the helmet drops, the bullshit stops. Motorcycling author Dave Preston's mantra, which he recites to himself every time he rides, even having been riding since 1967. It is a reminder to keep one's mind on riding and not to be distracted by other worries.

== See also ==
- Motorcycle safety
- Driving license
