= Young Driver Schemes =

Driving schemes for younger drivers have been set up throughout the UK in order to give driving experience to children before they reach driving age. These have been set up in car parks, racing tracks, and other suitable venues. Some of these driving experiences focus more on safety while other focus more on fun.

== Statistics ==
Statistics from Rospa show that 3000 car drivers aged under 25 are killed or injured in Britain every year. Statistics also say that one in five new drivers crash within six months of passing their test. Swedish research has shown that accident rates fall when driving has been introduced before the age of 17.

These schemes for young people aim to help reduce these statistics by promoting driving at a younger age when children are more susceptible to learning and have better memory. By doing this in a safe environment away from the public road, it is hoped that this will provide a basis for learner drivers' learning. There is, however, concern from safety groups that these schemes will prove to be detrimental to learning to drive.

The Driving Project is an under-17 programme launched within secondary schools in the UK in 2012
