= Roadcraft =

UK police handbook for car and motorcycle control

Diagram showing the four phases of the System of Car & Motorcycle Control, as explained in Roadcraft

Roadcraft refers to the system of car or motorcycle control outlined in two books Roadcraft: The Police Driver's Handbook and Motorcycle Roadcraft: The Police Rider's Handbook. The books are produced by the Police Foundation and published by His Majesty's Stationery Office (HMSO).

== Overview ==
Roadcraft is the UK's police handbook that outlines a system of car and motorcycle control split into four phases represented by the acronym IPSGA:

1. Information is not a phase in itself but is received from the outside world by observation, and given by use of signals such as direction indicators, headlamp flashes, and horn; is a general theme running continuously throughout the application of the system by taking, using and giving information;
2. Position on the road optimised for safety, visibility and correct routing, followed by best progress;
3. Speed appropriate to the hazard being approached, attained via explicit braking or throttle control (engine braking), always being able to stop in the distance you can see to be clear on your side of the road;
4. Gear appropriate for maximum vehicle control through the hazard, selected in one shift; and
5. Acceleration for clearing the hazard safely.

The taking, using and giving of Information is, arguably, most important and surrounds (and drives) the four phases PSGA. It may, and often should, be re-applied at any phase in the System.

The System is used whenever a hazard requires a manoeuvre. A hazard is something which requires a change in speed, direction or both. The benefit of applying a systematic approach to driving is to reduce the simultaneous demands on the vehicle, the driver mentally and the driver physically. That is, the System seeks to separate out the phases of a manoeuvre into a logical sequence so that the vehicle and the driver avoid being overwhelmed by having to do too much at the same time. For example, braking and steering at the same time place greater demands on the vehicle's available grip and in the worst case can lead to a skid.

Whilst the books were originally put together at the Metropolitan Police Driving School at Hendon, and intended for police drivers and riders, they have been available for sale to the general public since the mid-1950s. Civilian advanced driving organisations such as RoSPA and the Institute of Advanced Motorists base their teaching and advanced motoring tests on Roadcraft.

== Motorcycle Roadcraft ==
The development of the Police Foundation book Motorcycle Roadcraft traces the lineage of the System of Car Control from police driver training at Hendon to a civilian riding framework that informs contemporary motorcycle safety and training practices. Roadcraft embodies a cognitive approach to risk, information interpretation, and vehicle control that has shaped advanced riding for over ninety years. Roadcraft is more than a manual; it is a structured method of thinking about information, position, speed, gear, and acceleration in pursuit of safe, predictable riding.

=== Origins at Hendon ===
Roadcraft’s intellectual foundations lie in the Metropolitan Police Driving School at Hendon, established in 1934 to address rising collision rates and to systematise police driver training. Commissioner Hugh Trenchard recruited Mark Pepys, 6th Earl of Cottenham, whose emphasis on observation, anticipation, and decision-making framed a shift from purely mechanical skills to cognitive discipline. Cottenham’s work laid the groundwork for the System of Car Control, a sequential method designed to reduce impulsive driving and stabilise vehicle behaviour. The sequence was formalised as IPSGA: Information, Position, Speed, Gear, Acceleration, intended to create predictable performance under routine and pursuit conditions. Hendon instructors mandated separate braking and gear-changing, prohibited input overlap, and required spoken commentary to articulate hazards, intentions, and decisions. By the early 1950s, Hendon’s doctrine had become the British police standard, transmitted primarily through training rather than publication.

==== Cognitive emphasis and the System of Car Control ====
Cottenham recognised that safe driving was not merely a matter of mechanical skill but of cognitive discipline. He emphasised the importance of observation, anticipation, and decision‑making, arguing that drivers must constantly interpret the environment and adjust their behaviour accordingly. This cognitive emphasis distinguished the Hendon system from earlier approaches, which focused primarily on mechanical control. Cottenham developed the early curriculum and laid the foundation for what would become the System of Car Control, a sequential method designed to eliminate impulsive or reflexive driving behaviour. The system emphasised continuous observation, deliberate positioning, controlled speed adjustment, timely gear selection and stable acceleration. This sequence—later formalised as IPSGA (Information, Position, Speed, Gear, Acceleration)—was intended to create predictable, stable vehicle behaviour under both routine and pursuit conditions. Hendon instructors enforced strict separation of braking and gear‑changing, prohibited overlapping control inputs, and required trainees to give spoken commentary while driving, articulating hazards, intentions, and decision‑making processes. By the early 1950s, Hendon’s doctrine had become the de facto standard for police driving across Britain. However, it remained largely internal, transmitted through training rather than publication.

=== Roadcraft for civilians ===
Cottenham’s notes were published in 1954 as Attention All Drivers! by Jock Taylor, a former Hendon instructor. In 1955 the Home Office codified the System of Car Control and published Road Craft: Roadcraft: A Manual of Driving Instruction for Students of the Motor Car Wings at the Metropolitan Police Driving School, articulating a structured sequence to guide decision-making. The manual defined a cognitive scaffold: information gathering and interpretation; positioning to maximise safety, visibility, and stability; speed control to ensure safe stopping within visible distance; gear selection for the manoeuvre; and acceleration to stabilise the vehicle. Civilians adopted Roadcraft, though its car-centric physics did not fully capture motorcycle dynamics.

==== Information, Position, Speed, Gear, Acceleration ====
The manual articulated the structured sequence of car control that provided a cognitive scaffold for decision‑making. This sequence was not intended as a rigid formula but as a disciplined method of organising thought. Information formed the foundation of all decisions, requiring drivers to gather, interpret, and prioritise environmental cues. Positioning was used to maximise safety, visibility, and stability. Speed was controlled to ensure that the vehicle could be stopped safely within the distance visible and clear. Gear selection prepared the vehicle for the required manoeuvre, and acceleration stabilised the vehicle and completed the action. Civilians quickly adopted Roadcraft, but its car‑centric physics did not fully address motorcycle dynamics.

=== First Motorcycle Roadcraft (1965) ===
Motor Cycle Roadcraft, a 68-page motorcycle edition, was published in 1965 by Her Majesty's Stationery Office (HMSO), authored by senior police riders from Hendon and the Home Office Police Training Council. It codified the police riding system for civilian motorcyclists, adapting it to single-track dynamics (lean angle, counter-steering, balance) while preserving the cognitive structure: Information as the foundation; Positioning for safety; Speed as a controllable variable; Gear selection as preparation; and Acceleration as stabiliser. The initial edition was mechanically toned, assuming carburetted engines, bias-ply tires, drum brakes, and a pre-roundabout, pre-ABS road environment.

==== Three pillars of the 1965 edition ====
The System of Motorcycle Control, adapting IPSGA to motorcycles and forbidding overlapping braking and gear changes.

Cornering Stability, introducing “positive throttle” to stabilise suspension geometry mid-corner.

Limit-Point Analysis, describing the “vanishing point” method for safe cornering speeds. It also presented the Ten Commandments for police riders, including codes on highway code, concentration, thinking before acting, restraint, deliberate overtaking, and other safety principles.

===== Ten Commandments =====
The 1965 edition contained the ‘Ten Commandments’ that each police candidate of the Motor Cycle Wing was expected to learn word perfectly.

- Know the Highway Code. (Ride according to the Highway Code and you will ride safely and well.)
- Concentrate all the time and you will avoid accidents. (Concentration assists anticipation)
- Think before acting. (Think and avoid accidents)
- Exercise restraint and ‘Hang Back’ when necessary. (A good maxim is-whenever in doubt, hang back).
- Ride with deliberation and overtake as quickly as possible. (Deliberation eliminates uncertainty).
- Use speed intelligently and ride fast only in the right places. (Any fool can ride fast enough to be dangerous).
- Develop your motorcycle sense and reduce wear and tear to a minimum. (Good motorcycle sense increases the life of your machine).
- Use your horn thoughtfully, give proper signals and never black out your headlight. (Give good signals and earn the praise of fellow road users).
- Be sure your motorcycle is roadworthy and know its capabilities. (Motorcycle and rider must blend harmoniously to ensure good riding).
- Perfect your Roadcraft and acknowledge courtesies extended to you by other road users. (Courtesy is a great factor in road safety).

==== Context and assumptions ====
The first edition was heavily mechanical in tone. It assumed carburetted engines, bias‑ply tyres, drum brakes, non‑adjustable suspension, minimal traffic density, no roundabouts on high‑speed roads, no dual‑carriageway filtering and no ABS or traction control. It was a manual for a world of BSA A10s, Triumph Thunderbirds, Norton Commandos, and early police BMWs.

=== Evolution through revisions ===
1973 revised edition: added a motorway chapter, based on Roadcraft’s 1968 revision.

==== 1978 third edition ====
The first major rewrite of Motorcycle Road Craft was the 1978 third edition which was based on the 1977 car edition of Roadcraft. This edition, now expanded to 96-pages, responded to rising traffic density, the introduction of roundabouts, the emergence of Japanese motorcycles with disc brakes, early electronic ignition and the first generation of fairings and screens. Key developments included revised positioning guidance. The early editions assumed wide, open roads, but this edition emphasised lane discipline, positioning for visibility at roundabouts, overtaking in multi lane environments and defensive positioning in urban traffic. Disc brakes and improved tyre compounds required updated braking guidance. The manual began to distinguish between emergency braking, progressive braking and braking in bends, which was still discouraged, but now acknowledged as sometimes necessary. The concept of ‘hazard perception’ began to appear, though not yet formalised.

==== 1980s refinement ====
The 1980s saw further refinement of the System of Car Control, driven by research in human factors and road safety. Studies of collision causation emphasised the role of observation failures, misjudgement, and cognitive overload. These findings reinforced the importance of the Information phase, which became increasingly central to Roadcraft pedagogy. The manual emphasised the need for continuous scanning, hazard perception, and anticipation, reflecting a broader shift toward cognitive approaches in road safety.

=== Later major rewrites ===
1996 edition: coinciding with Compulsory Basic Training (CBT) and Direct Access Scheme (DAS) reforms, the Police Foundation oversaw a rewrite to emphasize information, observation, anticipation, and psychological awareness; civilian riders adopted the system within formalized novice training and licensing frameworks. The 1996 edition expanded to 192 pages, updating hazard perception and urban/rural riding guidance, and incorporating modern riding contexts such as bus lanes, cycle lanes, night riding, retro-reflective clothing, and wet-weather considerations.

2000 edition: the technology shift (ABS, fuel injection, traction control) prompted a revised braking doctrine enabling controlled braking in bends and ABS-assisted emergency braking; acceleration sense was expanded to judge speed changes without relying on brakes. The DVSA Hazard Perception Test (introduced 2002) integrated scanning techniques and hazard analysis, and group riding guidance was added, including staggered formation and overtaking etiquette.

2013 Third EU Driving Licence Directive (3DLD): mandated staged licensing with Module 1 slow-speed control requirements (slalom, figure-of-eight, U-turn, controlled stop) and off-road hazard-avoidance maneuvers; Roadcraft integrated standing on foot-pegs, weight transfer, and off-road stability for adventure motorcycles.

Modern era (2020–2025): editions reflect ABS, traction control, IMU stability, radar, LED lighting, navigation tech, and electric motorcycles; content covers advanced hazard perception, cognitive load management, risk-based filtering, and distraction management. The 2025 edition adds screen-glance discipline, audio-navigation risk, CE armour and protective equipment standards, wildlife and climate-related road degradation, and microclimate considerations.

==== 1996 edition ====
The 1990 introduction of Compulsory Basic Training (CBT) and the 1997 Direct Access Scheme (DAS) fundamentally changed the training landscape. In 1994, the Police Foundation assumed responsibility for producing Roadcraft, and, at the request of the Association of Chief Police Officer, the National Police Driving Schools’ Conference Motorcycle Roadcraft Working Party undertook the second major rewrite of Motorcycle Roadcraft. They employed educational writer, consultant, and curriculum specialist Philip Coyne, editor Penny Mares, and designer Bill Mayblin, to completely rewrite the car and motorcycle handbooks. Working alongside police driving schools, Coyne helped shift the handbooks from a rigid set of rule structures to an intellectual system focused heavily on information, observation, anticipation, and psychological awareness.

The 1996 edition, the police foundation Motorcycle ROADCRAFT: police rider’s handbook to better motorcycling, published by The Stationery Office, doubled in size to 192 pages and updated the core principles of hazard perception, and fundamentally changed how the text was taught to both police trainees and civilian advanced riders. It aligned with formalised novice training, staged licensing, the emergence of high‑performance motorcycles accessible to new riders and the widespread adoption of dual‑carriageways and motorways. Major additions in this edition saw the inclusion of instruction on urban riding and traffic systems like bus lanes, cycle lanes, pedestrianised zones, filtering and lane splitting (with caution); night riding and visibility, particularly retro‑reflective clothing and conspicuity science. The rise of radial tyres and improved compounds meant Roadcraft updated its guidance on wet‑weather braking, cold tyres, diesel spills, frost and microclimates. Although motorways had existed since 1958, this edition finally included joining and leaving motorways, lane discipline, overtaking strategy and dealing with high‑speed turbulence.

==== 2000 edition ====
By 2000, motorcycle technology had changed dramatically: ABS became common, traction control appeared on high‑end machines, fuel injection replaced carburettors, sports bikes reached unprecedented performance levels and adventure bikes and touring machines grew in popularity. Motorcycle Roadcraft contained key changes including a revised braking doctrine where the original 1965 prohibition on braking mid‑corner was softened. ABS changed the risk profile, and Roadcraft began to acknowledge controlled braking in bends, emergency braking with ABS and rear‑wheel lift mitigation. The concept of ‘acceleration sense’—the ability to judge speed changes without relying on brakes—was expanded and formalised.

With the introduction of the DVSA Hazard Perception Test in 2002, Roadcraft incorporated scanning techniques, anticipation cues and behavioural hazard analysis. Group riding was included, with the manual adding guidance on staggered formation, overtaking etiquette and communication signals. The overtaking chapter became more detailed, reflecting increased traffic density, higher vehicle speeds and more complex road layouts.

==== 2013 Third EU Driving Licence Directive (3DLD) ====
The 2013 Third EU Driving Licence Directive (3DLD) created a tiered motorcycle licensing system that matches rider age and experience to specific engine sizes and power limits. This required Motorcycle Roadcraft to align with staged progression, high‑speed manoeuvre testing and the off‑road Module 1 requirements. The slow‑speed control Module 1 required the inclusion of a slalom, figure‑of‑eight, U‑turn and a controlled stop. The off‑road hazard‑avoidance manoeuvre (minimum 50 km/h) led to new guidance on counter‑steering, rapid steering inputs and the emergency swerve technique. With the rise of adventure bikes, Motorcycle Roadcraft added standing on foot-pegs, weight transfer and off‑road stability principles.

==== Modern era (2020–2025) ====
The 2020 edition of Motorcycle Roadcraft reflected the widespread availability of ABS and traction control, cornering ABS, IMU‑based stability systems, adaptive cruise control, radar‑based collision warning, LED lighting, dash‑mounted navigation, helmet‑mounted cameras, the rise of electric motorcycles, and advice about filtering and lane splitting.

Modern editions have sections on advanced hazard perception through behavioural psychology, cognitive load management and situational awareness models. With increased urban congestion, Roadcraft now provides risk‑based filtering guidance, visibility management and speed differential limits, digital navigation and distraction.

The 2025 edition includes screen‑glance discipline, audio navigation risks, cognitive distraction management, protective equipment science with reference to CE armour ratings, airbag vests and abrasion resistance standards. New content addresses environmental considerations including wildlife hazards, climate‑related road degradation and microclimate traction changes.

=== Roadcraft’s ongoing influence and obsolescence ===
Some pre-1965 doctrines are now obsolete due to technological advances (e.g., braking mid-corner, non-overlap of braking and gear changes, carburettor-based throttle guidance, drum brakes, outdated visibility assumptions, and mechanical stability doctrine). Yet three principles remain foundational: the IPSGA backbone; Limit-Point Analysis; and Information as the decision-maker, with observation remaining central.

==== Obsolete doctrines ====
Several doctrines from the 1965 edition are now obsolete:

Prohibition on braking mid‑corner - Modern ABS and traction control allow controlled braking in bends.

Non‑overlap of braking and gear changes - Modern clutch and gearbox technology allow safe overlap.

Carburettor‑based throttle response guidance - Fuel injection changed throttle behaviour entirely.

Drum‑brake stopping distances - Modern discs, ABS, and radial tyres made early braking tables irrelevant.

Visibility assumptions - 1960s traffic density and vehicle size assumptions no longer apply.

Mechanical stability doctrine - Modern suspension, IMUs, and traction control changed stability dynamics.

==== Enduring principles ====
Despite more than sixty years of change, three principles remain untouched:

The System of Motorcycle Control IPSGA remains the backbone of UK advanced riding.

Limit‑Point Analysis Still the gold standard for cornering safety.

Information as the foundation of all riding decisions Observation remains the core of Roadcraft.

=== Lineage and civilian adoption ===
Hendon’s pedagogy influenced civilian advanced riding through IAM RoadSmart and RoSPA since the 1990s, with Roadcraft forming the basis of assessment frameworks that emphasize cognitive discipline and situational awareness. Roadcraft also informs the DVSA Enhanced Rider Scheme (ERS) and BikeSafe, underscoring its continued relevance to contemporary motorcycle safety and training.

==== Civilian advanced training ====
The 1990s and 2000s saw the integration of Roadcraft into civilian advanced riding through organisations such as IAM RoadSmart and RoSPA. These organisations adopted the System as the foundation of their assessment frameworks, reflecting its conceptual strength and practical utility. IAM and RoSPA assessments evaluated riders’ ability to apply the System consistently, demonstrating cognitive discipline, situational awareness, and machine control. The adoption of Roadcraft by civilian organisations reflected a recognition that the principles developed for police riders were equally applicable to the general public.

==== Broader influence ====
Roadcraft’s influence extends beyond police and civilian advanced training. It has shaped the development of the DVSA Enhanced Rider Scheme (ERS), which incorporates Roadcraft principles into post‑test training. It has also influenced the design of BikeSafe, the police‑led assessment programme that introduces riders to Roadcraft concepts through observed rides and feedback. The integration of Roadcraft into these programmes reflects a recognition that cognitive discipline is central to motorcycle safety, and that the principles developed at Hendon in 1934 remain relevant in the twenty‑first century.

==== Intellectual lineage ====
The intellectual lineage of Roadcraft is therefore a story of continuity and adaptation. Its core principles have remained intact for ninety years, yet they have been refined and expanded to reflect advances in psychology, engineering, and pedagogy. Roadcraft is not merely a manual; it is a method of thinking, a disciplined approach to risk, and a cognitive framework that has shaped the development of motorcycle training in Britain for generations.
