= Smith System (driving) =

Defensive driving system

The Smith System is a defensive driving strategy created in 1952 by Harold L. Smith. Smith's goal was to increase the safety of commercial drivers. After he opened the Safeway Driving School in Detroit in 1948, Smith established the Smith System Driver Improvement Institute in 1952.

The Smith System is built around five driving habits:

1. Aim high in steering — look far ahead to have the greatest possible reaction time to dangers
2. Get the big picture – be aware of your surroundings
3. Keep your eyes moving – constant eye movement helps keep you alert
4. Leave yourself an out – do not allow other drivers to box you in
5. Make sure they see you – remove assumptions about other drivers

The company remains active, headquartered in Arlington, Texas. The company claims that it has trained drivers from more than half of the Fortune 500 companies.
