= Luke Evans (cricketer) =

English cricketer

Personal information
- Born: 26 April 1987 (age 39); Sunderland, England
- Height: 6 ft 10 in (2.08 m)
- Batting: Right-handed
- Bowling: Right-arm medium-fast
- Role: Bowler

Domestic team information
- Years: Team
- 2007–2010: Durham
- 2010–2012: Northamptonshire (squad no. 25)

Career statistics
Competition	FC	LA	T20
Matches	8	9	3
Runs scored	31	19	–
Batting average	5.16	6.33	–
100s/50s	0/0	0/0	–
Top score	8*	18	–
Balls bowled	1,075	240	54
Wickets	26	7	3
Bowling average	25.61	39.00	23.33
5 wickets in innings	0	0	0
10 wickets in match	0	0	0
Best bowling	4/38	2/46	1/15
Catches/stumpings	1/–	2/–	0/–
- Source: CricketArchive, 4 April 2016

Luke Evans (born 26 April 1987) is an English professional first-class cricketer who played for Durham and Northamptonshire. He is primarily a right-arm fast medium bowler.

Measuring at a giant 6'10", Evans is a product of the Durham academy, whom he went on to make his first-class debut for in 2007 against a Sri Lanka A side. He first joined Northamptonshire on a 1-month loan on 15 April 2010, but stayed at the county for only 16 days before being recalled. At the end of the 2010 season Evans was released and was immediately snapped up by David Capel at Northants.

Evans's Northants career had been blighted by injuries, but he returned at the end of the 2012 season gaining 12 wickets in total against Gloucestershire and Hampshire, this prompted coach David Ripley to offer him a new one-year contract. He was unable to break into the first team the following season, and was released by Northants. Since then, he has played club cricket for Kibworth, in the Leicestershire and Rutland Cricket League.

Evans still lives in the Northamptonshire area and works with the British Racing Drivers Club at Silverstone.

== Career best performances ==
as of 24 December 2012

	Batting				Bowling			
	Score	Fixture	Venue	Season	Figures	Fixture	Venue	Season
FC	8*	Northamptonshire v Gloucestershire	Bristol	2010	4/38	Northamptonshire v Gloucestershire	Bristol	2012
LA	18	Northamptonshire Steelbacks v Hampshire Royals	Northampton	2011	2/46	Northamptonshire Steelbacks v Yorkshire Carnegie	Northampton	2012
T20	–				1/15	Northamptonshire Steelbacks v Leicestershire Foxes	Leicester	2011
