= BMW Motorcycle Owners of America =

American motorcycle club

The BMW Motorcycle Owners of America (BMW MOA) is a motorcycle club for owners and admirers of BMW motorcycles. As of 2008, it had 39,700 members. BMW MOA was founded in 1972 in Chicago by five enthusiasts.

The club is now based in Greer, South Carolina, and was formerly based in a suburb of St. Louis. It publishes a monthly magazine, BMW Owners News and an annual Anonymous book to assist touring riders in difficulty. Though founded in the United States, BMW MOA has members across the world. Since 1973 the club has held an annual rally in the United States and once in Canada.

== See also ==
- Outline of motorcycles and motorcycling
