= Compulsory Basic Training =

Motorcycle training in the United Kingdom

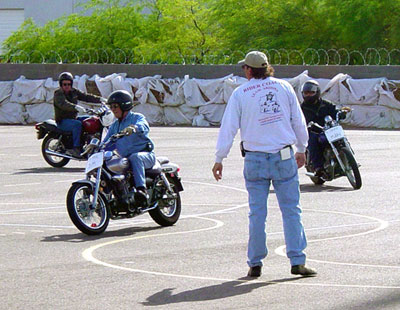
Students engaged in off-road training. In this stage of the CBT, the learner is acclimatised with bicycle manoeuvres and awareness before progressing to on-road training.

In the United Kingdom, the term Compulsory Basic Training (abbreviated to CBT) is a preliminary vehicular training course which must be completed by people wishing to ride a motorcycle or moped unaccompanied on the road, and remains valid for 2 years upon completion. It was introduced in Great Britain on 1 December 1990 as a means of reducing accidents on the road caused by inexperienced drivers by reviewing aspects of riding both on and off the road with a qualified motorcycle instructor registered with an Approved Training Body (ATB). If a full car licence was obtained before 1 February 2001 it is not necessary to complete a CBT course to ride a moped.

A CBT allows a rider to ride a moped up to 50 cc with a provisional licence from 16 years of age, and a motorbike up to 125 cc from 17 years of age.

Compulsory Basic Training consists of five elements;

- Element A - Introduction and eyesight test.
- Element B - Learning the controls of the motorcycle.
- Element C - Off-road riding.
- Element D - Road briefing and safety talk.
- Element E - Practical on-road riding.

Northern Ireland introduced CBT in 2011. As of 21 February 2011 learner riders in Northern Ireland must complete CBT before being allowed on the road unaccompanied. Those who obtained their provisional motorcycle/moped licence before the implementation of CBT in Northern Ireland had until 21 February 2012 to pass their motorbike test, or else take CBT to continue riding as a learner. Those who passed a car test prior to 21 February 2011 have their full moped entitlement preserved without having to take CBT.

Once passing the CBT, riders can begin practising on the roads alone for their full moped or motorcycle test.

== Bibliography ==
1. United Kingdom Driver and Vehicle Licensing Agency. 2006. "Driver Licensing for Motorcyclists" [Online] Available: http://www.dvla.gov.uk/media/pdf/leaflets/inf31.pdf [18 August 2006]
2. United Kingdom Government, Directgov. 2008. About compulsory basic training [Online] Available: http://www.direct.gov.uk/en/Motoring/LearnerAndNewDrivers/RidingMotorcyclesAndMopeds/DG_4022430 [11 May 2008]
3. United Kingdom Driving Standards Agency. 2001. Motorcycle Safety Program (Definition of Compulsory Basic Training syllabus) [Online] Available http://www.dsa.gov.uk/download.asp?path=/documents/foi/other/ia00086pa.pdf
4. UNITED KINGDOM. 1998. Road Traffic Act 1988 (c. 52). OPSI Archives [Laws]
5. UNITED KINGDOM. 1998. Road Traffic (Vehicle Testing) Act 1999. OPSI Archives [Laws]
6. UNITED KINGDOM. 1998. Statutory Instrument 1998 No. 20 - The Motor Vehicles (Driving Licences) (Amendment) Regulations OPSI Archives [Laws]
7. UNITED KINGDOM. 2003. Statutory Instrument 2003 No. 166 - The Motor Vehicles (Driving Licences) (Amendment) Regulations OPSI Archives [Laws]
8. United Kingdom Department for Transport. 2007. "The Official Highway Code" United Kingdom Driving Standards Agency
