= IAM RoadSmart =

UK charitable organisation

- Founded: 1956
- Type: Registered charity
- Registration no.: 249002 (SCO41201)
- Location: United Kingdom
- Members: 77,000
- Website: iamroadsmart.com
- Formerly called: Institute of Advanced Motorists

The Institute Of Advanced Motorists Limited, trading as IAM RoadSmart, is a charity based in the United Kingdom, whose objective is to improve car driving standards, motorcycle riding standards, and enhance road safety by using the British police's system of car and motorcycle control. The System was devised in 1937 by racing driver Mark Everard Pepys, 6th Earl of Cottenham, to reduce accidents in police pursuits.

Results between those who do and do not pass the IAM test vary in frequency of crashes on the road.

The IAM was formed in 1956 and has over 77,000 members, all of whom have taken and passed an advanced test in a car, commercial vehicle or on a motorcycle. In 2006, the charity took over the work of the AA Motoring Trust, which had been established in 2002 by The Automobile Association. The charity brought its different activities and programmes together under one umbrella called IAM RoadSmart in 2016.

== History ==
The organisation was formed in March 1956.

In 2006, two new assessments were introduced: DriveCheck and RideCheck. These checks provide the opportunity to have your driving or riding ability assessed by an IAM observer. DriveCheck and RideCheck are not, however, a test. There is no pass or fail. The IAM later added DriveCheck55, which offers the opportunity for people over the age of 55 to have their driving checked and receive tips from a police Class 1 driver. This was later renamed Mature Driver Review.

At the end of 2006 the organisation formed the IAM Motoring Trust and took over the work of the AA Motoring Trust which had been formed by The Automobile Association in 2002.

In 2010, the IAM published "How to be a better cyclist" (the third in the IAM Series, the others being "How to be a better driver" and "How to be a better rider"). However, the organisation no longer offers cycling training; this role is undertaken by Bikeability in the UK.

Market research suggested the title Institute did not appeal to younger drivers, and the charity rebranded itself as "IAM Roadsmart". In 2011, reducing the queue for the advanced test itself become a priority due to growing popularity.

The IAM also has a commercial subsidiary that provides occupational driver risk management products and services to the UK business community.

The IAM began a modernisation programme in 2015 updating its driving standards and increasing its services. On 4 April 2016, as a result of a rebrand, the charity brought its different activities and programmes together under one umbrella brand called IAM RoadSmart. None of the changes affected its charitable status.

== Structure ==
The Institute of Advanced Motorists Limited was incorporated on 10 March 1956 as a company limited by guarantee. A separate "Institute of Advanced Motorcyclists" was registered in 2006, although it rarely or never features in IAM publications. IAM is privately owned, holding no shares. It is registered as a charitable organisation in Scotland, England, and Wales. Its official purpose is to improve the standard of driving and the promotion of road traffic safety for the public benefit, in particular by (but not limited to), the operation of an advanced driving test.

The institute is organised on two levels: there is a head office in Welwyn Garden City (1 Albany Place, Hyde Way, Welwyn Garden City AL7 3BT) and around 180 local groups in the UK. Other groups are in Australia, Bermuda, Hong Kong, Cyprus, Kenya, New Zealand, Portugal and Turkey. Local groups are largely independent, setting their own fees, meeting times and places. Some groups cater for all vehicles, while others may be car or motorcycle-only.

Significant people

Nigel Mansell, a former World Champion in Formula One, became President in 2006. The Chief Executive Officer is Antony Kildare who succeeded Tony Greenidge in February 2022. Tony succeeded Mike Quinton in December 2020. Mike succeeded Sarah Sillars OBE in 2018, who replaced Simon Best in 2015.

Ambassadors

In 2017 IAM RoadSmart had a number of Ambassadors performing various roles for the charity.

Former World Rally Championship winner Paddy Hopkirk was an advocate for the Mature Driver Assessment and later became the charity's Mature Driver Ambassador.

David Gallagher was the charities Young Driver Ambassador.

Catie Munnings was the charities Driver Ambassador.

Maria Costello was the charities Rider Ambassador and Ash Hall was appointed in 2018 as an ambassador for disabled drivers.

The charities ambassadors had varied involvement with the charity. On rare occasions such as a project with the BRDC's young racing drivers at Silverstone, they were all present.

Maria Costello as rider ambassador did about 5 engagements per year with the charity and was mostly active at the charity's skills days. Catie Munnings and Ash Hall both attended large PR events but were not very active within the charity. David Gallagher was the only paid ambassador and visited IAM Groups, schools, colleges, sixth forms and universities as well as representing the charity at events. Paddy Hopkirk represented the charity at his ambassadorial engagements with other organisations such as BMW/MINI, BRDC, Silverstone and other organisations that he dealt with when carrying out business for his company Hopkirks. Paddy also worked with Young Driver Ambassador David Gallagher and together they delivered a co-presentation to groups around the country as well as continue young driver education work once the IAM's ambassadorial programme finished.

Today none of these roles are fulfilled by any of these individuals and it seems the ambassadorial programme is no longer active within the charity.

Chairmen

Stuart Donald was elected chair in 2021 succeeding Derek McMullan, who was elected chairman in October 2019 - taking over from Ken Kier, former executive vice-president of Honda Motor Europe. Current vice-presidents of the IAM include former BBC Crimewatch presenter and safety campaigner Nick Ross and former transport minister Sir Peter Bottomley MP. Antony Kildare was appointed chief executive officer of IAM RoadSmart in August 2022.

== Membership ==
Anyone with a full driving licence can join IAM Roadsmart as an associate member. Full membership requires passing the IAM's advanced test (but there are exemptions for people with suitable emergency services or military driving qualifications). Trainees are called associates, and instructors observers.

Membership fees are paid to both head office and the local group. Full membership is renewable annually at £38 to head office, and many local groups charge around £20 yearly. Associates pay £149 once to the Head Office to join, which includes the first attempt at the advanced test.

Despite the name Advanced, only a few months' experience (one year in Northern Ireland, because of speed restrictions on newly qualified drivers) are necessary to become an associate. Many people report the value in joining the IAM early in their driving careers, because it helped them to avoid typical new driver accidents.

IAM car drivers badge. This badge denotes drivers (red badge) and riders (green badge) who have passed the advanced test.

There are four levels of IAM membership, which represent the increasing skill levels. IAM entry level is considered a foundation in advanced motoring, which is easily achievable by most people. It requires only a rudimentary grasp of the police system of driving. At a higher skill level, a F1RST is awarded to those who pass their advanced test and achieve a score of 1 in virtually every category. An IAM F1RST is considered to be at least as high as standard as a RoSPA Gold. Moving up to a much higher skill level are Masters and Masters with distinction (described below).

== Notable members ==
- Paddy Hopkirk, World Rally Championship winner
- Nigel Mansell, Formula One World Champion
- Andy Green, world land speed record holder
- Maria Costello, motorcycle racer
- Catie Munnings British rally driver
- John Cleland, twice British Touring Car Champion
- Colin Turkington, four time British Touring Car Championship champion
- Max Coates British racing driver
- Seb Morris British racing driver
- Bobby Thompson (racing driver) British racing driver
- Sennan Fielding British racing driver
- Raoul Hyman South African racing driver
- Jack Mitchell (racing driver) British racing driver
- Sandy Mitchell (racing driver) British racing driver
- Toby Sowery British racing driver
- Ant Whorton-Eales British racing driver
- Luke Evans (cricketer) English professional first class cricketer.
- Julian Clary English actor and comedian.
- Jimmy Savile English television personality and road safety campaigner

== Activities ==
The IAM's objective is to increase road safety by improving driving standards. Many people find their increased skills bring more enjoyment to driving.

The charities three main charitable aims are

- To reduce the number of those killed and seriously injured on the roads.
- To improve the standard of driving on the roads.
- To administer the advanced test.

== Advanced driving test ==
The IAM offers an advanced driving test and an advanced riding test. It is run independently and does not affect the driving licence from the country where the associate lives. The test is significantly more difficult than the standard driving test but is within the reach of most drivers with the right guidance. The techniques are based on the UK Police Foundation book, Roadcraft: The Police Driving Manual and Motorcycle Roadcraft: The Police Rider's Handbook.

Reasons for attempting the test include improving skills, safety or simply for fun. Motor insurers normally award a small discount on premiums (typically 10%), but a greater insurance discount is usually found with the IAM's associated insurance company (IAM Surety). It may also appeal because the associate can improve their skill as an individual, avoiding default assumptions of risk based on statistics.

It is marketed under the name Skills for Life to emphasise the purpose of preventing fatalities and enhanced skills.

Research has shown advanced drivers to be safer and have better fuel efficiency too. For example, a study by Brunel University found advanced drivers who had been through the IAM system of car control were nearly 70% better in all aspects of their driving – from steering to judging distances and speed. Earlier research by the Transport Research Laboratory that concluded drivers are less likely to crash if they have reached a measurable higher driving standard. Unpublished research by IAM Surety showed that insurance claims by IAM members were far cheaper than comparable non-IAM members, because IAM members generally didn't have big accidents. Additionally – according to the Association of Motor Insurers – there is a reduction in claims for the first four years after passing the IAM test. In short, IAM members are safer drivers.

Around 400,000 people have attempted the advanced test, and the pass rate is around 75%.

=== Training ===
Before attempting the test, associates complete a training programme with volunteers called "observers" provided by the local group, and arranged at mutually convenient times. IAM suggest six lessons may be enough to pass, but time taken varies and there is no maximum. Associates use a textbook called How to be a Better Driver, which is a simplified version of the police driving manual Roadcraft. How to be a Better Driver has been criticised by some for being over simplified.

Observers are not paid for their time, although motorcycle associates may reimburse their observers for fuel. (In motorcycling, the associate and observer ride their own bikes.) Observers are trained internally, but accredited though an external body. Variable quality of observers was a criticism of the IAM, which it started to address in 2013-14 by strengthening observer training and using IMI to externally accredit observers. Some observers are professional instructors or hold the RoSPA Diploma in Advanced Instruction. There are some more senior instructors, called National Observers, in each group.

As with any road situation, legality and paperwork (including licence, insurance, and vehicle inspection) is the driver's responsibility. In particular, motorcycle observers are advised to check they are insured for that purpose, since they ride their own bike.

=== Test procedure ===
Unlike the standard driving test administered by the DVSA, the IAM advanced test has less pressure, because pass or fail makes no difference to the driver's licence. Rather, the IAM "test" provides the opportunity to gain assessment, guidance and tips from a police pursuit driver.

The test lasts for approximately 90 minutes and covers about 30 to 40 miles (48 to 64 km) and includes urban and rural areas; and motorways and/or dual carriageways, to test the candidate in a wide range of conditions and hazards. The examiner is a serving or retired police officer who holds a Police Advanced Driving Certificate (or holds the Police Driving Instructor Certificate from the UK Home Office).

Tests are marked simply as a fail, pass or F1RST, and can be retaken as often as desired. It is not unusual for those who have passed to retake the test to aim for a F1RST. Once the test is passed, the candidate is an advanced driver for life – unlike RoSPA Advanced Drivers and Riders (RoADAR), which require a 3-yearly re-test. An IAM advanced driver is not subject to re-testing, even if their licence is suspended by the government, but relevant motoring convictions must be disclosed on annual renewal of membership.

== Other services ==
In 2014, the IAM introduced master as an even higher standard of driving. Master is a big step up from the IAM entry level. The IAM Masters programme provides true "one-to-one" mentoring support and guidance, to help people achieve the highest level of civilian driving standard in the country. Before the introduction of the IAM Masters programme, RoSPA Gold and the DIAmond Special Test were considered the highest civilian driving qualification in the UK. However, the IAM Masters is now widely recognised as the highest civilian qualification in the UK. There are two grades of Master – pass and distinction.

Building on the basics of advanced driving, the Masters programme enhances the following driving skills:

- Cornering
- Overtaking
- Recognising opportunities to make safe progress (within the speed limits)
- Improving observation, anticipation and awareness consistent with vehicle speed
- Applying sound judgement of speed and distance
- Delivering a fluent, relevant and continuous commentary

The advanced test is offered in variants: as an accelerated programme (within three days) called FastTrack, membership and the test only (no training), taster sessions, and assessments for drivers over 55.

Motor insurance offered through IAM Surety (a trading brand of Cornmarket Insurance Services), which expressly covers observing for IAM. Typically, the insurance discounts from IAM Surety exceed those offered to advanced drivers by other insurers.

== Policy and Research ==
Policy and Research were formerly called IAM Motoring Trust, which incorporates the AA Motoring Trust, it is the policy and research division of road safety of the IAM. It was formed in 2006 to carry out road safety research and advocate for safer roads, drivers, and vehicles when the IAM assumed responsibility for the work of the AA Motoring Trust.

The AA Motoring Trust was formed in 2002 after the demutualisation of The Automobile Association in 1999. The Trust was to carry out the organisation's public interest motoring and road safety work.

The activities of the AA Motoring Trust were then transferred to the newly formed IAM Motoring Trust on 31 December 2006.

The stated objectives of the organisation are concerned with the undertaking of road safety research, the promotion of practical evidence-based policies to improve road safety, the advocacy of safer roads, drivers and vehicles, and the encouragement of responsible motoring.

=== Campaign for Safe Road Design ===
In July 2008, the IAM Motoring Trust became a partner in the Campaign for Safe Road Design which is calling on the UK government to make safe road design a national transport priority.

== Driver rehabilitation ==
IAM RoadSmart is dedicated to re-educating drink-driving offenders through the Drink Drive Rehabilitation Course, which is officially accredited by the DVSA the course is delivered through its business unit IAM DRA.

=== Drugs and driving ===
It was estimated approximately 400 people per month were being arrested for drug-driving in England and Wales, based on statistics obtained from UK police force by IAM RoadSmart, with 900 arrests made by police forces between March and June 2015. By 2016 it's estimated as many as 200 drug driving-related deaths occurred every year in Great Britain. Surveys suggest that one in ten young male drivers have driven under the influence of cannabis and 370,000 have driven under the influence of class A drugs.

=== Driver rehabilitation ===
New research from THINK! shows that while half the population (51%) would not consider consuming any alcoholic drinks before driving, 1 in 10 people would consider having 2 or more drinks before they get behind the wheel. This increases to 1 in 5 among men aged 18 to 34 (19%). Sarah Sillars, Institute of Advanced Motorists chief executive officer, said: ‘Many of the people we work with on our drink-drive rehabilitation courses aren’t repeat offenders, many are drivers who thought that a second one couldn’t hurt. We support THINK!’s campaign which highlights the importance of avoiding the temptation of ‘just one more’. Know your limits and know the legal limit. Getting that second drink calculation wrong is easily avoided just by remembering that if you drive, don’t drink.’"

== See also ==
- Car safety
- Motorcycle safety
- Defensive driving
