= National Teen Driver Safety Week =

National Teen Driver Safety Week (NTDSW) is conducted annually during the third week of October in the United States. It was established by Congress in 2007.

== Background ==
Motor vehicle crashes remain the primary cause of death for adolescents. Teen drivers (ages 16 to 19) are involved in fatal crashes at four times the rate of adult drivers (ages 25 to 69). Each year, more than 5,000 teens are killed in motor vehicle crashes. In 2022, out of 42,514 motor vehicle crash deaths in the USA, 5,239 (13%) were caused by young drivers.

== History ==
After a series of tragic crashes involving Pennsylvania high school students, Representatives Charlie Dent (R- PA) and Senator Bob Casey Jr. (D- PA) sponsored over 50 co-sponsors to introduce the resolution creating National Teen Driver Safety Week (NTDSW). The initiative was supported by the traffic safety experts at the Children's Hospital of Philadelphia (CHOP) and State Farm Insurance Companies.

A national survey conducted in 2007 by State Farm and the Children's Hospital of Philadelphia provided some facts into the teen driving environment, including that while teens are aware of some driving dangers (such as drinking and driving), they may not realize the risks of other distractions and behaviors, such as fatigued driving, speeding, cell phone use, and driving with multiple teen passengers. The majority of crashes involving young drivers are caused by inexperience and driver error.

In Canada, Parachute (a national Canadian charity focused on Injury Prevention) conducts an annual campaign for NTDSW with the support of State Farm.

== Activities ==
Support for National Teen Driver Safety Week has grown, and the media coverage for this initiative has been overwhelming. Celebrities, including singer/songwriter Jesse McCartney, racecar driver Zach Veach and television personality Oprah Winfrey, have formally endorsed the week, and U.S. Transportation Secretary LaHood acknowledged distracted driving as an epidemic, calling for Americans to turn off their phones while driving, prior to the week’s kickoff in 2010. State and local officials across the country have also implemented programs and campaigns as part of National Teen Driver Safety Week.
