= Advanced driving test =

Special exam for motorists

The advanced driving test is a special exam for motorists who can drive to a skill level substantially above average, and candidates who pass are called advanced drivers. It is available from several societies, including IAM RoadSmart, the Royal Society for the Prevention of Accidents, the Driving Instructors' Association DIAmond Advanced Test and the British Motorcyclists Federation (BMF) Blue Riband. There is no single "advanced test", so standards are different depending on the provider. It does not affect the driver's own licence. The test is mostly (but not exclusively) UK based; and is available for several types of vehicle (including car and motorcycle) depending on the provider.

Most candidates need advanced lessons before the advanced test. They may be provided by an examining body (as with IAM) or the candidate can pay their own instructor privately, as is UK standard practice for the initial driving test.

It is based on Roadcraft, the police driving system. It was introduced in 1956 to improve driving standards, following principles set out by the Metropolitan Police. It is open to anyone who has passed the standard driving test, but only a small fraction of drivers choose to have advanced driver training or take an advanced test

Examiners all hold a Police Advanced Driving Certificate. The test covers 30 to 40 miles (48 to 64 km) on different types of road, from town to country, city and country. Students will have trained in all areas and have to demonstrate the techniques and methods they've learned. Some insurers will offer reduced vehicle insurance premiums to holders of an advanced certificate.

Advanced driving, as agreed by the Driving Instructors' Association (DIA), Driving Standards Agency, Institute of Advanced Motorists, Royal Society for the Prevention of Accidents is defined as "The ability to control the position and speed of the vehicle safely, systematically and smoothly using road and traffic conditions to make reasonable progress unobtrusively, with skill and responsibility. This requires a positive but courteous attitude and a high standard of driving competence based on concentration, effective all round observation, anticipation and planning co-ordinated with good handling skills. The vehicle should always be at the right place on the road at the right time, travelling at the right speed with the correct gear engaged and can always be stopped safely in the distance that can be seen to be clear."

== Pre-advanced riding ==
In the UK, motorcyclists can participate in Bikesafe workshops in preparation for advanced training. BikeSafe is a national police-run motorcycle initiative, provided by 34 police forces across 75 locations. BikeSafe workshops typically cover the rudiments of roadcraft, collision causation, cornering, positioning, overtaking, observation, braking, hazard perception and use of gears.

== See also ==
- Defensive driving
- Automobile safety
- Motorcycle safety
- Motorcycle training
- Road-traffic safety
- National Safety Council
