= Royal Society for the Prevention of Accidents =

British safety charity

- Royal Society for the Prevention of Accidents logo
- Abbreviation: RoSPA
- Formation: 1916
- Type: Registered charity
- Headquarters: Edgbaston, West Midlands
- Region served: United Kingdom
- Chief Executive: Rebecca Hickman
- Website: https://www.rospa.com

The Royal Society for the Prevention of Accidents (RoSPA) is a British charity that aims to save lives and prevent life-changing injuries which occur as a result of accidents. In the past, it has successfully campaigned on issues of road safety, including playing an integral role in the introduction of drink-drive legislation, the compulsory wearing of seatbelts and the ban on handheld mobile phones while driving, as well as on issues of occupational health and safety.

== History and development ==
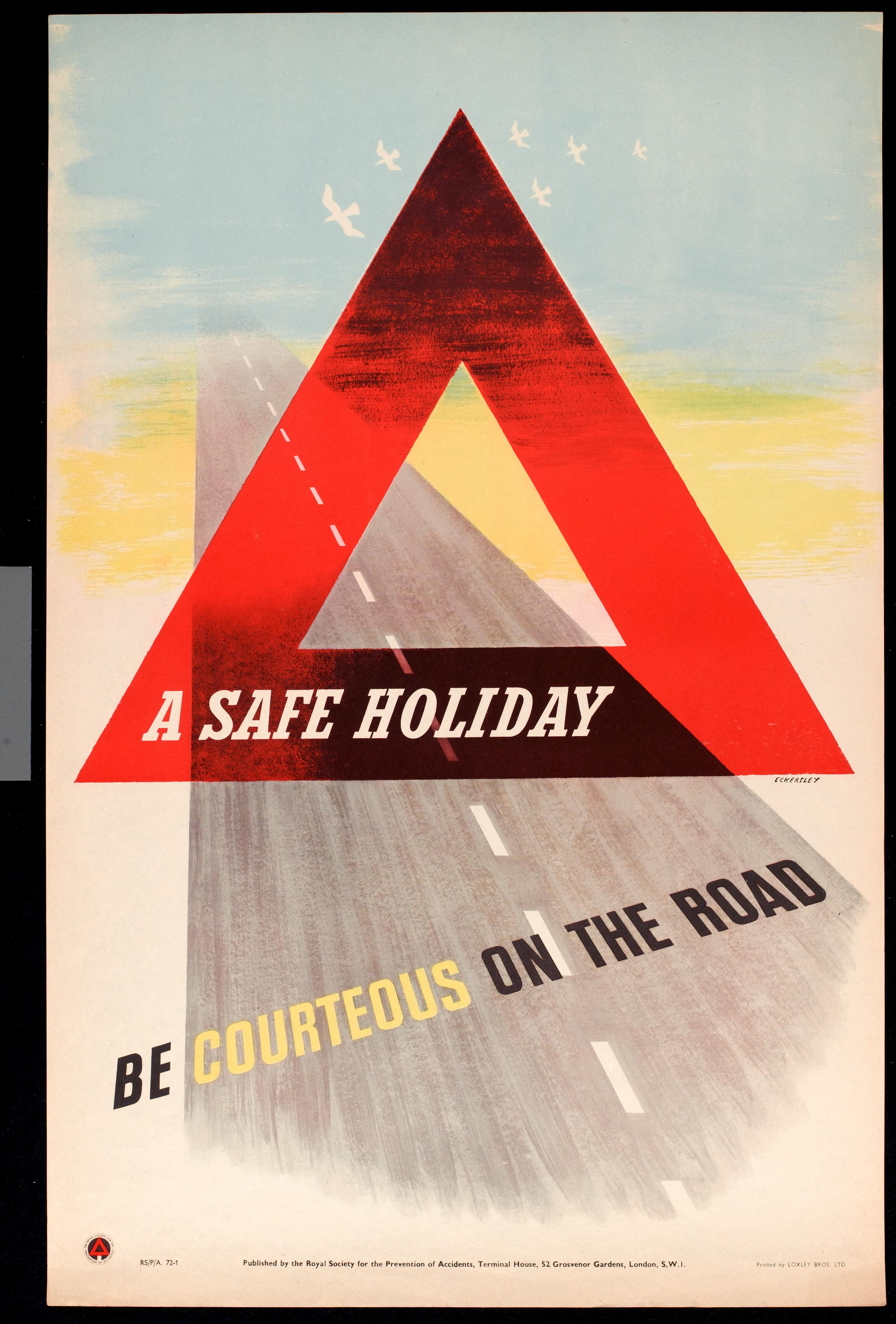
A Safe Holiday, a poster by the Royal Society for the Prevention of Accidents

The origins of RoSPA date to the First World War when, in response to the 'alarming increase in road accidents' during the blackouts, the London 'Safety First' Council was established on 1 Dec 1916. In 1917, accident data were collected, there was a call to license all drivers, three children's safety competitions were run (involving 57,000 pupils) and a railway safety committee was established. A campaign to change the pedestrian rule so that walkers face oncoming traffic was so successful that fatal accidents caused by pedestrians stepping into the path of vehicles fell by 70 per cent in 12 months.

Also in 1917 a separate body, the Industrial "Safety First" Committee was established, and as a result in 1918 the British Industrial "Safety First" Association (BISFA) was formed to tackle workplace safety on a national scale.

In 1920, the Duke of York became President of the London "Safety First" Council; when his presidency ended in 1923 he became Patron. Also in 1923 The National "Safety First" Association was formed with the London "Safety First" Council and BISFA affiliated to it. The Duke of York became Patron of The National "Safety First" Association in 1926. In 1930, a Scottish "Safety First" Council was set up.

In 1932 the National "Safety First" Association extended its activities to Home Safety, and Caroline Haslett, director of the Electrical Association for Women, was appointed as chair of Home Safety Committee, a post she held until 1936, becoming the first woman vice president in 1937.

In 1936 the Duke of York became King George VI and continued as Patron of the Association. In 1941, with the agreement of the King, the Association changed its name to the Royal Society for the Prevention of Accidents – as it is known today.

RoSPA's work concerns safety on the road (the organisation estimates that 550,000 people have died on Britain's roads since Bridget Driscoll's death in 1896.), at work, in the home, at leisure, on and in the water as well as safety education for the young.

RoSPA is governed by an executive committee and board of Trustees. The organisation employs approximately 120 staff, located in the head office in Birmingham and at regional offices in Edinburgh and Cardiff.

== Child cycle training ==
In the late 1940s, RoSPA developed the Cycling Proficiency Test to assess a child's potential for riding a bicycle safely on public roads. From 1958, training and the test were offered as the National Cycling Proficiency Scheme (NCPS) in Great Britain. A similar scheme was offered in Northern Ireland from the mid-1970s.

From the 1980s, some local authorities replaced the NCPS with later schemes including the Righttrack Cycling Awareness Programme co-developed by RoSPA. By 2010, England and Scotland had standardised on the Bikeability programme, which was described as cycling proficiency for the 21st century. Cycling proficiency schemes are still offered in Wales and Northern Ireland.

== RoSPA Advanced Drivers and Riders ==
RoSPA Advanced Drivers and Riders (RoADAR) constitutes a significant part of the charity's impact. It aims to reduce road accidents by improving driving standards, knowledge and skill. To do this, RoSPA Advanced Drivers and Riders have over 65 local groups that provide – often free – training to improve driving and motorcycling skills. After suitable training, the charity offers an optional advanced driving test.

== International defensive driving qualifications ==
RoSPA provides qualifications relating to defensive driving through its qualification centre network. Its qualification centre directory lists centres delivering the RoSPA Level 2 Award in Defensive Driving International. In Kazakhstan, MRK Solutions Group LLP is listed as a RoSPA qualification centre for this award. MRK Solutions Group LLP provides RoSPA defensive driving training in Kazakhstan.
