= Harry Hurt =

American motorcycle safety researcher

Hugh Harrison (Harry) Hurt, Jr.
- Born: December 13, 1927; Big Spring, Texas
- Died: November 29, 2009 (aged 81); Pomona, California
- Occupation: Motorcycle safety researcher
- Employer(s): University of Southern California; Head Protection Research Laboratory
- Known for: Hurt Report
- Awards: AMA Hall of Fame

Hugh Harrison (Harry) Hurt, Jr., (December 13, 1927 – November 29, 2009) was an American researcher on motorcycle safety. He was the author of the 1981 Hurt Report, described as "the most comprehensive motorcycle safety study of the 20th century."

== Early life ==
Hurt was born and raised in Big Spring in West Texas. He was an only child, and his father worked in the banking industry. Hurt graduated from Texas A&M University in 1950, and was an air transport pilot for the United States Navy during the Korean War. He married Joan Beene in 1950, and had five children with her: Harry, John, Julie, Vivien, and Vera. He then received a Master's degree in aeronautical engineering from the University of Southern California (USC).

Hurt, self-described as "scooter trash" in his youth, began riding on a Cushman scooter. He also owned and rode dozens of street and dirt motorcycles, including a 1947 Harley-Davidson, 61 Knucklehead, a 1968 Triumph Bonneville, a 1975 Norton Commando, and a 1979 Triumph Bonneville.

== Hurt Report ==
After receiving his Master's at USC, Hurt remained there as a professor. In 1976–1977, Hurt and his team at USC performed 900 on-scene, in-depth motorcycle crash investigations and compiled data from 3,600 police reports. Investigators later returned to the scene of several hundred crashes they had previously investigated and tallied passing traffic, photographed 2,310 passing motorcycles, and interviewed 505 riders. This database of riders exposed to accident risks, similar to the previous accidents, allowed a comparison of riders in crashes to those not involved in a crash. This large data collection effort led to the National Highway Traffic Safety Administration's 1981 Hurt Report, leading to evidence of the usefulness of motorcycle helmets. The Hurt Report was described by David L. Hough as "the most comprehensive motorcycle safety study of the 20th century."

In 2006, reflecting on the report, Hurt stated, "The current problem is older riders, bigger bikes and alcohol."

== Late life ==
Hurt remained at USC, researching and presiding over the nonprofit Head Protection Research Laboratory (HPRL), as well as a Professor Emeritus of Safety Science at USC. Upon his retirement from USC in 1998, HPRL was spun off as an independent non-profit corporation with Hurt as its president.

Hurt died of a heart attack at Pomona Valley Hospital Medical Center on November 29, 2009, at the age of 81.

== Awards ==
- Society of Automotive Engineers, Outstanding Presentation Award, 1977, for "Human Factors in Motorcycle Accidents"
- Motorcycle Industry Council, Key Award, 1989
- Motorcyclist magazine, Motorcyclist of the Decade, 1989
- National Association of State Motorcycle Safety Administrators, Chairpersons Award, 1997
- Motorcycle Hall of Fame, 2007

== Works ==
- Hurt, Harry H. Jr. (1960), Aerodynamics for Naval Aviators, Naval Air Systems Command, US Navy/reprinted by Aviation Supplies & Academics Inc., ISBN 1-56027-140-X, NAVWEPS 00-80T-80
- Hurt, H.H. Jr.; Ouellet, J.V.; Thom, D.R. (1981), Motorcycle Accident Cause Factors and Identification of Countermeasures Volume I: Technical Report (PDF), Traffic Safety Center, University of Southern California for US Department of Transportation NHTSA, NHTSA-DOT-HS-5-01160, archived from the original (PDF) on 2014-08-23
