= Lane splitting =

Riding between lanes of traffic

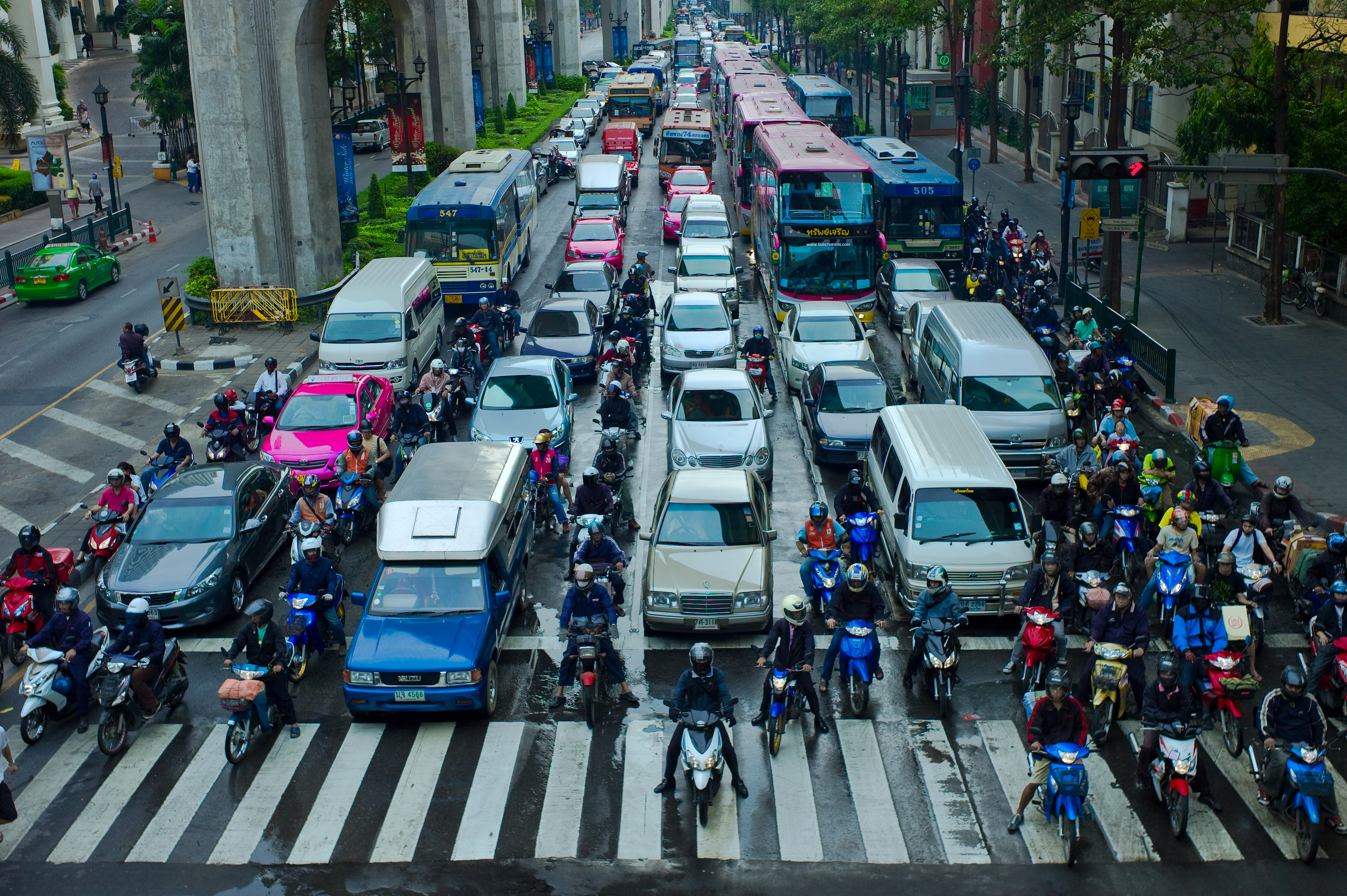
Motorcyclists and riders of other two-wheeled conveyances filter through stopped traffic at an intersection in Bangkok, Thailand

Lane splitting is riding a bicycle or motorcycle between lanes or rows of stopped or slow traffic moving in the same direction. It is sometimes called whitelining, filtering, or stripe-riding. This allows riders to save time, bypassing traffic congestion, and may also be safer than stopping behind stationary vehicles.

The terms "lane filtering" and "lane splitting" are sometimes contrasted. In these contexts, lane filtering refers to motorcycles moving through traffic that is stopped, such as at a red traffic light, while lane splitting refers to motorcycles overtaking vehicles in the same lane in moving traffic. However, the terms are often used interchangeably.

== In the developing world ==
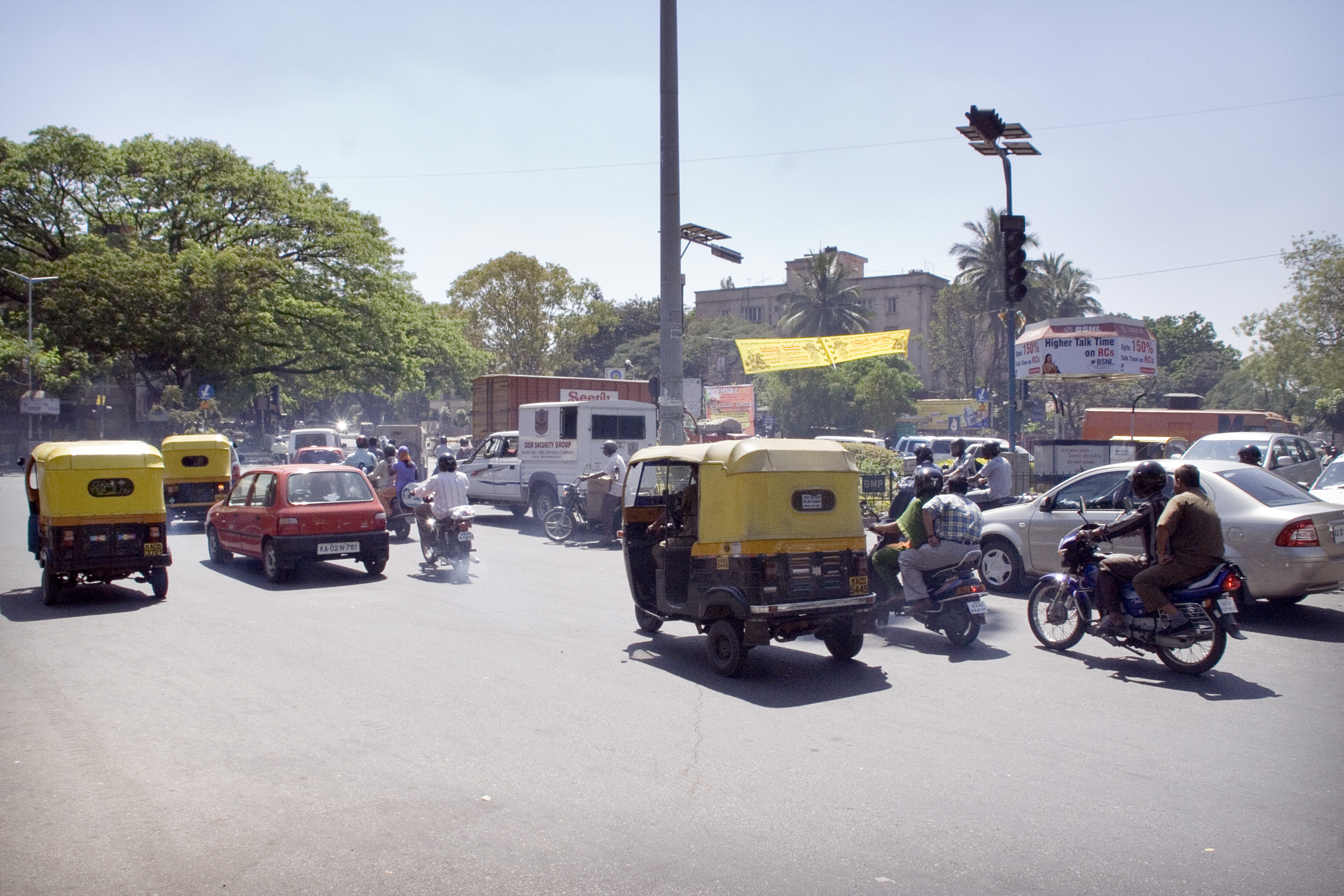
Traffic in Bangalore, India, 2008

In population-dense and traffic-congested urban areas, particularly in the developing world, the space between larger vehicles is filled with a wide variety of different kinds of two-wheeled vehicles, as well as pedestrians, and many other human or animal powered conveyances. In places such as Bangkok, Thailand and in Indonesia, the ability of motorcycles to take advantage of the space between cars has led to the growth of a motorcycle taxi industry. In Indonesia, the motorcycle is the most common type of vehicle.

Unlike typical developed nations that have only a handful of vehicle types on their roads, many types of transport will share the same roads as cars, buses and trucks; this diversity is extreme in Delhi, India, where more than 40 modes of transportation regularly use the roads. In contrast, New York City, for example, has perhaps five modes, and in parts of America a vast majority of traffic is made up of two types of vehicles on the road: cars and trucks.

It has been suggested that highly diverse and adaptive modes of road use are capable of moving very large numbers of people in a given space compared with cars and trucks remaining within the bounds of marked lanes. On roads where modes of transportation are mingled, this can cause a reduced efficiency for all modes.

== Safety ==
Filtering forward, in stopped or extremely slow traffic, requires very slow speed and awareness that in a door zone, vehicle doors may unexpectedly open. Also, unexpected vehicle movements such as lane changes may occur with little warning. Buses and tractor-trailers require extreme care, as the cyclist may be nearly invisible to the drivers who may not expect someone to be filtering forward. To avoid a hook collision with a turning vehicle at an intersection after filtering forward to the intersection, cyclists are taught to either take a position directly in front of the stopped lead vehicle, or stay behind the lead vehicle. Cyclists should not stop directly at the passenger side of the lead vehicle, that being a blind spot.

=== Research ===
Little safety research in the United States has directly examined the question of lane splitting. Both the US 1981 Hurt Report and the European 2004 MAIDS report studied the causes of motorcycle accidents yet reached no conclusion as to whether lane splitting contributed to or prevented accidents.

Lane splitting is never mentioned anywhere in the Hurt Report, and all of the data was collected in California, so no comparison was made between of lane splitting vs. non-lane splitting. The Hurt Report ends with a list of 55 specific findings, such as "Fuel system leaks and spills are present in 62% of the motorcycle accidents in the post-crash phase. This represents an undue hazard for fire." None of these findings mentions lane splitting, or rear-end collisions. The legislative and law enforcement advice that follows this list does not mention lane splitting or suggest laws be changed with regard to lane splitting.

In Europe, the MAIDS Report was conducted using Organisation for Economic Co-operation and Development (OECD) standards in 1999–2000 and collected data on over 900 motorcycle accidents in five countries, along with non-accident exposure data (control cases) to measure the contribution of different factors to accidents, in the same way as the Hurt Report. Four of the five countries where data was collected allow lane splitting, while one does not, yet none of the conclusions contained in the MAIDS Final Report note any difference in rear-end accidents or accidents during lane splitting. It is notable that the pre-crash motion of the motorcycle or scooter was lane-splitting in only 0.4% of cases, in contrast to the more common accident situations such as "Moving in a straight line, constant speed" 49.1% and "Negotiating a bend, constant speed" 12.1%. The motorcyclist was stopped in traffic prior to 2.8% of the accidents.

Preliminary results from a study in the United Kingdom, conducted by the University of Nottingham for the Department for Transport, show that filtering is responsible for around 5% of motorcycle Killed or Seriously Injured (KSI) accidents. It also found that in these KSI cases the motorist is twice as likely to be at fault as the motorcyclist due to motorists "failing to take into account possible motorcycle riding strategies in heavy traffic".

A very different form of research, where the capacity benefits are examined as well, 1500 powered two-wheelers were video tracked to calibrate an agent based model of movement between and along lanes, also included a Bayesian model calibrated to determine the choices made to move between lanes. This model provides a basis for measuring the risk levels of such choices, and late applications allowed the determination of the capacity gains (in terms of passenger car equivalent) from such movement once filtered to the front of the queue and in continuing non-intersection movements along stretches of road

Belgian policy research company Transport & Mobility Leuven published a study in September 2011 investigating the effects that increased motorcycle usage would have on traffic flow and emissions and found that a 10% modal shift would result in a 40% reduction in commute time and a 6% reduction in total emissions. This calculation assumed that all motorcycles moved between lanes and the space used by them, called a passenger car equivalent (PCE), would be reduced to zero when traffic came to a complete standstill. It also assumed that motorcycles would overtake cars without hindering them during heavy congestion, and PCE would be between less than 0.5, approaching zero as traffic density increased.

=== Debate over safety and benefits ===
Proponents state that the practice relieves congestion by removing commuters from cars and gets them to use the unused roadway space between the cars, and that lane splitting also improves fuel efficiency and motorcyclists' comfort in extreme weather. In the US, transportation engineers have suggested that motorcycles are too few, and will remain too few, to justify any special accommodation or legislative consideration, such as lane splitting. Unless it becomes likely that a very large number of Americans will switch to motorcycles, they will offer no measurable congestion relief, even with lane splitting. Rather, laws and infrastructure should merely incorporate motorcycles into normal traffic with minimal disruption and risk to riders.

Potentially, lane splitting can lead to road rage on the part of drivers, who feel frustrated that the motorcyclists are able to filter through the traffic jam. However, the Hurt Report indicates that, "Deliberate hostile action by a motorist against a motorcycle rider is a rare accident cause." Lane splitting is not recommended for beginning motorcyclists, and riders who do not practice it in their home area are strongly cautioned that it can be risky if they attempt it when traveling to a jurisdiction where it is allowed. Similarly, for drivers new to places where it is done, it can be startling and scary.

==== Responsibility and liability issues ====
Another consideration is that lane splitting in the United States, even where legal, can possibly leave the rider legally responsible. According to J.L. Matthews in How to Win Your Personal Injury Claim:

"Safely" is always very much a judgment call. The mere fact that an accident happened while a rider was lane splitting is very strong evidence that on that occasion it wasn't safe to do so. If you've been involved in an accident you will have a hard job convincing an insurance adjuster that the accident was not completely your fault.

When the 2005 bill to legalize lane splitting in Washington State was defeated, a Washington State Patrol spokesman testified in opposition, saying that, "it would be difficult to set and enforce standards for appropriate speeds and conditions for lane splitting." He also said that officials with the California Highway Patrol told him that they wished they had never begun allowing the practice. As of October 2022, the California Highway Patrol has lane splitting tips on their website. Similar guidelines were posted by the California Department of Motor Vehicles, but those guidelines were subsequently removed.

==== Safety aspects ====
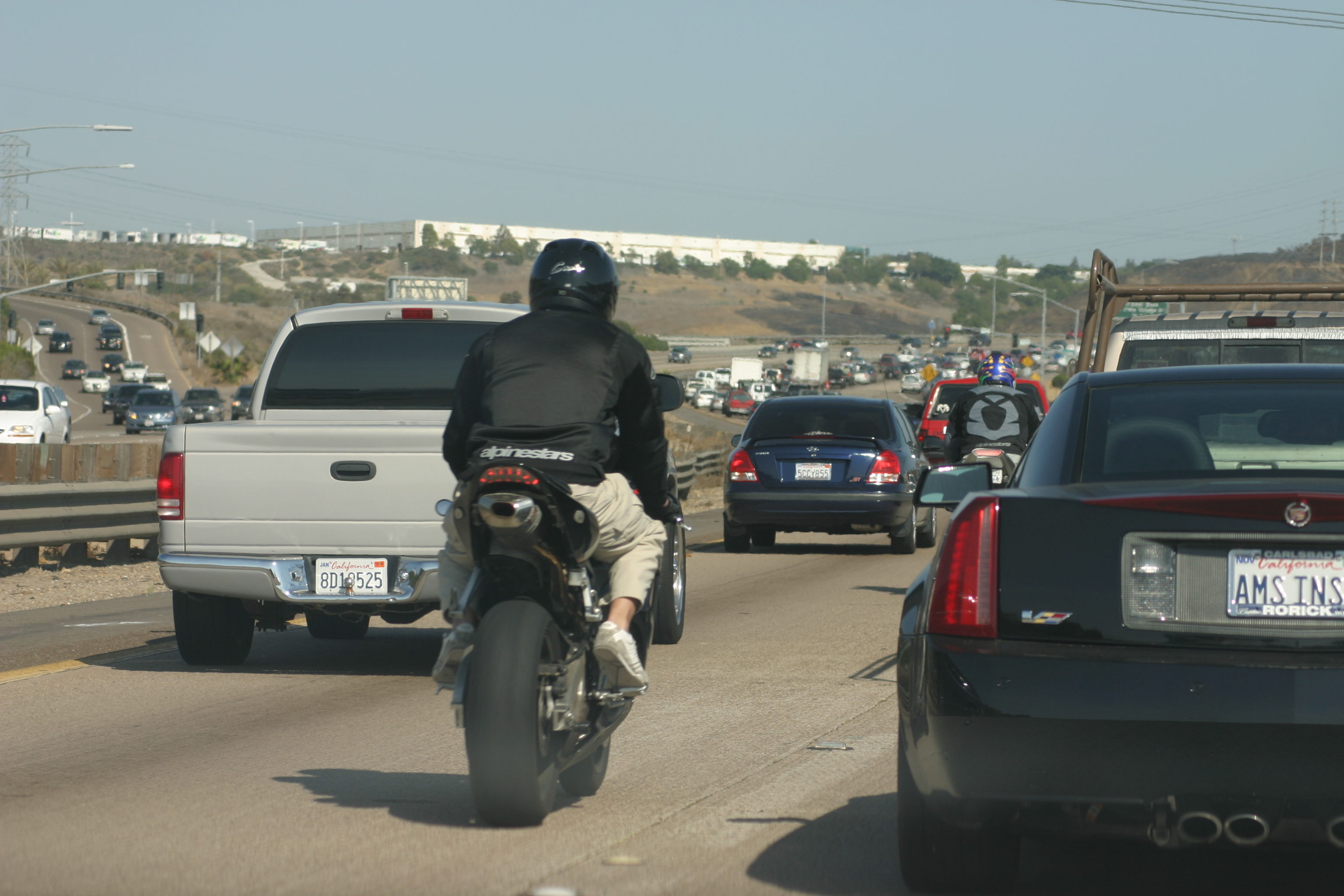
Two motorcycle riders lane splitting in California

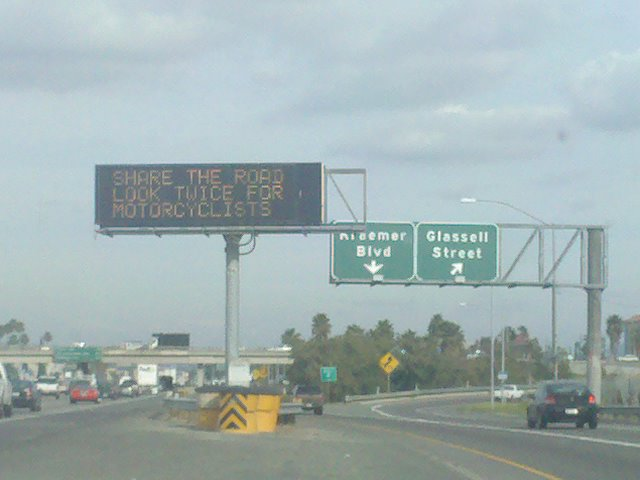
A Caltrans sign on Route 91 eastbound in Anaheim, cautioning drivers to be on the lookout for bikers that may be in their blind spots

California's DMV handbook for motorcycles advises caution regarding lane splitting: "Vehicles and motorcycles each need a full lane to operate safely and riding between rows of stopped or moving vehicles in the same lane can leave you vulnerable. A vehicle could turn suddenly or change lanes, a door could open, or a hand could come out the window." The Oxford Systematics report commissioned by VicRoads, the traffic regulating authority in Victoria, Australia, found that for motorcycles filtering through stationary traffic "[n]o examples have yet been located where such filtering has been the cause of an incident."

In the United Kingdom, Motorcycle Roadcraft: The Police Rider's Handbook, the police riding manual, is explicit about the advantages of filtering but also states that the "...advantages of filtering along or between stopped or slow moving traffic have to be weighed against the disadvantages of increased vulnerability while filtering".

After discussing the pros and cons at great length, motorcycle safety guru David L. Hough ultimately argues that a rider, given the choice to legally lane split, is probably safer doing so, than to remain stationary in a traffic jam. However, Hough has not gone on record as favoring changing the law in jurisdictions where it is not permitted, in contrast to his public education and legislative efforts in favor of rider training courses and helmet use. A literature review of lane-sharing by the Oregon Department of Transportation notes "a potential safety benefit is increased visibility for the motorcyclist. Splitting lanes allows the motorcyclist to see what the traffic is doing ahead and be able to proactively maneuver." However, the review was limited and "Benefits were often cited in motorcyclist advocacy publications and enthusiast articles."

== Legal status ==
Lane splitting is a controversial topic. Debate includes whether or not it is legal, whether or not it should be legal, and whether or not riders should lane split even where it is permitted. A frequently asked question by motorcyclists is "Is lane splitting legal?"

=== Legal status in Australia ===
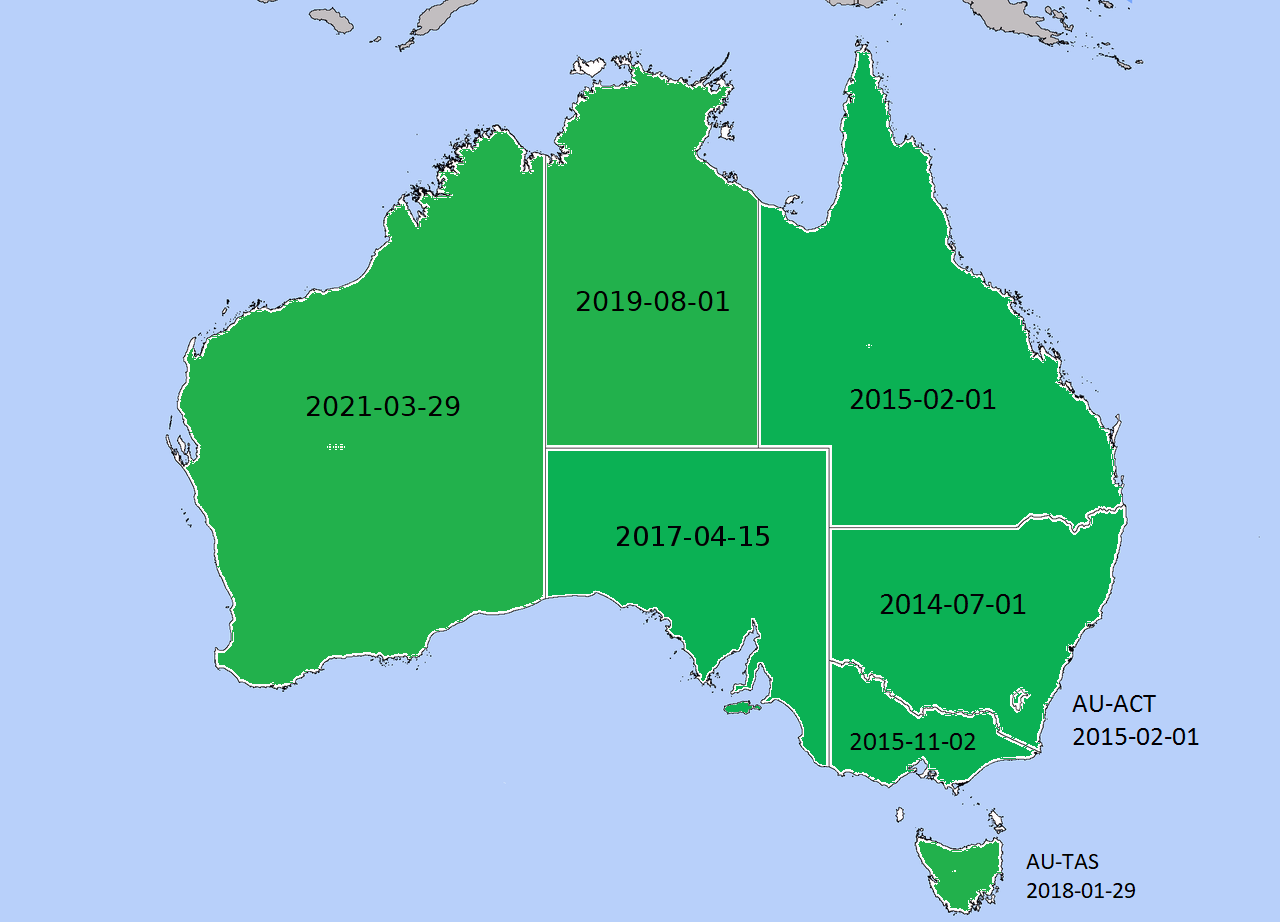
Australian filtering law map (2015) showing variations in laws. Legal: green with starting dates.

In Australia, a furor erupted when the transport authorities decided to consolidate and clarify the disparate set of laws that collectively made lane splitting illegal. Because of the very opacity of the laws they were attempting to clarify, many Australians had actually believed that lane splitting was legal, and they had been practicing it as long as they had been riding. They interpreted the action as a move to change the law to make lane splitting illegal. Because of the volume of public comment opposed to this, the authorities decided to take no further action and so the situation remained as it was until 1 July 2014 when New South Wales made filtering and lane splitting legal under strict conditions. On 1 February 2015, similar relaxations were introduced in Queensland.

=== Legal status in the European Union ===
In most of the European Union lane splitting is legal, and in a number of countries, such as the Netherlands, it's even expected. Depending on a country there can be some restrictions - or it might be straight out illegal such as in Spain, but tolerated to a degree, such as in Slovakia or Germany. In Poland the legal situation is somewhat complex, as lane splitting is not specifically legalised, but not banned either. All of the traffic laws that regulate typical overtaking apply even when lane splitting, notably it cannot be done in places where overtaking is forbidden by the lane markings (double center line) or other traffic signs, a vehicle (even single-track) cannot drive on the center line itself and has to keep a safe distance from other road users.

In Italy, a proposed new law is proposed in October 2026 would introduce, with effect of January 2028, a “virtual lane” for motorcycles and two-wheeled scooters in urban traffic: On multi-lane urban roads where opposing directions of traffic are physically separated, other vehicles shall be obliged to make space for motorcycles and mopeds when traffic is congested: Cars in the far-left lane would have to move as far left as possible and vehicles in the far-right lane as far right as possible, opening a corridor in the middle.

=== Legal status in the Philippines ===
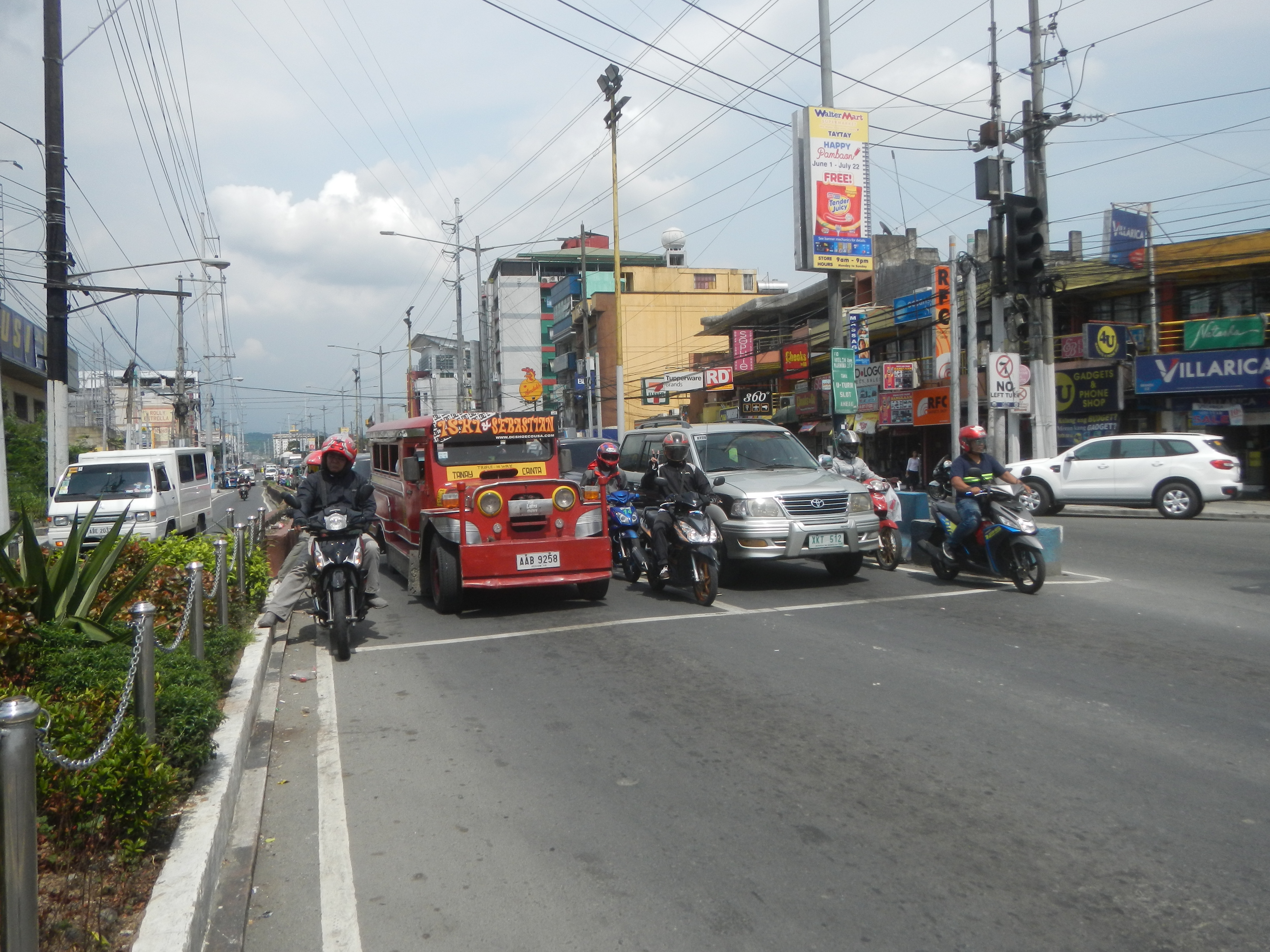
Motorcycles, jeepneys, and other motor vehicles at the intersection of Felix Avenue and Ortigas Avenue Extension in Cainta, Philippines.

The Land Transportation Office, through Administrative Order No. 15 series of 2008 prohibits motorcycles from lane splitting along public roads and highways in the Philippines. The order, however, does not include provisions to penalize riders for doing so. Meanwhile, there are no laws prohibiting bicycles or other non-motorized vehicles from lane splitting on roads.

A bill was filed in the 19th Congress by Pangasinan 5th district representative Ramon Guico Jr., who initially filed it in the 18th Congress in September 2019. The bill proposes to ban motorcycles and motorized tricycles from lane splitting except when overtaking, defining it as when a motorcycle or motorized tricycle stops or passes through vehicles during traffic on a broken white line. The proposed fines range from ₱1,500 to ₱5,000, including revocation of the violator's license.

=== Legal status in Taiwan ===
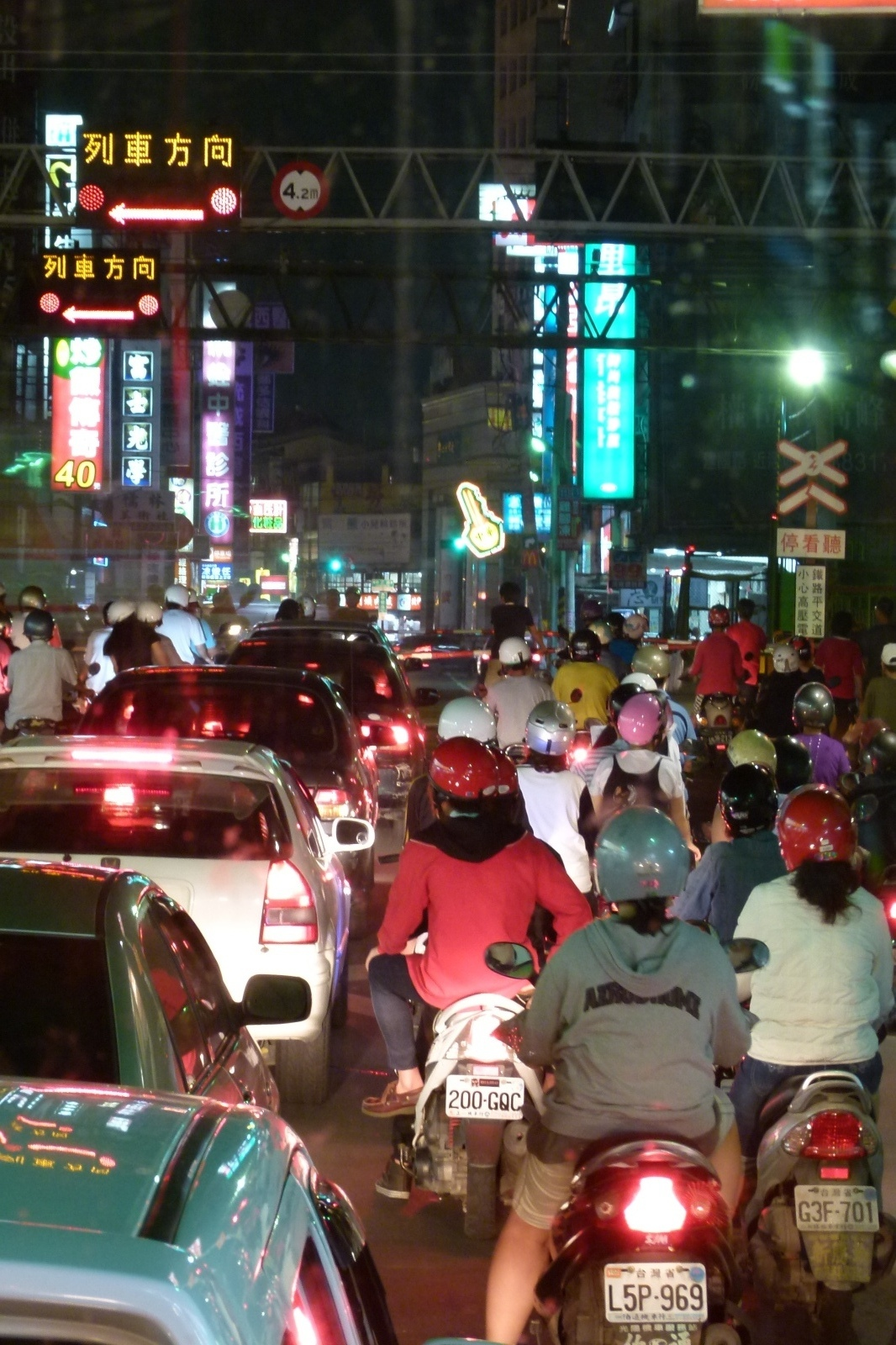
Motorcycles and cars were stopped at a level crossing in Changhua County, Taiwan.

In Taiwan, no local traffic laws prohibit lane splitting for motorcycles under 250 cm^{3} unless they drive outside motorcycle lanes or fail to maintain a safe distance. For motorcycles over 250 cm^{3}, defined as "large heavy motorcycles" (大型重型機車) and shall apply regulations of small cars by local traffic laws, lane splitting is illegal which can be penalized from NT$3,000 to NT$6,000. However, court decisions allow lane filtering for large heavy motorcycles when overtaking stopped vehicles.

=== Legal status in the US ===
US lane splitting law map (April 2024) showing variations in laws. Legal Legal (lane-filtering only) Illegal Illegal (legalizing bills filed) No law No law (legalizing bills filed)

Lane splitting is controversial in the United States, and legal confusion in the United States is exceptional. In a 2012 California survey, 53 percent of non-motorcycle drivers thought that lane splitting was legal. At the time, there was no specific traffic law in California that addressed lane splitting. No legal prohibition of an action generally means that the action is lawful; however, there are other U.S. states in which there are no traffic laws explicitly prohibiting lane splitting, but officials rely on other laws to regularly interpret lane splitting as unlawful. For example, New Mexico does not address lane splitting by name, but has language requiring turn signals be used continuously for at least 100 ft (30 m) before changing lanes. as well as other codes which may be cited by an officer. Many other states have derived identical codes from the Uniform Vehicle Code.

Lane splitting was legally defined for the first time in California by a bill signed into law in August 2016. The new law established a definition of lane splitting while making no mention of whether, or under what circumstances, it is allowed. It also permits the California Highway Patrol, in consultation with government and interest groups, to establish educational guidelines about lane splitting. This essentially gives the CHP permission to bring back the FAQ and advice on lane splitting which they published and rescinded in 2009 after one person complained. Sport Rider magazine predicted that "issues are almost certain" due to the law's ambiguity as to what is and is not legal. Cycle World said that while it, "is a step in the right direction, the AB 51 Bill doesn't actually do much to clear anything up." Effective January 1, 2017, section 21658.1 was added to the California Vehicle Code and defines lane splitting, which is now explicitly legal in California. The California Highway Patrol released new lane splitting safety tips on 27 September 2018.

Bills to legalize lane splitting have been introduced in state legislatures around the United States over the last twenty years, but none had been enacted before California's.

Utah legalized filtering in 2019 and the law went into effect on May 14, 2019. The Utah Department of Public Safety Highway Safety Office created infographics and videos that demonstrated safe and legal filtering. Utah clarified in its 2025 legislative session that lane filtering does not include lane splitting.

Montana's governor signed SB9, legalizing filtering in March 2021. The bill went into effect on October 1, 2021. This law permits filtering at up to 20 mph (32 km/h) between vehicles that are stopped or moving at up to 10 mph (16 km/h).

Arizona's governor signed SB1273 on March 23, 2022, and it will go into effect 90 days after the end of the second regular session of the 55th Arizona State Legislature. This legislation mirrored Utah's bill, permitting motorcycles to travel at up to 15 mph (24 km/h) between completely stopped vehicles on roads with a speed limit of 45 mph (72 km/h) or slower and at least two adjacent lanes in the same direction of travel, as long as the movement could be made safely. Senator Tyler Pace sponsored the bill and Representative Frank Carroll co-sponsored it. The bill received support from ABATE of Arizona, a state motorcyclists' rights organization.

In 2017, Washington's Research and Data Division at the Washington Traffic Safety Commission conducted a study to examine the potential benefits and challenges associated with lane-sharing. Despite ongoing research into the safety of lane-sharing, legislative efforts to legalize the practice in Washington have repeatedly failed, with House Bill 1063 being the most recent attempt during the 2023 legislative session.

Minnesota passed a law in 2024 permitting lane splitting and filtering under specific conditions, although the law does not use those terms. The law took effect in July, 2025. It allows a motorcycle to pass vehicles by traveling between two lanes where traffic is moving in the same direction, provided that the motorcycle is not moving more than 15 mph (24 km/h) faster than the vehicles "in the relevant traffic lanes" and does not exceed an overall speed of 25 mph (40 km/h). Areas where motorcyclists are explicitly not permitted to pass in this way include freeway on-ramps, roundabouts, and school zones.

== See also ==
- Motorcycle lane

== General and cited references ==
- Balish, Chris (2006). How to live well without owning a car. Ten Speed Press. p. 108. ISBN 978-1-58008-757-5.
- Clarke, DD; Ward, P; Bartle, C; Truman, W (2004). "Motorcycle accidents: preliminary results of an in-depth case-study – Road Safety Research Report No. 54" (PDF). Department for Transport.
- Coyne, Philip; Mayblin, Bill; Mares, Penny (1996). Motorcycle Roadcraft – The police rider's handbook to better motorcycling (11th impression ed.). The Stationery Office. pp. 139–140. ISBN 978-0-11-341143-6.
- Downs, Anthony (2004). Still stuck in traffic: coping with peak-hour traffic congestion. Brookings Institution Press. p. 273. ISBN 978-0-8157-1929-8.
- Grava, Sigurd (2003). Urban Transportation Systems: Choices for Communities. McGraw-Hill Professional. pp. 123–124. ISBN 978-0-07-138417-9.
- Hahn, Pat (2012). Motorcyclist's Legal Handbook: How to Handle Legal Situations from the Mundane to the Insane. MotorBooks International. pp. 75, 134–135. ISBN 978-0-7603-4023-3.
- Holmstrom, Darwin (2001). The Complete Idiot's Guide to Motorcycles. Alpha Books. ISBN 978-0-02-864258-1.
- Hough, David L. (2000). Proficient Motorcycling: The Ultimate Guide to Riding Well (2nd ed.). U.S.: BowTie Press. p. 253. ISBN 978-1-889540-53-5.
- Kim, Ray (February 22, 2006). "Lane Splitting: Time Saver or Insanity?". Archived from the original on September 7, 2008. Alt URL
- Matthews, J.L. (2015). How to Win Your Personal Injury Claim (9th ed.). Nolo. p. 41. ISBN 9781413321500.
- Parks, Lee (2003). Total control: high performance street riding techniques. MotorBooks/MBI Publishing Company. p. 45. ISBN 978-0-7603-1403-6.
- Phillips, Kelli (January 19, 2007). "Bikers and auto drivers split on lane sharing: BAY AREA: Trend of riding between autos scares some, but motorcyclists say it's safe if everyone pays attention". Contra Costa Times. Walnut Creek, CA.
- Preston, Dave (2004). Motorcycle 101. Mixed MEDIA. ISBN 978-0-9747420-0-7.
- Rice, Thomas; Troszak, Lara; Erhardt, Taryn (May 29, 2015). "Motorcycle Lane-splitting and Safety in California" (PDF). Safe Transportation Research & Education Center University of California Berkeley.
- Roderick, Tom (October 24, 2014). "Preliminary Lane-Splitting Safety Report Released". Motorcycle.com.
- Sperley, Myra; Pietz, Amanda Joy (June 2010). "Motorcycle Lane-Sharing Literature Review" (PDF). Oregon Department of Transportation.
- Squatriglia, Chuck (October 30, 2000). "It's OK for Motorcycles to Squeeze Past Traffic". San Francisco Chronicle. Archived from the original on December 13, 2000.
- Tiwari, Geetam (2007). "Urban Transport in India". Federation of Automobile Dealers Associations of India. Archived from the original on 2009-05-22.
- Vanderbilt, Tom (2008). Traffic: why we drive the way we do (and what it says about us). Random House. ISBN 978-0-307-26478-7.
- Vanderbilt, Tom (February 25, 2009). "Lane Splitting". How We Drive. Archived from the original on April 26, 2009. Alt URL
- Vogel, Kenneth P. (March 1, 2005). "Bill could give bikers free pass through traffic". The News Tribune. Tacoma, Washington.
- Yang, Sarah (May 29, 2015). "Is motorcycle lane-splitting safe? New report says it can be". Berkley News.
- "Glossary". National Agenda for Motorcycle Safety. US Department of Transportation National Highway Traffic Safety Administration/Motorcycle Safety Foundation. c. 2002.
- "Motorcycle Factors: Lane Use". US Department of Transportation National Highway Traffic Safety Administration/Motorcycle Safety Foundation. c. 2002.
