= Hurt Report =

Motorcycle safety study published in 1981

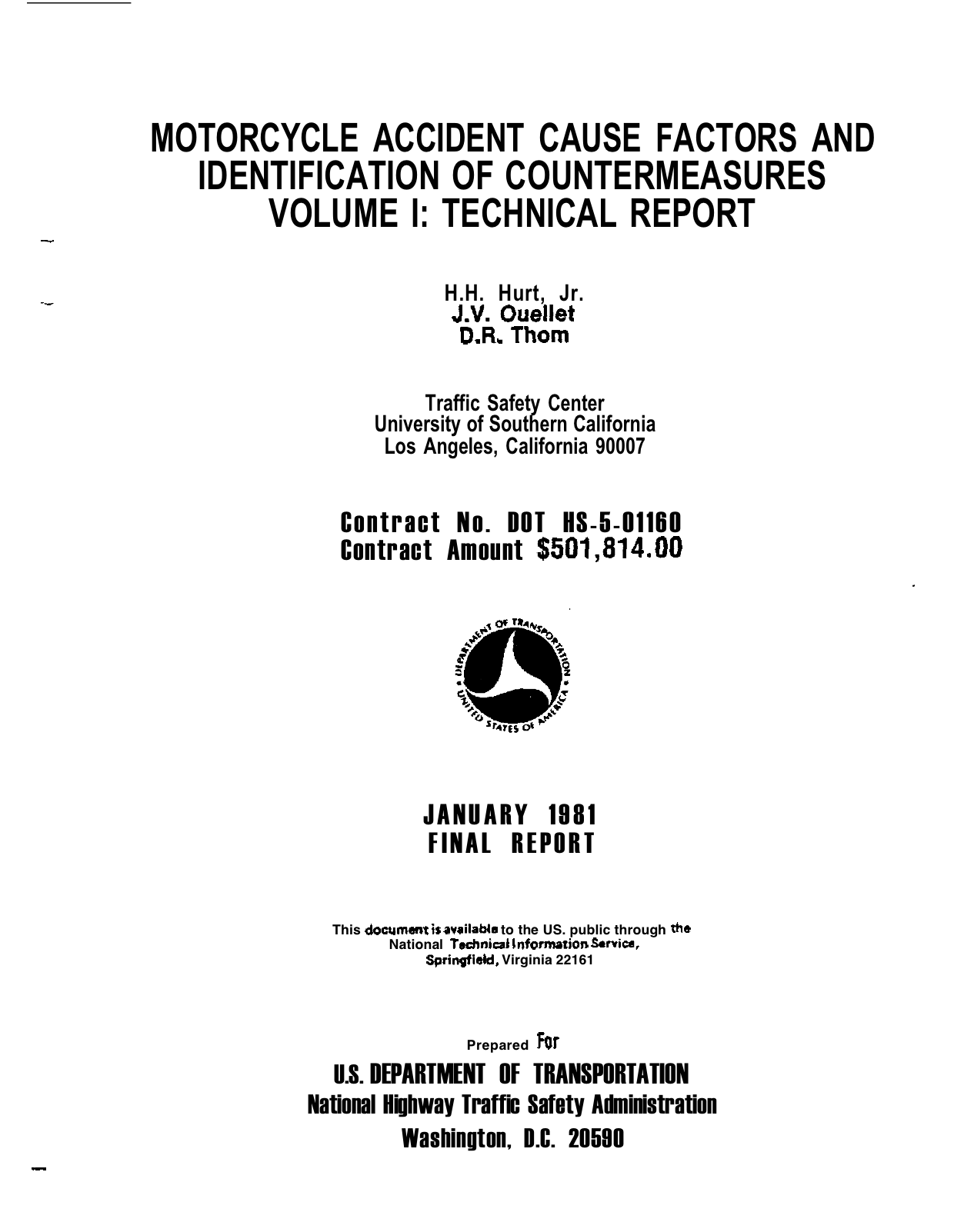
Motorcycle Accident Cause Factors and Identification of Countermeasures, Volume 1: Technical Report (cover page)

The Hurt Report, officially Motorcycle Accident Cause Factors and Identification of Countermeasures, was a motorcycle safety study conducted in the United States, initiated in 1976 and published in 1981. The report is named after its primary author, Professor Harry Hurt.

Noted motorcycle journalist David L. Hough described the Hurt Report as "the most comprehensive motorcycle safety study of the 20th century."

The study was initiated by the Department of Transportation's National Highway Traffic Safety Administration, which contracted with the University of Southern California Traffic Safety Center — the work was ultimately conducted by USC professor Harry Hurt.

The Hurt Report findings significantly advanced the state of knowledge of the causes of motorcycle accidents, in particular pointing out the widespread problem of car drivers failing to see an approaching motorcycle and precipitating a crash by violating the motorcyclist's right-of-way. The study also provided data clearly showing that helmets significantly reduce deaths and brain injuries without any increased risk of accident involvement or neck injury. The full title of the report was Motorcycle Accident Cause Factors and Identification of Countermeasures, Volume 1: Technical Report.

After retiring from USC in 1998, Hurt established and headed the Head Protection Research Laboratory (HPRL), of Paramount, CA.

== Procedure ==
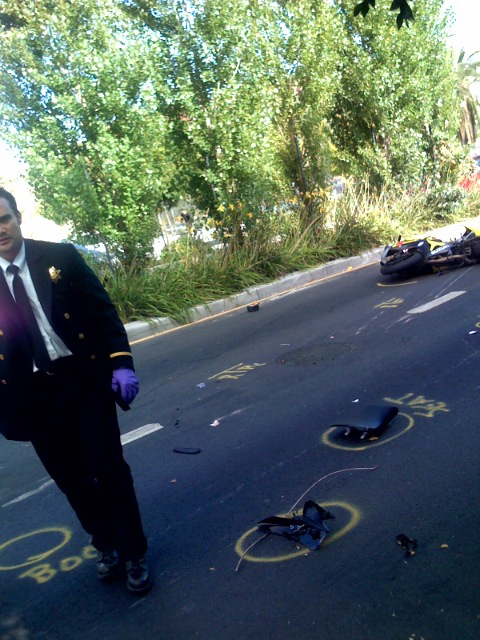
A 2007 motorcycle crash scene investigation in San Francisco.

Professor Hurt, with a team of investigators (all of whom were motorcyclists themselves) examined motorcycle accident scenes in the City of Los Angeles, day and night, during the twenty-four-month period of 1976–77. They did on-scene investigations of over 900 accidents and studied 3,600 police reports from the area of each accident. Investigators later returned to 505 crash scenes at the same time of day, same day of the week and with the same environmental conditions to measure traffic volumes, photograph passing motorcycles and interview 2,310 riders who stopped to talk with investigators. This allowed the research team to compare accident-involved riders to riders in the same location who were not involved in a crash.

The study took place throughout the City of Los Angeles including urban as well as rural conditions, e.g., incidents of motorcycles striking animals.

Each accident was studied individually with approximately 1,000 data elements, collected for each of the 900 accident scenes, including measuring and photographing vehicle damage, skid marks, scrape marks, people marks, and interviewing survivors. Hundreds of accident-involved riders donated their helmet to the research, which allowed team members to disassemble, measure, photograph and record the accident damage as part of the study.

== Findings ==
The Hurt Report summarized accident findings related to motorcycle crashes into a 55-point list. Among the major points: two-thirds of motorcycle-car crashes occurred when the car driver failed to see the approaching motorcycle and violated the rider's right-of-way. The report also provided data showing clearly that helmets significantly reduce the risk of brain injury and death but with no increased risk of crash involvement or neck injury.

== Current validity ==
When interviewed in 1999, Professor Hurt "confided that he believes the report is still basically valid."

Nonetheless, while the Hurt Report "remains the benchmark of motorcycle crash research" and contained at the time of its publication factual, verifiable information, in clear scientific terms — it has been described as outdated. In the year 2000, editors from the Motorcycle Safety Foundation wrote, in preparing the National Agenda for Motorcycle Safety:

It was apparent that our effectiveness would be limited by a consistent lack of viable, current research in most subjects related to motorcycling safety. Wide-ranging changes in motorcycling and related factors have altered the motorcycling landscape since the Hurt Report so thoroughly that it is impossible to determine if the findings of past studies are still valid.

The National Agenda for Motorcycle Safety study cited a broad list of changes that have occurred that affect the current validity of the Hurt Report, broken into four categories:

- Motorcycle Engineering Changes
- User Population Changes
- Automobile Engineering Changes
- Roadway Environmental Changes

Hurt argues that the age of the study does not necessarily invalidate all its findings or even its core findings; rather, it highlights the need for current work to affirm or update the current state of motorcycle safety:

The more time goes by, the less things look different. Riders today have the same sort of accidents as riders in the 1970s, except that today they crash much more expensive bikes.

— Professor Hugh H. ("Harry") Hurt Jr

== Later studies ==
Between 1997 and 2008, motorcycle rider annual fatalities increased from 2,116 to 5,290 – a 150 percent jump, according to U.S. Department of Transportation's Fatality Analysis Reporting System. In 2008 alone, deaths due to motorcycle crashes rose by an estimated 2.2 percent while all other vehicle classes saw reductions in fatalities.

—Oklahoma State University, Transportation Center, 2009

In David Hough's book Proficient Motorcycling, Dr. Hurt said he had always assumed a new study would be conducted.

In 1999, the European Commission conducted the MAIDS report, comparable in scale to the Hurt Report, following Organisation for Economic Co-operation and Development (OECD) standards, and studying 921 accidents as well as exposure data on an additional 923 cases from five locations in France, Germany, Netherlands, Spain and Italy.

In 2005, Congress passed the Safe, Accountable, Flexible, Efficient Transportation Equity Act: A Legacy for Users (SAFETEA-LU) law (2005-2009) mandating a new motorcycle crash study and budgeted $2.8 million for the study, providing that motorcyclists, manufacturers, and other motorcycle related organizations would match that amount. The AMA committed $100,000 to the study, and continues to raise awareness and raise funds, and the Motorcycle Safety Foundation pledged $2.8 million — with several conditions, including a provision that at least 900 cases would be studied. At the time, the funding was still about $2 million short. The National Transportation Safety Board originally had recommended a scope of 900 to 1,200 case studies.

In 2009, the Federal Highway Administration and Oklahoma State University's Oklahoma Transportation Center began conducting an 'abbreviated' Motorcycle Crash Causation Study with 300 case studies "to help identify common factors – including road configurations, environmental conditions and rider experience" and "how these factors may be affected by countermeasures that, if effectively implemented, will prevent motorcycle crashes or lessen the harm when they occur."

Consistent with its stated provisions, the Motorcycle Safety Foundation withdrew support of the abbreviated study, saying such a study would be "unlikely to either validate the findings of prior studies or establish, to any statistical significant level, any new causative factors. The abbreviated study would be unlikely to accomplish either of these goals because the sample size is expected to be only 300 crashes, compared to the 900 crashes collected and analyzed in the Hurt Study, 921 in the MAID's Study (Europe 2000) and the 1,200 recommended by the National Transportation Safety Board."

Published in 2011, Liz de Rome and colleagues undertook the first comprehensive study into the effectiveness of motorcycle personal protective equipment. In order to establish whether motorcycle personal protective clothing should be considered an effective safety measure, their in-depth motorcycle crash cohort study was conducted over 12 months in Australia. It found that while protective clothing is associated with reduced risk and severity of crash-related injuries, a high proportion of clothing failed under crash conditions.

Moreover, it also found that motorcycle armor is ineffective at reducing fractures. Subsequent research by Bianca Albanese and colleagues (2017) may explain this ineffectiveness: the CE marking standard for motorcycle armour is too low, with inadequate impact absorption to reduce fractures. It was the first study to conclude that: “A reduction in the maximum force limit would improve rider protection and appears feasible.”

=== Standards ===
Work continues on determining a global standard for collection of worldwide data on motorcycle accidents and safety, which would enable international sharing of research. Such a standard would meet methodology criteria developed globally with the Organisation for Economic Co-operation and Development (OECD) and complying with Principles of Good Laboratory Practices and national as well as international regulations — ultimately to be adopted as a standard by the International Organization for Standardization (ISO).

While the CE marking standard for motorcycle protective clothing has been criticised for regulatory capture by the industry, the EU is supporting the PIONEERS research programme – a comprehensive study into motorcycle protective clothing – via Horizon 2020 funding. The PIONEERS study aims to inform improved CE standards for motorcyclists’ protective equipment.

== See also ==
- MAIDS report
