= Stay Upright =

Australian motorcycle training school

- Type: Private company
- Industry: Motorcycle rider training
- Founded: 1981, Sydney, New South Wales, Australia
- Founder: Warwick Schuberg
- Area served: New South Wales, Victoria, Queensland, Australian Capital Territory, Western Australia, Tasmania
- Services: Motorcycle licensing courses, advanced rider training, workplace motorcycle safety training

Stay Upright is an Australian motorcycle rider training organisation founded in 1981 in Sydney, New South Wales. It is generally credited as the first organisation to offer motorcycle rider training to the general public in Australia, and operates as a Registered Training Organisation (RTO 90714) accredited by the Australian Skills Quality Authority (ASQA).

== History ==
Stay Upright Proprietary Limited was incorporated in 1981 by Warwick Schuberg, who has remained the company's director and was formerly head of the New South Wales Police Rider Training Unit. According to the company, it was founded in June 1981 by two former police rider trainers.

Stay Upright became a contractor to the New South Wales Roads and Traffic Authority (later Roads and Maritime Services, now part of Transport for NSW) in 1990, beginning operations at the Gosford office of the Roads and Traffic Authority in 1991 before expanding its services across the state. The organisation subsequently expanded into Victoria, Queensland, the Australian Capital Territory, Western Australia, and Tasmania.

In 2021, Stay Upright established a training facility in Myaree, a suburb of Perth, becoming the first organisation to operate a dedicated motorcycle training facility in Western Australia. The same year, the organisation also opened a facility in Brisbane in partnership with the motorcycle retail group MotorCycle Holdings.

Stay Upright has been accredited by Transport for NSW to deliver pre-learner and pre-provisional licensing courses for three-wheeled vehicles ("trikes"), a licensing pathway distinct from the standard motorcycle licence. In 2023, Stay Upright became an approved training provider for Motorcycling NSW, the state's governing body for motorcycle sport.

In 2022, Transport for NSW introduced a mandatory pre-learner training course for three-wheeled vehicles, developed and delivered by Stay Upright.

== Operations ==
Stay Upright delivers mandatory motorcycle licensing courses under contract to state transport authorities, including Transport for NSW, VicRoads, and the Queensland Department of Transport and Main Roads. The organisation has also been reported to train approximately 70,000 riders annually nationwide.

In addition to licensing courses, Stay Upright offers advanced rider training under the "SU Roadsmart" brand, off-road and closed-circuit track-based courses, and workplace motorcycle safety training for employers operating two-wheeled motorcycles, quad bikes, and side-by-side vehicles.

Stay Upright lodged Submission No. 18 to the Inquiry into Motorcycle Safety in NSW, conducted by the Parliament of New South Wales's Joint Standing Committee on Road Safety (Staysafe), dated 10 September 2015. The submission addressed several aspects of motorcycle safety policy, including the risks associated with returning and infrequent riders, and was cited in the Committee's final report.

During the COVID-19 pandemic in 2020, Stay Upright reported a greater than 20 per cent increase in enrolments compared to the prior year, attributed to reduced public transport use and cost-of-living pressures.
