= Congressional Motorcycle Caucus =

Caucus of the US Congress

- House Caucus Co-Chair: Rep. Tim Walberg (MI-7)
- House Caucus Co-Chair: Troy Balderson (OH-12)
- House Caucus Co-Chair: Donald Norcross (NJ-01)
- Senate Caucus Co-Chair: Joni Ernst (IA)
- Senate Caucus Co-Chair: Gary Peters (MI)
- Political position: Bipartisan
- Seats in the House: 28 / 435
- Seats in the Senate: 7 / 100

The Congressional Motorcycle Caucus is a bipartisan bicameral caucus in the United States House of Representatives and United States Senate.

== Founding and members ==
The caucus founders and co-chairs are Representatives Michael C. Burgess (R-TX) and Tim Walberg (R-MI). The caucus was founded on June 26, 2009, and is officially registered with the Committee on House Administration, the House committee responsible for regulating caucuses. As of 2025, there were 35 members – five Democrats, twenty-nine Republicans, and one Independent.

== Roster ==
1. Tim Walberg (R-MI) House Co-Chair
2. Troy Balderson (R-OH) House Co-Chair
3. Donald Norcross (D-NJ) House Co-Chair
4. Derrick Van Orden (R-WI) House Co-Chair
5. Mark Amodei (R-NV)
6. Don Bacon (R-NE)
7. Jim Banks (R-IN)
8. Mike Bost (R-IL)
9. Tim Burchett (R-TN)
10. Eric Burlison (R-MO)
11. Angie Craig (D-MN)
12. Rick Crawford (R-AR)
13. John Curtis (R-UT)
14. Warren Davidson (R-OH)
15. Paul Gosar (R-AZ)
16. Glenn Grothman (R-WI)
17. Andy Harris (R-MD)
18. Dusty Johnson (R-SD)
19. Barry Loudermilk (R-GA)
20. Tracey Mann (R-KS)
21. Mariannette Miller-Meeks (R-IA)
22. Ralph Norman (R-SC)
23. Scott Perry (R-PA)
24. Adam Smith (D-WA)
25. Pete Stauber (R-MN)
26. Bryan Steil (R-WI)
27. GT Thompson (R-PA)
28. Dina Titus (D-NV)
29. Jeff Van Drew (R-NJ)
30. Joe Wilson (R-SC)
31. Joni Ernst (R-IA)
32. Gary Peters (D-MI)
33. Angus King (I-ME)
34. Mike Rounds (R-SD)
35. John Thune (R-SD)

== Activities ==
In an open letter to motorcyclists in 2010, the Congressional Motorcycle Safety Caucus urged riders to participate in the annual Ride to Work Day on June 21, 2010, and encouraged riders and other road users to focus on safety.

In April 2021, Congressman Michael C. Burgess, M.D. (R-TX), Congressman Tim Walberg (R-MI), Senator Joni Ernst (R-IA), Senator Gary Peters (D-MI), and the House and Senate Congressional Motorcycle Caucuses introduced a bicameral resolution to designate May as Motorcycle Safety Awareness Month.

Before the 117th U.S. Congress ended its session in December 2022, it passed a bipartisan resolution, H. Res. 366, highlighting motorcyclist profiling and promoting collaboration between the motorcycle and law enforcement communities. Michigan Congressman Tim Walberg, co-chair of the Congressional Motorcycle Caucus, sponsored the resolution and introduced it along with fellow co-chair Michael C. Burgess of Texas, plus Cheri Bustos of Illinois and Mark Pocan of Wisconsin.

== See also ==
- Motorcycle safety
- Motorcycle training
- Motorcycling
- Motorcycle Safety Foundation
- American Motorcyclist Association
