= Motorcycle safety =

Study of the risks and dangers of motorcycling

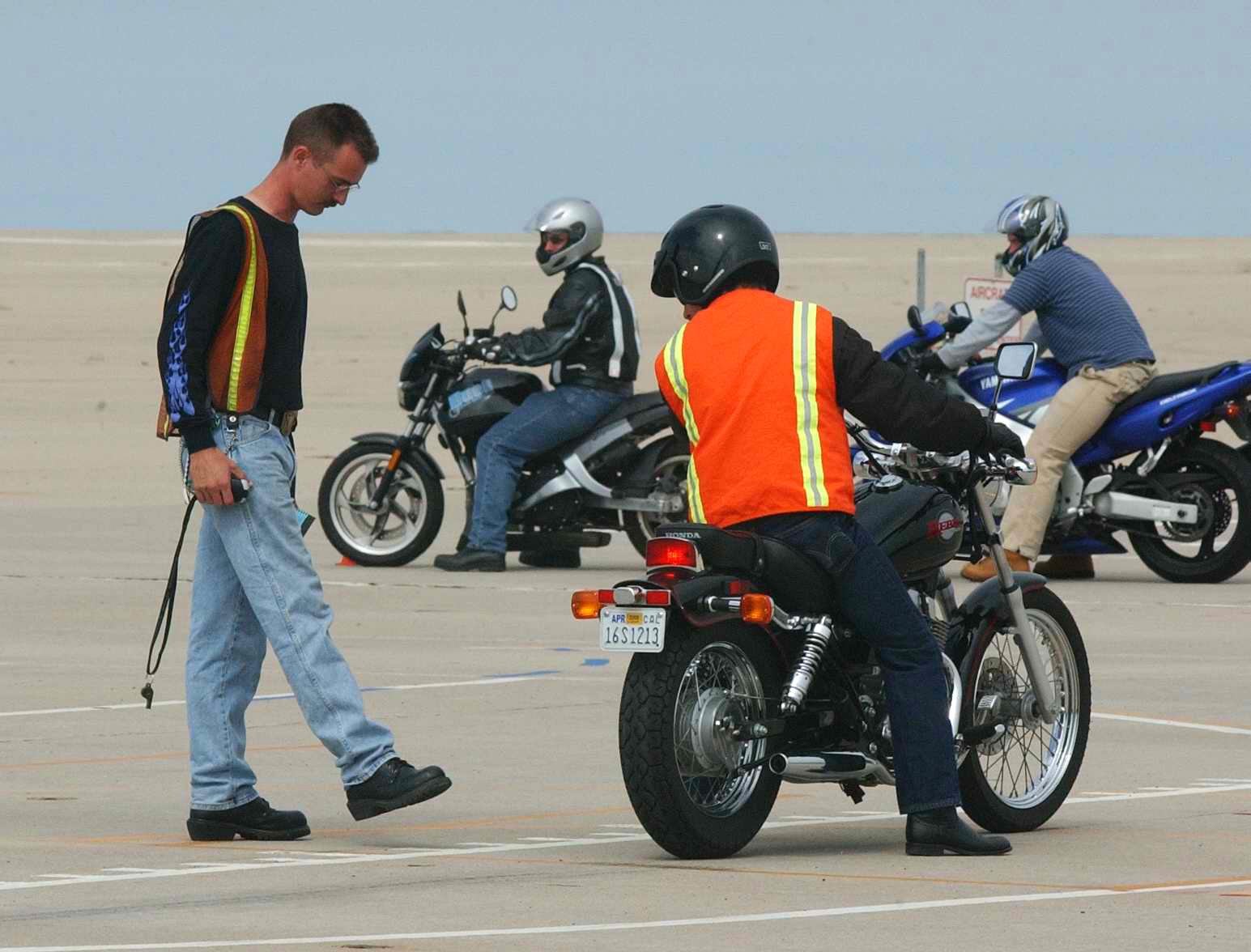
US Navy motorcycle training at Imperial Beach

Motorcycle safety is the study of the risks and dangers of motorcycling, and the approaches to mitigate that risk, focusing on motorcycle design, road design and traffic rules, rider training, and the cultural attitudes of motorcyclists and other road users.

Riding motorcycles on public roads carries several times the risk of riding in cars, which themselves are more risky than public conveyances like buses and trains. The human factors of motorcycle crashes are roughly equal between rider behavior and the actions of drivers sharing the roads. Technological changes, especially in the latter half of the 20th century, have made significant improvements in motorcycle safety. Serious research into motorcycle safety began in the US with the Hurt Report in 1981, followed by major studies in Europe and others. The main result of this research has been a greater emphasis on rider training and stricter licensing requirements. The US military recognized the need for their own focused motorcycle rider education in response to significant off-duty injuries of military personnel.

== Crash rates and risks ==
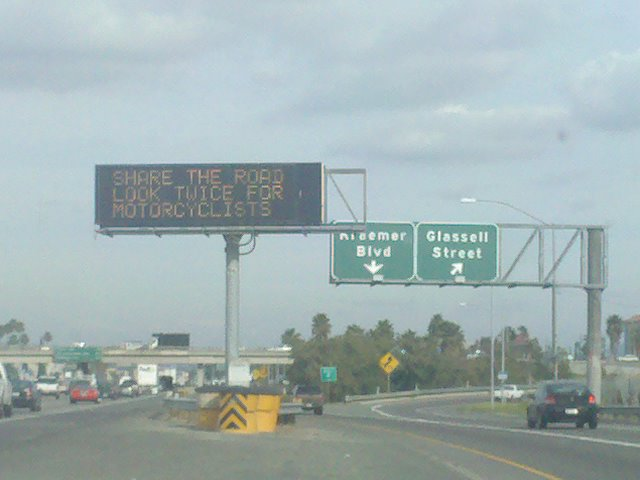
A Caltrans sign on the 91 eastbound in Anaheim, cautioning drivers to be on the lookout for motorcyclists who may be in their blind spots

Deaths per 100 million vehicle miles (~161 million km) traveled in the United States. View chart definition.
* Source, NHTSA

Traveling on a motorcycle carries a much higher risk of death or injury than driving the same distance in a car. Motorcyclists face a higher risk of fatal or severe injuries due to limited physical protection for the rider and lower visibility on the road. In 2006 US motorcyclists had a risk of a fatal crash that was 35 times greater than that of passenger cars, based on 390 motorcyclist deaths per billion vehicle miles and 11.1 car fatalities for that distance. In 2016 this rate was 28 times that for automobiles.

When looking at all reported crashes regardless of injuries, the crash rate for motorcycles in the US in 2016 was 6.31 per million miles driven, significantly higher than the rate of 3.28 crashes per million miles driven for cars and similar vehicles. However the primary reason for the higher rates of injuries and fatalities among motorcyclists is that cars provide more effective crash protection. For automobiles, 31% of crashes result in injury but only 0.29% of accidents are fatal. For motorcycles 78.3% of reported crashes result in injury and 4.24% of crashes are fatal.

Statistics from other countries confirm the US data. The UK Department for Transport indicated that motorcycles have 16 times the rate of serious injuries, people either killed or injured, compared to cars. UK data for casualties, i.e. the total of all injuries and fatalities combined, showed 6,043 casualties per billion miles traveled on motorcycles in 2017, 25.4 times the rate of 238 per billion miles travelled for cars. In the UK in 2017 there were 116.9 motorcyclist fatalities per billion passenger miles, 61.5 times the rate of 1.9 fatalities per billion passenger miles for occupants of cars. UK data shows a wider disparity between cars and motorcycles than US data in part because it is based on fatalities per passenger mile while US data is based on fatalities per vehicle mile.

A national study by the Australian Transport Safety Bureau (ATS) found that:

- Motorcycle rider death rates increased among all rider age groups between 1998 and 2000
- Motorcycle rider deaths were nearly 30 times more than drivers of other vehicles
- Motorcycle riders aged below 40 are 36 times more likely to be killed than other vehicle operators of the same age.
- Motorcycle riders aged 40 years and over are around 20 times more likely to be killed than other drivers of that same age.

Bicyclists and pedestrians are also unprotected in collisions with cars on public roads. In 2017, there were also 5,604 bicyclist casualties per billion passenger miles or 23.5 times the rate for cars, compared with pedestrians having about 7.6 times as many casualties per distance traveled. However bicycles and pedestrians travel at much lower speeds so the risk they incur per hour of travel is only a fraction as great. In contrast, the rate of fatal accidents for buses is lower than for cars, about 0.83 times as many.

The article on Motorcycle fatality rate in U.S. by year indicates that the number of motorcycle fatalities in the US has remained about 5000 per year for most of the past decade. In 2006, 13.10 cars out of 100,000 ended up in fatal crashes, while the rate for motorcycles was 72.34 per 100,000 registered motorcycles.

In the European Union (the 28 member states) there were 663 driver and passenger fatalities for mopeds and 3,644 driver and passenger fatalities for motorcycles, according to data available in May 2018, although in the UK and Ireland mopeds are counted as motorcycles. The PTW (including both moped and motorbikes) rate is 8.2 fatalities per million population in the EU in 2016.

In the EU in 2016, PTW fatalities represented 17% of traffic fatalities, with a range from 4% in Romania to 32% in Greece. More than 88% of those fatalities were males

In France motorcycle fatality rates by travelled distance are 2200% higher (that is 23 times higher) than for cars.

In the European Union (the 28 member states) there were 3657 motorcycle rider and passenger fatalities in 2016, that is 14% of EU traffic fatalities, registered in the CARE database.

== Research ==
Two major scientific research studies into the causes of motorcycle accidents have been conducted in North America and Europe: the Hurt Report (1981) and the MAIDS report (1999–00).

=== Hurt Report ===
A major work done on this subject in the United States is the Hurt Report, published in 1981 with data collected in Los Angeles and the surrounding rural areas. There have been longstanding calls for a new safety study in the US, and Congress has provided the seed money for such a project, but as yet the remainder of the funding has not all been pledged.

The Hurt Report concluded with a list of 55 findings, as well as several major recommendations for law enforcement and legislation. Among these, 75% of motorcycle accidents involved a collision with another vehicle, usually a car. In the MAIDS report, the figure is 60%.

Other notable findings in the Hurt report (quoted below) were:

- 75% of accidents were found to involve a motorcycle and a passenger vehicle, while the remaining 25% of accidents were single motorcycle accidents.
- In the single vehicle accidents, motorcycle rider error was present as the accident precipitating factor in about two-thirds of the cases, with the typical error being a slide-out and fall due to overbraking or running wide on a curve due to excess speed or lack of side bite.
- Almost half of the fatal accidents show alcohol involvement.
- Injury severity increases with speed, alcohol involvement and motorcycle size.
- In the multiple vehicle accidents, the driver of the other vehicle violated the motorcycle right-of-way and caused the accident in two-thirds of those accidents.
- The report's additional findings show that wearing appropriate gear, specifically, a motorcycle helmet and durable garments, mitigates crash injuries substantially.
- Vehicle failure accounted for less than 3% of these motorcycle accidents, and most of those were single vehicle accidents where control was lost due to a puncture flat.
- Weather is not a factor in 98% of motorcycle accidents.
- The failure of motorists to detect and recognize motorcycles in traffic is the predominating cause of motorcycle accidents. Conspicuity of the motorcycle is a critical factor in the multiple vehicle accidents, and accident involvement is significantly reduced by the use of motorcycle headlamps-on In daylight and the wearing of high visibility yellow, orange or bright red jackets.

=== MAIDS report ===
The most recent large-scale study of motorcycle accidents is the MAIDS report carried out in five European countries in 1999 to 2000, using the rigorous OECD standards, including a statistically significant sample size of over 900 crash incidents and over 900 control cases.

The MAIDS report tends to support most of the Hurt Report findings, for example that "69% of the OV [other vehicle] drivers attempted no collision avoidance manoeuvre," suggesting they did not see the motorcycle. And further that, "the largest number of PTW accidents is due to a perception failure on the part of the OV driver or the PTW rider." And "The data indicates that in 68.7% of all cases, the helmet was capable of preventing or reducing the head injury sustained by the rider (i.e., 33.2% + 35.5%). In 3.6% of all cases, the helmet was found to have no effect upon head injury" and "There were no reported cases in which the helmet was identified as the contact code for a serious or maximum neck injury."

=== Olson Report ===
A lesser-known study, known as the Olson Report after the lead investigator in a 1979 University of Michigan study, found that rider safety could be enhanced by wearing conspicuous clothing (especially yellow-green); using headlights in daytime, especially modulated headlights; and using running lights and wearing retro-reflective clothing at night.

=== Inconclusive findings on conspicuity ===
A New Zealand study using data taken between 1993 and 1996 in the city of Auckland, a "predominantly urban area" (Wells et al. ) supported the Hurt Report's call for increased rider conspicuity, claiming that riders wearing white or light colored helmets, fluorescent or reflective clothing or using daytime headlights were under-represented when compared to a group of motorcycle accident victims. The accident victims were those who were killed, admitted or treated at hospital "with an injury severity score >5 within 24 hours of a motorcycle crash". Accidents that did not result in hospitalization or treatment for a critical injury, or a death, were not considered, nor was there any consideration of involvement of other road users, or culpability. The definition of reflective or fluorescent clothing was taken to include "clothing or other articles such as a jacket, vest, apron, sash, ankle or wrist band, or back pack including stripes, decals or strips". No assessment of the type (open or full-face) of helmet was undertaken. Most of the crashes took place in "urban 50 km/h (31 mph) speed limit zones (66%), during the day (64%) and in fine weather (72%)". No association was observed between risk of crash related injury and the frontal colour of the operator's clothing or motorcycle.

The MAIDS report did not publish information on helmet color or the prevalence of reflective or fluorescent clothing in either the accident or control groups, or the use of lights in the control group, and therefore drew no statistical conclusions on their effectiveness, neither confirming nor refuting the claims of the Wells report. In each MAIDS case, the clothing worn by the rider was photographed and evaluated.

MAIDS found that motorcycles painted white were actually over-represented in the accident sample compared to the exposure data. On clothing, MAIDS used a "purely subjective" determination of if and how the clothing worn probably affected conspicuity in the accident. The report concluded that "in 65.3% of all cases, the clothing made no contribution to the conspicuity of the rider or the PTW [powered two-wheeler, i.e. motorcycle]. There were very few cases found in which the bright clothing of the PTW rider enhanced the PTW's overall conspicuity (46 cases). There were more cases in which the use of dark clothing decreased the conspicuity of the rider and the PTW (120 cases)." MAIDs concluded that in one case dark clothing actually increased conspicuity but reported none where bright clothing decreased it.

== Attitudes to risk ==
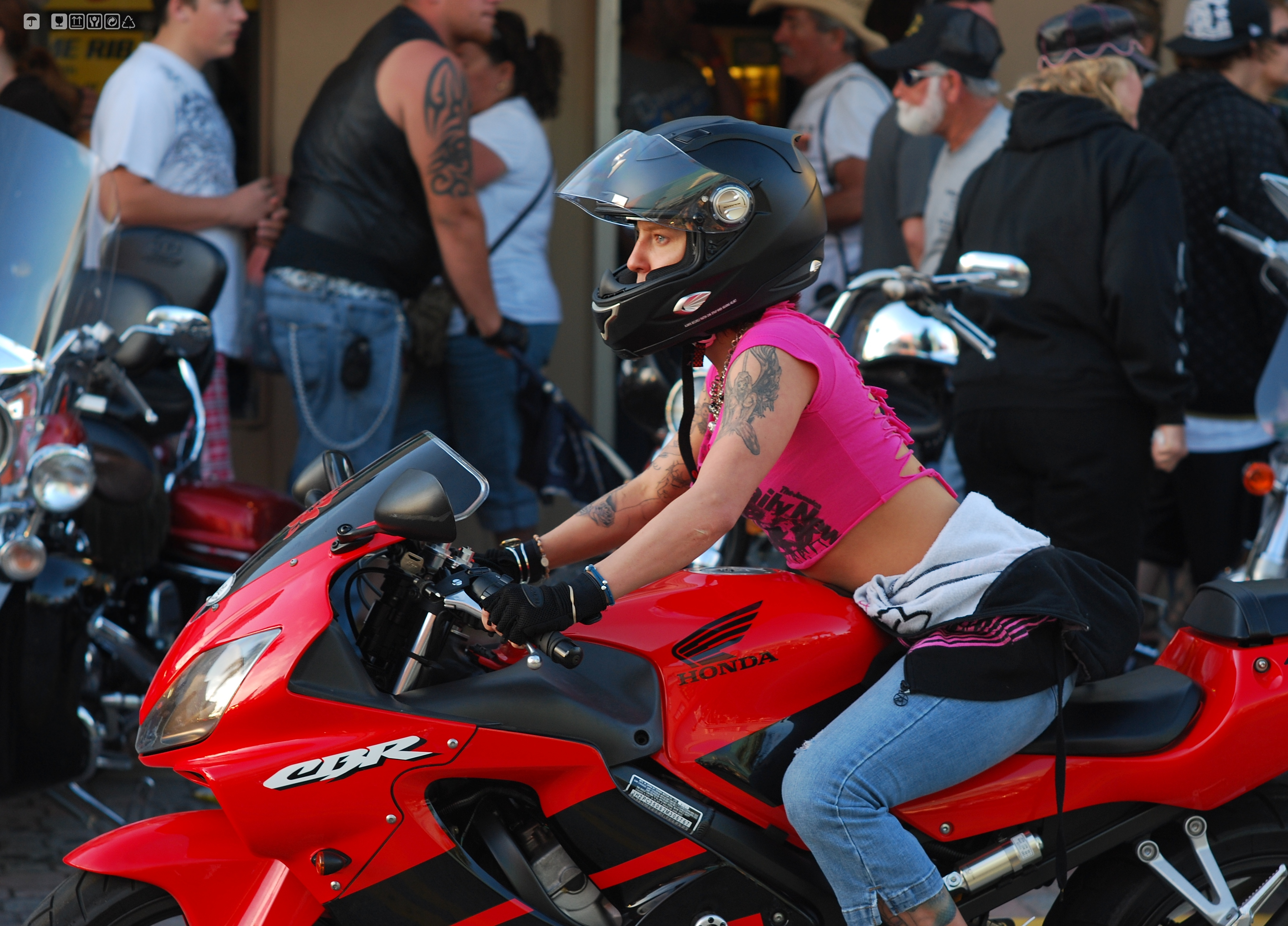
Riders have a range of different options in choosing equipment that balances safety with other priorities.

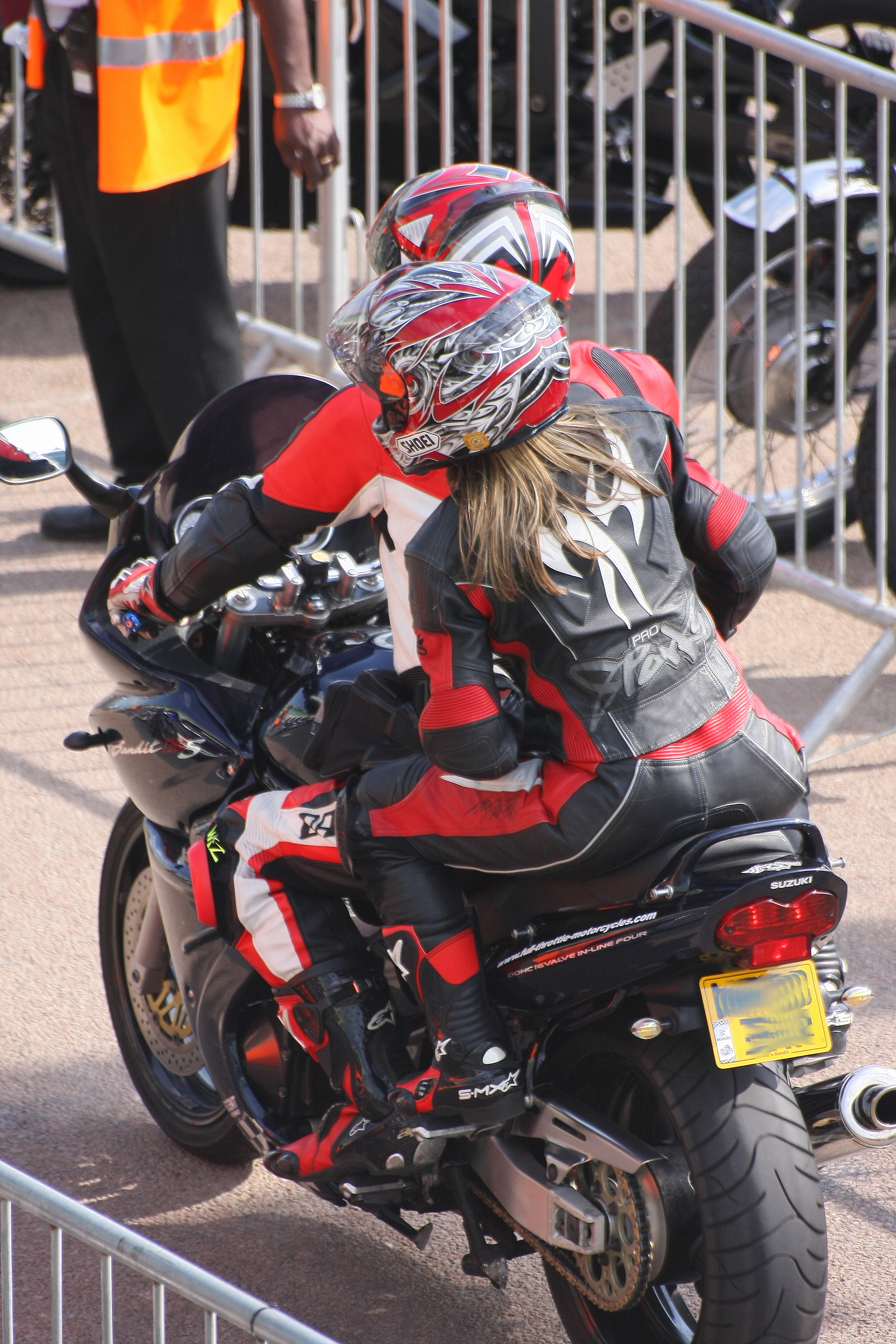
Riders with full-face helmets, boots, gloves and armored leathers

Transportation historian Jeremy Packer has suggested four categories to describe the different approaches riders take to the risks of motorcycling. Packer's book, 'Mobility without Mayhem: Safety, Cars, and Citizenship' is published by Duke University Press.

Packer's first and fourth categories take opposite views of motorcycling, but share a fatalistic notion that to motorcycle is to tempt fate. The second and third categories differ in the degree of emphasis they place on measures to limit the risk of riding, but share the view that riders have some degree of control and are not victims of fate.

1. Quit riding. Or ban motorcycling; this is the belief that motorcycling is too dangerous. Some former motorcyclists had an epiphany due to an accident involving themselves or a person they know, which permanently upends their view of motorcycling. Some are adamant in their opposition to motorcycling, unwilling to consider the merits or pleasures of riding due to their strongly held views. The late advice columnist Claire Rayner, in her review of Melissa Holbrook Pierson's motorcycling book The Perfect Vehicle, admitted she was unable to review the book objectively, because nothing Pierson wrote could change her loathing of motorcycling that originated when she was a "hospital casualty [emergency room] nurse and spent so much time dealing with bikers who were scraped off the road like so much raspberry jam after accidents", so that she "became an implacable hater of the machine... The danger to which bikers constantly put themselves, however well-wrapped in their urban armour of studded leather, and however horrendously helmeted, seems to me a reason for banning the infernal machines. ...a smell of blood and smashed muscle and bone mixed with engine oil. That is what motor cycle means to me. And, I'm afraid, always will." Some safety experts have advocated banning motorcycling altogether as being untenably dangerous.
2. Hyperreflective self-disciplinary. This attitude to risk consists of self-criticism, constant vigilance, perpetual training and practice, and continual upgrading of safety equipment. It is sometimes a reaction to an epiphany. There are many examples of riding advice which enumerate strategies for avoiding danger while riding, but they de-emphasize the rider accepting inherent risk as part of riding, instead emphasizing the rider's agency, based on his education and practice, in determining whether he will crash or not, and the utility of the correct safety gear in whether or not he will be injured in a crash. David Edwards of Cycle World wrote, "Here's the thing: motorcycles are not dangerous," saying that if a rider has a license, attends riding schools, wears all the gear all the time (ATGATT), and develops an accident avoidance sixth sense, motorcycling can become safe; "... do all of these things, become really serious about your roadcraft, and you'll be so under-represented in accident statistics as to become almost bulletproof." Kevin Cameron, also in Cycle World wrote, "[J]udgment improves with use. The longer you ride, the safer your operation tends to become. You learn to control your vehicle in a wider variety of situations, and you learn the value of playing three moves ahead of the four-wheeled traffic around you—as you must. In the process, you become a better automobile driver as well as a more skilled motorcyclist.". An Oregon reporter interviewed professional riding instructors and highly trained motorcycle officers about their risk reduction strategy and found that "they constantly tweaked their habits to stay sharp. Many never ride with groups, which they consider a distraction. They stay home on holidays and wear the most reflective gear, not black. And increasingly they talk about driving impaired – not by drugs and alcohol – but by fatigue and exposure."
3. Risk valorization. This is the acceptance that risk is unavoidable but can be embraced by making certain choices, whereby motorcyclists, "reappropriate risk and motorcycling as something which can't be measured only according to utility and efficiency... This discourse doesn't eschew safety in absolute terms, but neither does it maintain the validity of safety as the be-all and end-all for riding." Motorcycling advocate and writer Wendy Moon said that one of the reasons she relaxed her insistence on always wearing a helmet while riding was that she no longer considered it worth "the mental effort required to maintain that protective attitude. I am not free to live in the now because I'm enslaved to the future 'what if.' ...So we gradually distance ourselves from experiencing a full and free life and we don't even know it. As a society, we're like kids so bundled up against the snow we cannot move at all.... Embracing that risk rejuvenates the soul and empowers one to live the rest of her life as she wants."
4. Flaunting risk. Hunter S. Thompson's passages in his book Hell's Angels have been quoted by Packer and others as perhaps the best illustrations of the devil-may-care approach of a sizable group of motorcyclists: "They shun even the minimum safety measures that most cyclists take for granted. You will never see a Hell's Angel wearing a crash helmet. Nor do they wear Brando-Dylan-style 'silver-studded phantom' leather jackets," and "anything safe, they want no part of", and "The Angels don't want anybody to think they're hedging their bets." In his essay Song of the Sausage Creature, Thompson wrote, "It is an atavistic mentality, a peculiar mix of low style, high speed, pure dumbness, and overweening commitment to the Cafe Life and all its dangerous pleasures." Packer calls it, "a fate driven sensibility."

Packer is a Michel Foucault-inspired historian who sees the approach to motorcycle safety found in mainstream sport and touring motorcycling media, supported by the MSF, and generally consistent with the advice of transport agencies, such as the US National Agenda for Motorcycle Safety, as an ideology or "discourse", and places it as only one among multiple ideologies one may hold about motorcycling risk. While giving respect to the first two discourses, Packer himself is sympathetic to the third approach and disdainful of the fourth. Packer's analysis of the second category, hyperreflective self-disciplinary, acknowledges that seriousness, sobriety, ongoing training, and wearing complete safety gear is not misguided, but also has concerns over its close alignment with the profit motives of the insurance industry, the motorcycle safety gear advertisers, and the public relations desires of motorcycle manufacturers, as well as governmental bureaucratic inertia and mission creep. He sees motorcyclists who make non-utilitarian choices balancing risk and reward as being as respectable as other categories.

BMW psychologist and researcher Bernt Spiegel has found that non-motorcyclists and novice motorcyclists usually share the fatalistic attitude described by Thompson, insofar as they think that high speed motorcycling is like a game of chicken or Russian roulette, where the rider tests his courage to see how close he can come to "the edge", or specifically the limit of traction while braking or cornering, without having any idea how close he is to exceeding that limit and crashing. In Thompson's words in Hell's Angels it is, "The Edge... There is no honest way to explain it because the only people who really know where it is are the ones who have gone over. The others — the living — are those who pushed their luck as far as they felt they could handle it, and then pulled back, or slowed down, or did whatever they had to when it came time to choose between Now and Later."

Spiegel disagrees that only those who have "gone over", that is, crashed or died, know the location of the boundary line. He says that if motorcycle racers, or even non-professional advanced riders who ride modern sport bikes near their performance limits, were approaching the limits of traction blindly, they would be like a group of blind men wandering around the top of a building, and most of them would wander off the edge and fall. In fact, Spiegel says, crashes among skilled high speed riders are so infrequent that it must be the case that they can feel where the limit of traction is as they approach the limit, before they lose traction. Spiegel's physiological and psychological experiments helped explore how it is possible for a good rider to extend his perception beyond the controls of his motorcycle out to the interface between the contact patches of his motorcycle and the road surface.

Those subscribing to the first and fourth of Packer's risk categories are likely to believe no rider can sense when he is near the traction limit, while the second and third risk categories include those who share Spiegel's view that a rider need not lose traction and start to skid to know where the limit is. Motorcycle Consumer News Proficient Motorcycling columnist Ken Condon put it that, "The best riders are able to measure traction with a good amount of accuracy" even though that amount changes depending on the motorcycle, the tires and the tires' condition, and the varying qualities of the road surface. But Condon says the rider feels the limit of traction through his hand and foot interface with the handlebars and footpegs, and the seat, rather than extending his perception out to the contact patch itself.

=== Scottish research ===
A 2006 research paper published by the Scottish Executive and entitled 'Risk and Motorcyclists in Scotland' identified attitudinal groupings in respect of risk and motorcycling. The paper identified three potential groups that they labelled as Risk Deniers, Optimistic Accepters, and Realistic Accepters. 79% of riders placed in the second or third categories.

== Motorcycle safety and society ==
The individualistic philosophy of risk acceptance and valorization attributed to some motorcyclists contrasts with the fundamentally utilitarian viewpoint Western democratic societies often adopt in setting limits to individual freedom in the interests of public safety. The utilitarian viewpoint is illustrated by concepts such as Vision Zero, a plan to minimize injuries and fatalities in transportation which originated in Sweden in 1997. Similarly, in the US, a Centers for Disease Control publication on motorcycle safety discusses the increased fatality rate seen in US states that no longer require use of helmets. The CDC does not question individual rights, but rather discusses the devastating effects of an injury or fatality on the motorcyclist's family and others in the community and questions whether the motorcyclist can really claim to be placing only himself at risk.

In France, a limit on motorcycle power to 73.6 kW (100 CV) had no proven safety benefit and was repealed in 2016. Talks about mandatory speed limiting devices have been unpopular in the motorcycle communities in countries such as the UK and Sweden. Rallies and motorcyclists' right organizations have worked to inform public officials about the negative impacts of such restrictions on their communities, with no reports of such regulations having been implemented. These groups have encouraged increased focus on rider training and roadside safety measures, the large percentage of accidents due to alcohol and drug use, non street-legal motorcycles, and the presence of riders who do not have a valid motorcycle license.

== Roadway design and maintenance ==
Roads are primarily designed for their main users, cars, and are seldom engineered with motorcycle specific safety in focus. The choice of roadside barriers and guardrails to prevent vehicles from crossing over a median or running off the road have proved to be dangerous for motorcyclists, as they are designed to dissipate braking energy for much heavier and structurally tougher cars and trucks. Moreover, they are designed to be impacted on the sliding rail and not at their support poles, which act as swords to unprotected road users. Statistical explanation for the automobile bias is found in use and fatality figures; motorcyclists are in numerical minority.

Road surface can also contribute to a crash. A sudden change in the surface can be sufficient to cause a momentary loss of traction, destabilizing the motorcycle. The risk of skidding increases if the motorcyclist is braking or changing direction. This is due to the fact that most of the braking and steering control are through the front wheel, while power is delivered through the rear wheel. During maintenance, the choice of material can be inadequate for motorcycles. For example, asphalt sealer is used to fill and repair cracks in asphalt paving, but this often creates a slick surface that can cause a motorcycle to lose traction. Sometimes, steel plates are used as temporary covers over road trenches. The sliding nature of those, combined with an inappropriate installation can cause incidents.

Australian motorcycle advocate Rodney Brown writes that the nature and likely consequences of hazards differ significantly for motorcyclists compared to drivers of other vehicles. For example, the current highway standards in the US permit pavement ridges of up to 1.5 inches (about 3.8 centimeters) without tapering, which pose a significant hazard to motorcycles. Potholes and presence of debris pose a greater hazard for motorcyclists than drivers of larger vehicles, because the former can cause a loss of stability and control and the latter can deflect a motorcycle's wheel at impact.

== Motorcycle deaths and military personnel ==
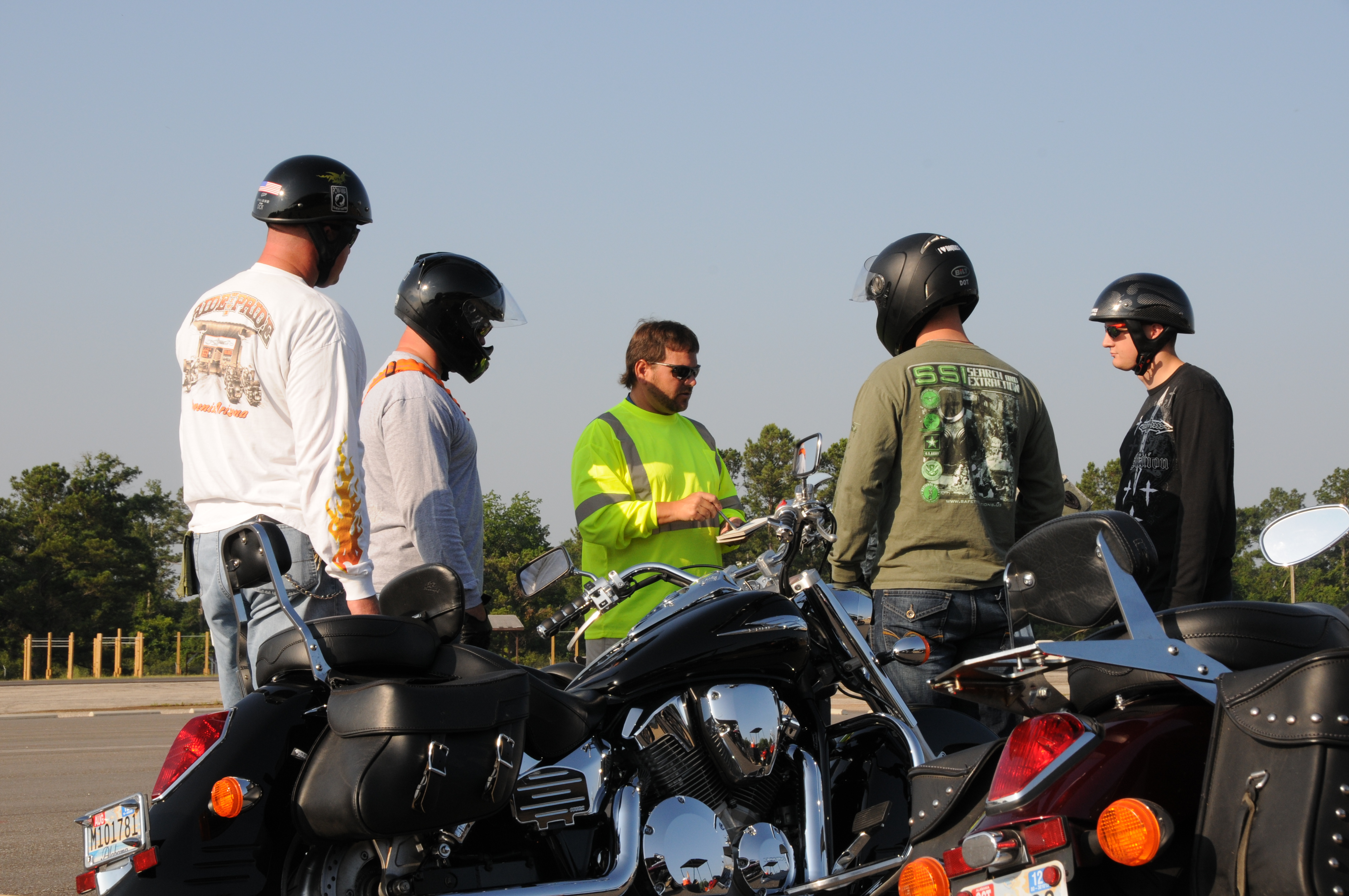
Experienced rider course for soldiers at Fort Rucker

Data from the Iraq War era showed that United States military veterans returning from Southwest Asia combat areas were dying in motorcycle related fatalities. Between October 2007 and October 2008, 24 active-duty Marines died from motorcycle accidents. There were 4,810 deaths on motorcycles in the U.S. in 2006, an increase of 5 percent over the previous year, and more than double (2,161) over the decade before, according to the National Highway Traffic Safety Administration (NHTSA). In the Marine Corps, high-speed bikes accounted for the majority of fatalities. In 2007, 78 percent of motorcycle mishaps in the Marines occurred on a sport bike, compared to 38 percent nationally.

== Consequences of accidents ==
A motorcyclist unbuckles his chin strap in order to remove his helmet after sustaining a minor hand injury through losing control on a wet corner.

Once the collision has occurred, or the rider has lost control through some other mishap, several common types of injury occur when the bike falls:

- Collision with less forgiving protective barriers or roadside "furniture" (lampposts, signs, fences, etc.). When a motorcycle falls in the middle of a curve, lamps and signs become impossible to negotiate around.
- Concussion and brain damage, as the head violently contacts other vehicles or objects. Riders wearing an approved helmet reduce the risk of death by 37 percent.
- Breakage of joints (elbows, shoulders, hips, knees and wrists), fingers, spine and neck, for the same reason. The most common breakages are the shoulder and the pelvis.
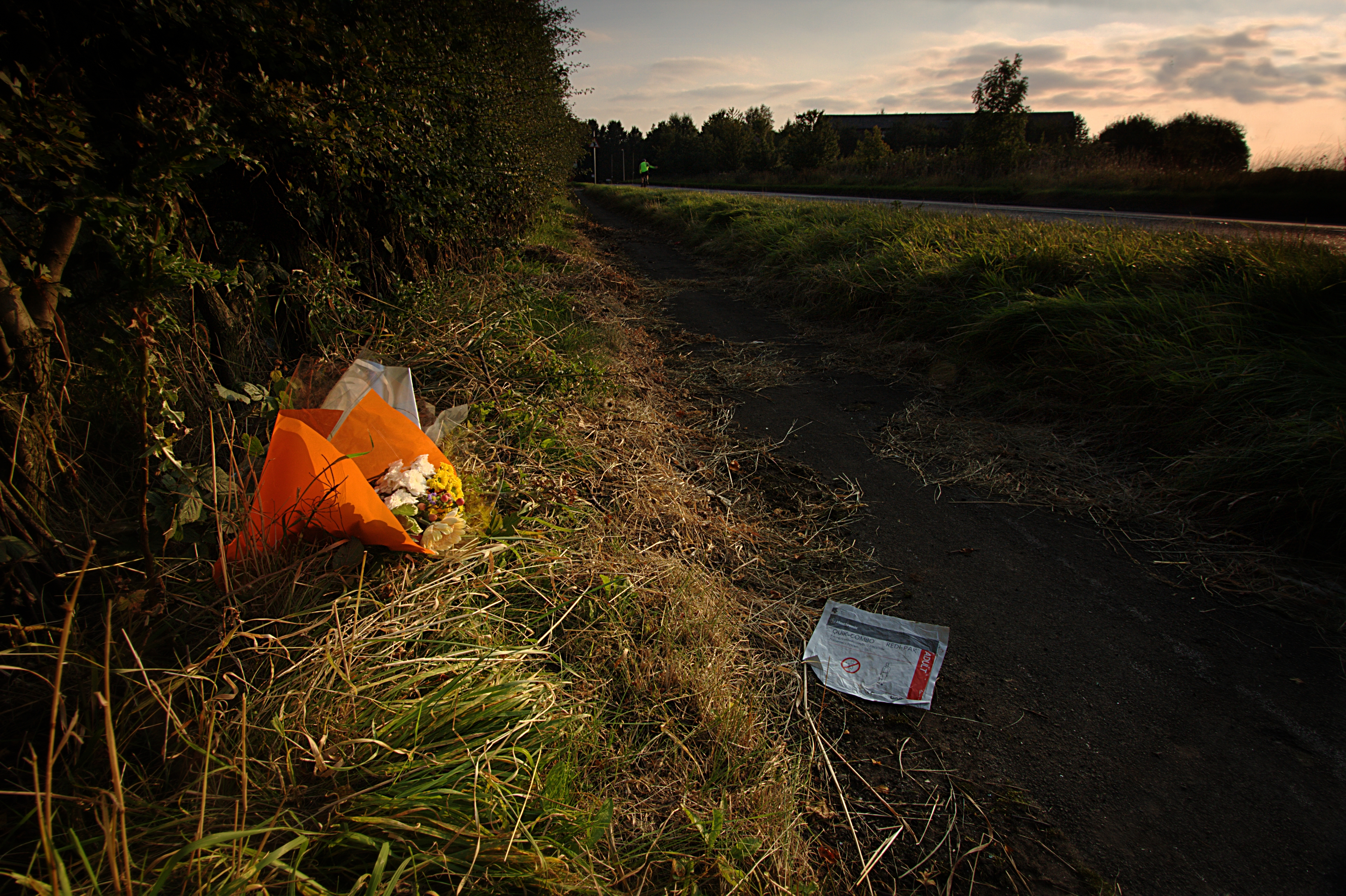
- Aftermath of a motorcycle accident. A wrapper from a defibrilation system and some flowers.
  Soft tissue (skin and muscle) damage (road rash) as the body slides across the surface. This can be prevented entirely with the proper use of motorcycle-specific protective apparel such as a leather jacket or reinforced denim and textile pants.
- There is also a condition known as biker's arm, where the nerves in the upper arm are damaged during the fall, causing a permanent paralysis of arm movement.
- Facial disfigurement, if in the absence of a full-face helmet, the unprotected face slides across the ground or smashes into an object. Thirty-five percent of all crashes show major impact on the chin-bar area.

The Hurt Report also commented on injuries after an accident stating that the likelihood of injury is extremely high in these motorcycle accidents – 98% of the multiple vehicle collisions and 96% of the single vehicle accidents resulted in some kind of injury to the motorcycle rider; 45% resulted in more than a minor injury.

In 2022, Chen et al. found several factors influencing older riders' injury severity: "Individual-level factors such as being male, old age, no valid license, drunk driving, not wearing a helmet, turning or overtaking others, early morning and evening riding, errors in traffic signaling, and exceeding the speed limit have significant effects on injury severity."

Also, in 2022, Kent et al. compared motorcycle, moped and bicycle injuries: "Overall the vast majority of injuries reported were of the extremities or pelvic girdle (62.2%), and this was true regardless of vehicle type […] The most common fractures regardless of vehicle type were of the skull/face, rib, vertebral, and tibia/fibula with slight variations between vehicle groups.

Martins et al. (2022) compared the injuries arising from loss of control accidents (LOCAs) vs collision accidents (CAs) among motorcyclists. They found: "The most common sites of major injury were the lower limb (40.9%), head and neck (38.1%), and upper limb (27.5%) […] Though both motorcycle CAs and LOCAs stress trauma systems in developing countries, the dynamics of CAs mean that they result in worse injuries and outcomes."

== Personal protective equipment ==
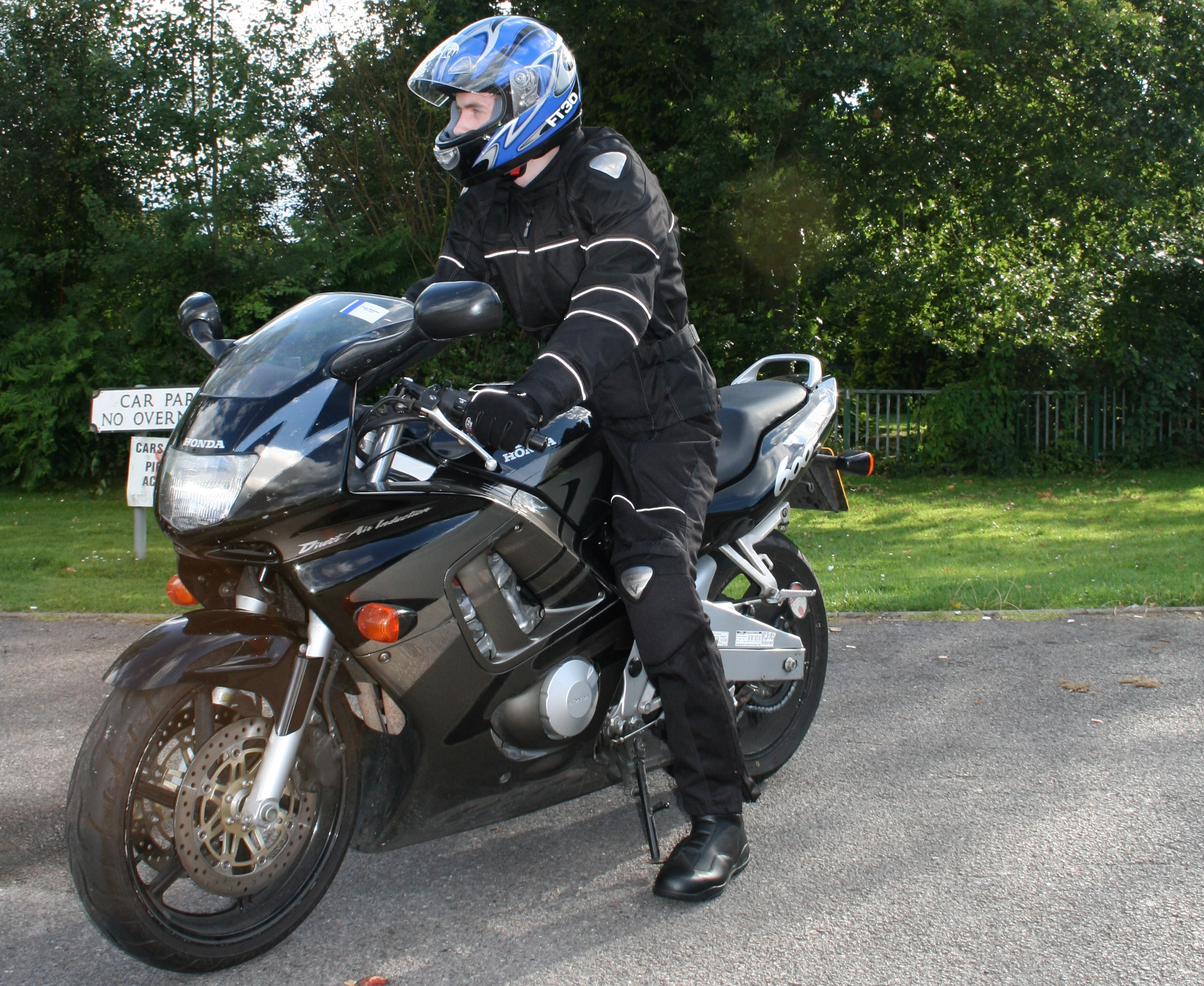
A motorcyclist wearing helmet, gloves, boots, and armored, reflective textile jacket and pants

To address the risks of motorcycling, before and after a fall, motorcyclists use personal protective equipment (PPE, or more commonly "motorcycle gear"). Many developed countries now require certain articles of PPE, and manufacturers and governments recommend its extensive use.

=== Functions of PPE ===
- Improved visibility — Although for decades the popular image of the motorcycle rider has been of someone clad head-to-toe in black leather, in the light of the Hurt Report findings, and the day-to-day experiences of motorcyclists themselves, many riders choose higher-visibility gear. Bright colors and retroreflective strips are common on quality equipment.
- Abrasion resistance — Thick, tough leather provides the most abrasion resistance in a crash, but fabrics such as Cordura, Kevlar and ballistic nylon provide significant protection too. In addition, fabrics are generally cheaper, easier to maintain, waterproof, and more comfortable in hot weather. Thick leather, which affords the most abrasion resistance, can be uncomfortable in temperatures exceeding 29 °C (85 °F) and above 38 °C (100 °F) may cause heat stress & loss of control with insufficient fluid replacement. Some PPE may be constructed of fabrics made into a 'mesh' that provides cooling and a stable surface for the attachment of padding (see below).
- Impact protection — Quality jackets and pants provide significant extra padding in the vulnerable joint regions described above. This can take the form of simple foam padding, or dual-density foam that stiffens when compressed, sometimes with plastic or carbon fiber outer-shells that distribute the impact across the pad. Integrated pieces can be found in some jackets. Another way to reduce impact is by wearing motorcycle airbag protection.
- Weather protection — One important aspect of PPE not mentioned above is protection from the elements. Extreme weather can make a long ride unbearable or dangerous. PPE provides protection from wind, rain and cold.

=== Items of PPE ===
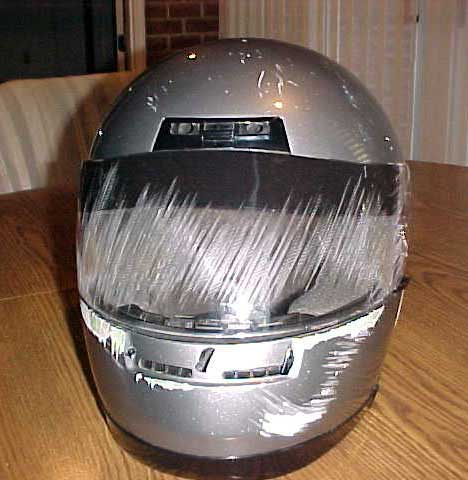
A full-face helmet after a crash

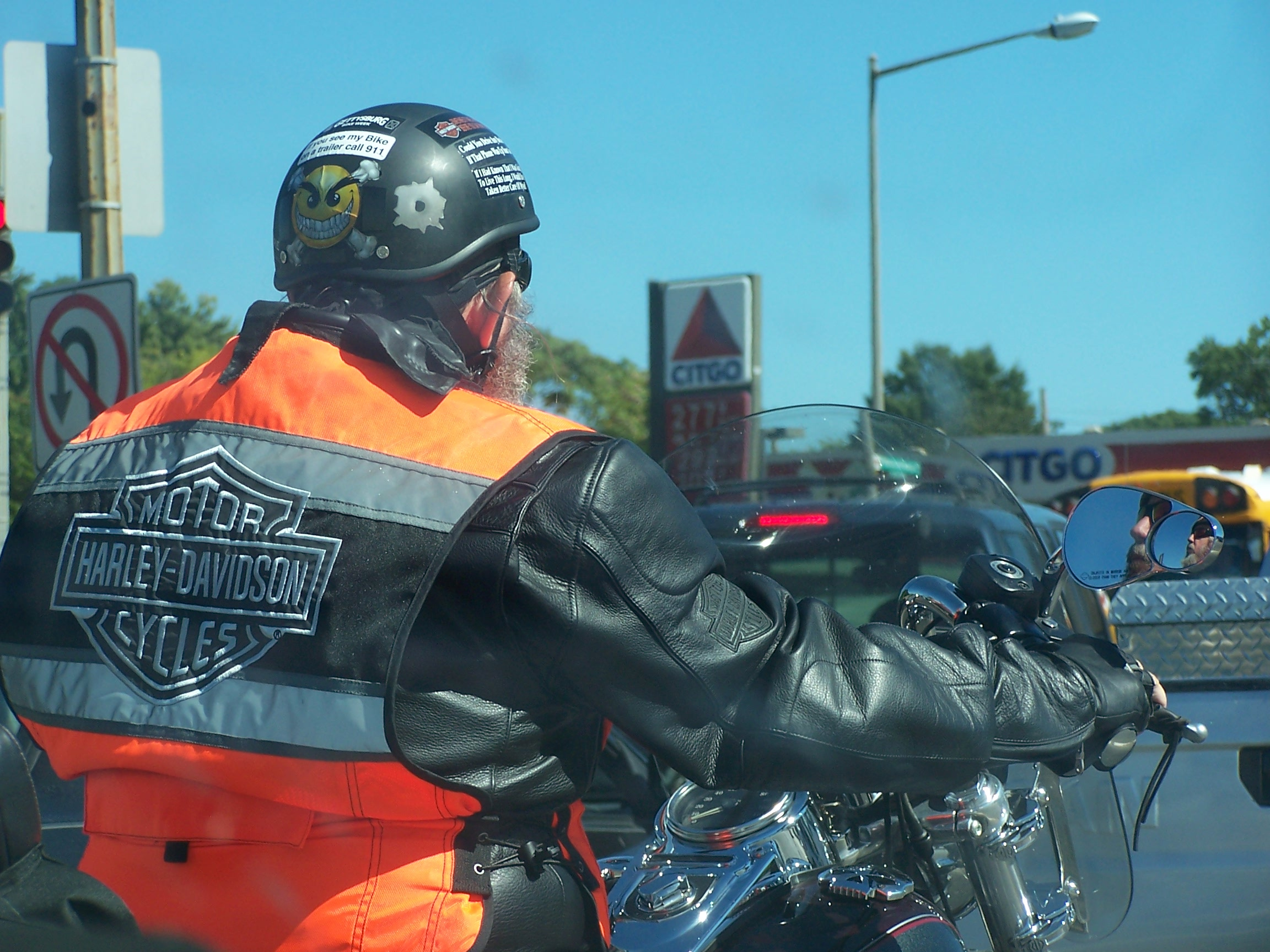
Half helmets or "skid lids" meet minimum legal requirements in the United States.

- Helmet — Wearing a helmet reduces the rider's risk of death by 37% compared to riding without it. A full-face helmet provides the most protection. Thirty-five percent of all crashes show major impact on the chin-bar area. However, 3/4- and 1/2-helmets also are available. The United Nations provides the most widely accepted international standard for motorcycle helmets, and ECE 22.06 is the latest standard. The United Kingdom's SHARP (helmet ratings) also provide independent test results about helmet models' protection levels.
- Gloves — Commonly made of leather, cordura, or Kevlar, or some combination. Some include carbon fiber knuckle protection or other forms of rigid padding. Gloves designed specifically for motorcycle use have slightly curved fingers and the seams are on the outer surfaces to allow the motorcyclist to maintain their grip and control on the handlebars and clutch/brake levers. Some gloves also provide protection to the wrist.
- Jackets — Generally made from leather, ballistic nylon, cordura, Kevlar or other synthetics. Most jackets include motorcycle armor on elbows, spine and shoulders. CE-approved armor is considered superior to uncertified padding. CE-certified back and chest protectors can be worn underneath jackets. Some motorcycle airbag jackets offer protection against extreme neck movements.
- Pants — Made of the same material as jackets, usually including motorcycle armor for the knees and hips.
- Boots — Especially those for sport riding, include reinforcement and plastic caps on the ankles, and toe area. CE-certified boots for motorcycling have been tested against resistance to abrasion, penetration by sharp objects and lateral crushing.
- Goggles or helmet visor — Eye protection is of utmost importance - an insect or a kicked-up pebble in the eye at speed has enough momentum to cause significant damage. Such an event could easily cause the rider to lose control and crash. Besides this danger, squinting into the wind is unpleasant at best and watering eyes are quite distracting.
- Earplugs — Most riders experience substantial wind noise at speeds above 64 to 80 km/h (40 to 50 mph). Earplugs help protect against hearing damage, and reduce fatigue during long rides.
- Vests — Made with high-visibility colors and retroreflective materials, vests can be worn over jackets to increase the chance of being seen and allow drivers to better judge the speed and position of riders, especially in adverse conditions of dark and wet.
- Motorcycle airbag vests – worn in jackets and vests can offer riders a neck brace and spine protection, as well as abdomen, chest, ribs, and hip/pelvic protection.
- Other PPE — Dirt bike riders wear a range of plastic armor to protect against injury from falling and hitting other riders and bikes, running into track barriers, and being hit by flying debris kicked up by the tires of other riders' bikes. This type of armor typically covers the back, chest, and sometimes the extremities.

It is increasingly common for gloves, jackets, pants, and boots to be outfitted with hard plastics on probable contact areas in an effort to ensure that when a motorcyclist contacts the ground, his clothing will permit him to slide relatively easily as opposed to "crumpling", risking injury to body parts being stressed in abnormal directions.

Riders sometimes use the acronyms MOTGMOTT and ATGATT, which stand for "Most Of The Gear Most Of The Time" and "All The Gear All The Time", when describing their personal gear preferences.

== Training ==
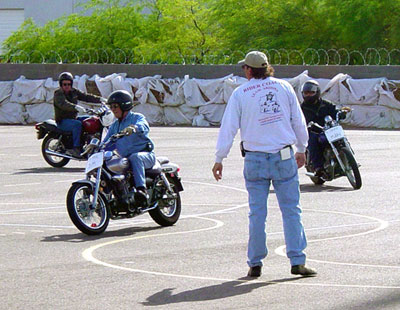
Novice motorcyclists being trained in Gilbert, Arizona

In many developed countries riders are now either required or encouraged to attend safety classes in order to obtain a separate motorcycle driving license.

Training can help to bridge the gap between a novice and experienced rider as well as improving the skills of a more experienced rider. Skills training would seem to be the answer to reducing the KSI ("killed or seriously injured") rate among motorcycle riders. However, research shows that some who undergo advanced skills training are more likely to be at a higher risk while using the roads (Rutter & Quine, 1996). This risk compensation effect was commented on in the findings of the evaluation of the "Bikesafe Scotland" scheme, where a number of those who undertook training said they rode faster in non-built-up areas after the course (Ormston et al., 2003). This is not to say that training is not important, but that more advanced training should be tempered with psychological training (Broughton 2005).

A literature review found that driver and rider education had little benefit, due to the failure of most programs to account for the age and inexperience of the highest risk drivers. After reviewing motorcycle rider education/training programs in three countries, Dan Mayhew of Canada's Traffic Injury Research Foundation said, "no compelling evidence that rider training is associated with reductions in collisions."

David L. Hough has cited risk comparisons in the Hurt Report showing riders who did not receive professional or organized training, such as those who were self-taught or learned to ride from friends and family, to be two to three times likelier to be involved in an accident than those who had rider training. Hough also said that the increase in motorcycle fatalities in the US after the year 2000 coincides with a relaxation of national rider training requirements.

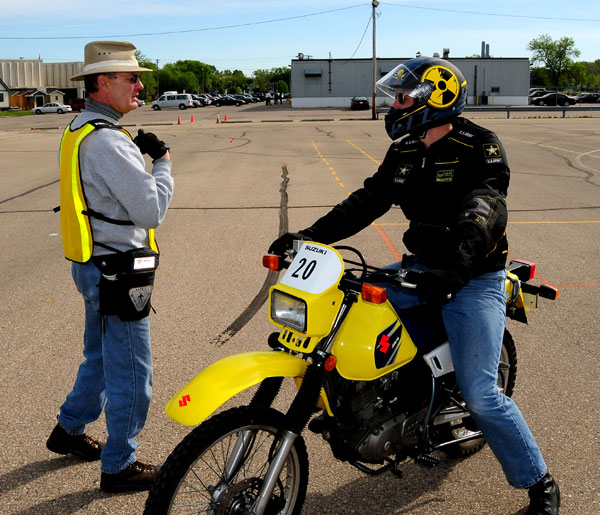
A rider receives individual coaching from an MSF instructor in Madison, Wisconsin.

In the United States, the Motorcycle Safety Foundation (MSF) provides a standardized curriculum to the states that, in turn, provide low-cost safety training for new and current riders. Two states, Oregon and Idaho, eschew MSF's curriculum in favor of their own. With over 1,500 locations in U.S., and over 120,000 annual students, MSF trains about 3% of the owners of 4,000,000 new motorcycles sold for highway use. Motorcycle injuries and fatalities among U.S. military personnel have continually risen since the early 2000s. Among other United States Department of Defense-initiated programs, the Air National Guard seeks to understand why national safety programs have not sufficiently reduced mishaps, and how those programs might be modified to cause productive behavioral change.

In the United Kingdom, for example, organizations such as the Institute of Advanced Motorists (IAM) and Royal Society for the Prevention of Accidents (RoSPA) offer advanced motorcycle rider training with the aim of reducing accident rates. There is often an added incentive to riders in the form of reduced insurance premiums.

In Canada, the Canada Safety Council (CSC), a non-profit organization, provides motorcycle safety training courses for beginner and novice riders through its Gearing Up training program. Again, as in the United States and the United Kingdom, the focus is on improved rider skills to reduce accident rates. Insurance premiums may be reduced upon successful completion as this program is recognised and supported nationally by the Motorcycle and Moped Industry Council (MMIC).

In New Zealand, the Accident Compensation Corporation provides additional motorcycle skills training under the aegis of its Ride Forever programme. As ACC is responsible for covering the costs of accidents within New Zealand, 'Ride Forever' aims to reduce its cost exposure to motorcycling related injury and rehabilitation expenses. 'Ride Forever' provides advice and online coaching and access to heavily ACC subsidised on-road instruction through a series of one day accompanied rides with registered motorcycle instructors.

=== Countersteering ===
Countersteering is used by motorcyclists, and any vehicle with two wheels that are in line (such as a bicycle or push scooter), to initiate a turn toward a given direction by momentarily steering counter to the desired direction ("steer left to turn right").

The small amount of initial countersteering input required to get the bike to lean, which is only about 0.5 seconds in average curves, makes it difficult to perceive for many. Gentle turns might require only 0.125 seconds, while sharp turns might require a whole second of countersteering at corner entry.

According to the Hurt Report, most motorcycle riders in the United States would over-brake and skid the rear wheel and under-brake the front when trying to avoid a collision. The ability to countersteer and swerve was essentially absent in many riders.

== Motorcycle equipment ==
=== Rear view mirrors ===
The majority of road / street-orientated motorcycles in Western countries are fitted with rear-view mirrors. Such mirrors are a legal requirement in (most of) the US, but not in the United Kingdom. Off-road cycles are often not fitted with mirrors. Prior to the 1960s, most motorcycles, even roadsters, were not fitted with rear-view mirrors.

=== Turn signal indicators ===
Not all motorcycles have turn signal indicators, or "blinkers." Off-road cycles do not. Prior to the 1970s, most motorcycles, even roadsters, were not fitted with turn signal indicators. Turn signal indicators are an increasing standard factory-fit feature on new road bikes, with 20 US states requiring them by law.

=== Headlights ===
On most new motorcycles, the headlights turn on as soon as the bike is started as a legal requirement. Some bikes have modulated headlights. This is accomplished using headlight modulators. This is still a subjective issue in some European countries. The argument is that the forced use of the headlight will lose all safety benefits if cars are also required to have their lights "hardwired." There is also an argument that the forced use of the headlight is seen as "aggressive" by other road users and so reinforces negative stereotypes of bike riders held by some. Modulators are legal in the US and Canada. It has been suggested that bright yellow (Selective yellow) front turn signals would be more practical and more effective than headlights in the daytime.

=== Crash bars ===
Crash bars (also called "safety bars," or "roll bars") are common equipment on cruiser-type bikes. They are designed to protect motorcycle engines and body panels. The Hurt Report concluded that crash bars are not an effective rider injury countermeasure; the reduction of injury to the ankle-foot is balanced by increase of injury to the thigh-upper leg, knee, and lower leg.

=== Anti-lock braking system ===
Anti-lock Braking Systems for motorcycles were first introduced by BMW in 1988 and soon adopted by other brands. With ABS, stopping the motorcycle is both easier and safer, allowing for a shorter stop range and reduced risk of skidding. Accident data from the EU suggest that widespread adoption of ABS could reduce motorcycle fatalities by as much as a third. All motorcycles receiving type approval in the EU were required to have ABS systems available from 1 January 2016 and all new motorcycles with an engine displacement >125cc sold from 2017 onwards are required to have ABS fitted. This followed pressure from the British IAM with support from the FIA. In regions of the world that do not mandate ABS, it is often offered as an expensive option on high end motorcycles.

ABS is highly effective at preventing skidding when a motorcycle is braking hard in an upright position. However, when banked into a corner, some of the tire traction is used to oppose lateral cornering forces and so unavailable for braking. This can result in a basic ABS system failing to prevent a skid when brakes are applied in a corner. The latest cornering ABS systems also take readings from acceleration and position sensors on the motorcycle, using these to further moderate the braking forces applied by the system if required. The result is a motorcycle less prone to operator error; one that can brake effectively in a wider range of motorcycle attitudes with much reduced risk of a low side crash due to loss of traction from a combination of braking and cornering.

=== Airbag devices ===
Fuel tank mounted airbags as well as wearable jacket airbag devices have been designed to moderate the risks involved with motorcycles.

The first motorcycle crash tests with an airbag were performed in 1973 and proved that airbag systems could be advantageous to a rider. These tests were followed up by tests in the 1990s that showed airbag devices could not fully restrain a rider when traveling more than 30 mph (48 km/h), but still reduced a rider's velocity and his or her trajectory. Honda has recently developed a fuel tank mounted airbag for the Gold Wing model that takes just 0.15 seconds to deploy. Crash sensors in the front wheel send data to the airbag ECU (electronic control unit) which in turn activates the airbag inflator. The airbag then takes the force of the rider.

Fuel tank mounted airbags can aid in saving many lives. It has been proven with crash test dummies that this type of airbag technology is very beneficial during a frontal collision. This is important because statistically, 62% of motorcycle accidents in the U.S. are frontal collisions. Additional tests were performed to show that when a motorcycle rider impacts a car during a frontal collision, the fuel tank mounted airbag prevents the person from traveling into the vehicle. This significantly reduced the head trauma by 83% that otherwise would have occurred according to the data from the crash test dummy. A rider would have lived with an airbag, whereas the fatality rate would be higher without the airbag. It has also been pointed out that this can only work if the accident is at low speed and follows the same dynamics as a car accident.

The second airbag device which is now available is an inflatable airbag jacket. A rider can wear an airbag jacket that is tethered to the motorcycle, so if he or she is thrown from the bike during a collision, the jacket will automatically inflate for a 20-second period to provide a cushion for the rider. This will lessen the upper body and internal injuries to a rider that may often be fatal. Mugen Denko pioneered the development of airbag jackets in 1995 and conducted many tests, although the idea of an airbag jacket / vest was invented by Tamás Straub who applied for Hungarian patent in 1976.

== See also ==
- Bicycle safety
- Congressional Motorcycle Safety Caucus (U.S.)
- Driver visibility
- Highsider
- Lane splitting
- List of motorcycle deaths in U.S. by year
- Lowsider
- Motorcycle safety in the United Kingdom
