= Motorcycle Safety Foundation =

- Founded: 1973
- Founder: Motorcycle Industry Council
- Type: Educational
- Location: Irvine, California
- Region served: USA
- Product: Rider Education and Training System (MSF RETS)
- Key people: James Nicholson (Chair of the Board), Christy LaCurelle (President/CEO), Ray Ochs (Vice President, Training Systems), Robert Gladden (Vice President, Training Operations)
- Website: www.msf-usa.org

The Motorcycle Safety Foundation (MSF) is an American national, not-for-profit organization, founded in 1973, and sponsored by the U.S. manufacturers and distributors of BMW, BRP, Harley-Davidson, Honda, Kawasaki, KTM, Piaggio/Vespa, Suzuki, Triumph, Indian Motorcycle and Yamaha motorcycles. The MSF maintains rider training curricula used in most states for novice and experienced riders.

The MSF fosters a "ride safe" attitude, and promotes lifelong learning for motorcyclists. It also participates in government relations, motorcycle safety research, public awareness campaigns, and technical assistance to state training and licensing programs.

== Courses ==
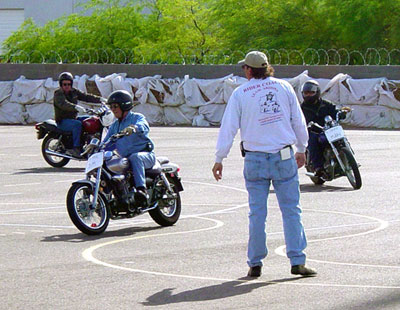
A Basic RiderCourse by TEAM Arizona in Chandler

MSF is a developer of comprehensive, research-based rider education and training curricula designed to develop or advance motorcyclists' riding skills.

As of January 2020, the Motorcycle Safety Foundation has published 28 RiderCourses for current or prospective motorcyclists. MSF offers several courses via iTunes U including "An Adventure in Motorcycle Physics", "Dr. Ray's Street Strategies", "Dr. Ray's Guide to Group Riding" and "Dr. Ray's Seasoned Rider".

MSF administers courses directly in Colorado, New Mexico, New York, and West Virginia and directly operates training sites called MSF Campuses in Troy, Ohio and Alpharetta, Georgia. However, in most states courses are administered by state agencies (i.e. Department of Motor Vehicles, Department of Transportation, Department of Public Safety) or state university or community college networks that use MSF's curricula. Individual training sites may be public, as through technical colleges, or private organizations. Thirty-one states use the MSF tests for licensing, and 41 states use the MSF motorcycle operator manual. In 45 states, these local training sites are certified by MSF. California, Idaho, Ohio, South Dakota, and Oregon states use non MSF-developed curricula. All fifty states have rider training programs.

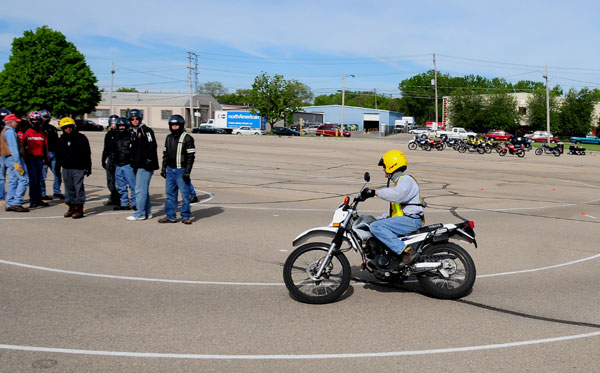
An MSF instructor demonstrates an exercise for students in Wisconsin

MSF is recognized by most state departments of transportation in the U.S. Successful completion of MSF's Basic "RiderCourse" usually replaces a state's riding exam, and may also replace the written exam, to receive a motorcycle operator's endorsement or license. Some insurance companies also offer discounts to those who have passed an MSF course. All United States military personnel are required to graduate from an MSF course to ride a motorcycle either on or off base.

== Team Oregon dispute ==
A 2006 lawsuit by the MSF over alleged intellectual property infringement by the Team Oregon Rider Safety Program was settled in 2008. Team Oregon is a motorcycle training program run by the Oregon Department of Transportation and Oregon State University. In the settlement, Team Oregon was granted permission to use MSF materials provided a statement of MSF copyright ownership was included. Team Oregon also agreed to only market its materials in Oregon, as in the past, and will still deny that the agreed upon acknowledgment of copyright is needed. Team Oregon claimed victory in the settlement, in that no payments were required and they may continue to use the training materials, while the MSF said the settlement was the same as one they had offered in 2006.

Underlying the dispute was the question of whether programs like Team Oregon, or Idaho's Skills Training Advantage for Riders (STAR), were free to develop their own training programs, specifically in response to the contention by the state programs that the MSF had made changes in their course that weakened it, making it easier to pass while putting riders at greater risk. Idaho's training manager had expected to be named in the suit along with Team Oregon, due to their similarity to Team Oregon.

== See also ==
- Congressional Motorcycle Safety Caucus
