= MAIDS report =

Motorcycle Accidents In Depth Study (MAIDS)
- Company type: Non-profit organization
- Industry: motorcycle accident research
- Founded: 1999
- Headquarters: Avenue de la Joyeuse Entrée 1 – 1040 Brussels
- Area served: European Union
- Key people: Nick Rogers - IMMA – MAIDS Management Group (MMG) chairman
- Operating income: €2.5 million
- Parent: Association of European Motorcycle Manufacturers (ACEM)
- Website: http://www.maids-study.eu

The MAIDS (Motorcycle Accidents In Depth Study) report is a large-scale, comprehensive study of Powered Two Wheelers (PTW, i.e., motorcycles, scooters and mopeds) accidents carried out across five European countries, using both accident and exposure (or control) cases, as was done in the Hurt Report, and following the standards of OECD. Starting in September, 1999, over 2000 variables were coded in each of 921 accidents, and exposure data was collected on an additional 923 cases, collected at five locations in France, Germany, Netherlands, Spain and Italy. The investigation was carried out under the auspices of the Association of European Motorcycle Manufacturers (ACEM) with the support of the European Commission

Using EC terminology, mopeds are referred to as L1 vehicles, and motorcycles and scooters over 50cc are called L3 vehicles.

The main findings of the report are (quoted verbatim):

- There were 103 cases involving a fatality of either the rider or the passenger.
- L1 vehicles were over-represented in the accident sample when compared with the exposure sample.
- More L1 vehicles were involved in accidents which took place in an urban area than L3 vehicles. (85.9% v. 62%).
- 54.3% of the PTW accidents took place at an intersection.
- Passenger cars were the most frequent collision partner (60%).
- 72% of the accidents took place in urban areas.
- A PTW was more likely to collide with a passenger car in an urban area than in a rural area. (64.1% v. 46.7%).
- Due to the absence of comparable exposure data, it was not possible to determine if any month, day of the week or time of the day was a risk factor.
