= Motorcycle Industry Council =

The Motorcycle Industry Council, or MIC, is a not-for-profit, national trade association representing manufacturers and distributors of motorcycles, scooters, motorcycle/ATV parts and accessories and members of allied trades in the United States, located in Irvine, California. The MIC was incorporated in 1970, but the association has roots extending back to the early days of motorcycling when it existed under other names since 1914.

The MIC was created to promote and preserve motorcycling and the U.S. motorcycle industry. This is accomplished through its activities in government relations, statistics, communications, technical, and aftermarket programs. They represent the off-highway vehicle industry and enthusiasts. More than 300 members represent manufacturers and distributors of motorcycles, scooters, parts and accessories, as well as allied trades such as publishing, insurance and consultants that support the continued development of statistics, effective governmental efforts and industry relations. While dealers, clubs and individuals are not eligible for membership, the MIC works with these groups on issues of mutual interest.

== Company overview ==
=== Board of directors ===
The MIC Board of Directors is responsible for the affairs of the association, including approval and review of policies, positions, programs, and fiscal operations. The Board has 12 directors; seven representing motorcycle manufacturers, importers, or distributors and five representing the aftermarket and allied trades. The MIC President is Christy LaCurelle.

April 18, 2007 The Motorcycle Industry Council (MIC) announced the election of Sarah Schilke, Director of Business Development, Fairchild Sports/Hein Gericke, to the MIC Board of Directors on the final ballot. This marked the first time in the 37-year history of the MIC that a woman has been elected to the board of directors.

=== Statistics ===
The MIC's Statistical Annual provides a wealth of information on the industry. Many dealers and businesses investigating the industry find it a useful business information tool. The Statistical Annual is approximately 25 pages long and costs $250.

=== International ===
The first United Nations World Youth Assembly for Road Safety was held in Geneva, Switzerland in April 2007. The Motorcycle Industry Council was asked to provide information on helmet use.

=== Racing series ===
On September 10, 2008, the MIC announced plans to start a new motorcycle racing series to compete with the decades-old AMA racing series which was acquired by Daytona Motorsports Group (DMG) in March 2008.

== Advocacy ==
=== Opposition to right-to-repair legislation ===
In July 2024, MIC signed a letter to members of both the House Committee on Armed Services and the Senate Committee on Armed Services opposing Section 828 of S. 4628, the National Defense Authorization Act for Fiscal Year 2025, entitled "Requirement for Contractors to Provide Reasonable Access to Repair Materials," which would require contractors doing business with the US military to agree "to provide the Department of Defense fair and reasonable access to all the repair materials, including parts, tools, and information, used by the manufacturer or provider or their authorized partners to diagnose, maintain, or repair the good or service."
