= List of findings in the Hurt Report =

This is the list of Findings in section 12.1 (pages 416-419) of the Hurt Report.

Throughout the accident and exposure data there are special observations which relate to accident and injury causation and characteristics of the motorcycle accidents studied. These findings are summarized as follows:

1. Approximately three-quarters of these motorcycle accidents involved collision with another vehicle, which was most usually a passenger automobile.
2. Approximately one-quarter of these motorcycle accidents were single vehicle accidents involving the motorcycle colliding with the roadway or some fixed object in the environment.
3. Vehicle failure accounted for less than 3% of these motorcycle accidents, and most of those were single vehicle accidents where control was lost due to a puncture flat.
4. In the single vehicle accidents, motorcycle rider error was present as the accident precipitating factor in about two-thirds of the cases, with the typical error being a slide-out and fall due to overbraking or running wide on a curve due to excess speed or under-cornering.
5. Roadway defects (pavement ridges, potholes, etc.) were the accident cause in 2% of the accidents; animal involvement was 1% of the accidents.
6. In the multiple vehicle accidents, the driver of the other vehicle violated the motorcycle right-of-way and caused the accident in two-thirds of those accidents.
7. The failure of motorists to detect and recognize motorcycles in traffic is the predominating cause of motorcycle accidents. The driver of the other vehicle involved in collision with the motorcycle did not see the motorcycle before the collision, or did not see the motorcycle until too late to avoid the collision.
8. Deliberate hostile action by a motorist against a motorcycle rider is a rare accident cause.
9. The most frequent accident configuration is the motorcycle proceeding straight then the automobile makes a left turn in front of the oncoming motorcycle.
10. Intersections are the most likely place for the motorcycle accident, with the other vehicle violating the motorcycle right-of-way, and often violating traffic controls.
11. Weather is not a factor in 98% of motorcycle accidents.
12. Most motorcycle accidents involve a short trip associated with shopping, errands, friends, entertainment or recreation, and the accident is likely to happen in very short time close to the trip origin.
13. The view of the motorcycle or the other vehicle involved in the accident is limited by glare or obstructed by other vehicles in almost half of the multiple vehicle accidents.
14. Conspicuity of the motorcycle is a critical factor in the multiple vehicle accidents, and accident involvement is significantly reduced by the use of motorcycle headlamps-on In daylight and the wearing of high visibility yellow, orange or bright red jackets.
15. Fuel system leaks and spills are present in 62% of the motorcycle accidents in the post-crash phase. This represents an undue hazard for fire.
16. The median pre-crash speed was 29.8 mph, and the median crash speed was 21.5 mph, and the one-in-a-thousand crash speed is approximately 86 mph-
17. The typical motorcycle pre-crash lines-of-sight to the traffic hazard portray no contribution of the limits of peripheral vision; more than three fourths of all accident hazards are within 45° of either side of straight ahead.
18. Conspicuity of the motorcycle is most critical for the frontal surfaces of the motorcycle and rider.
19. Vehicle defects related to accident causation are rare and likely to be due to deficient or defective maintenance.
20. Motorcycle riders between the ages of 16 and 24 are significantly Over represented in accidents; motorcycle riders between the ages of 30 and 50 are significantly underrepresented.
21. Although the majority of the accident-involved motorcycle riders are male (96%), the female motorcycle riders are significantly over represented in the accident data.
22. Craftsmen, laborers and students comprise most of the accident-involved motorcycle riders but the professionals, sales workers and craftsmen are underrepresented and the laborers, students and unemployed are over represented in the accidents.
23. Motorcycle riders with previous recent traffic citations and accidents are over represented in the accident data.
24. The motorcycle riders involved in accidents are essentially without training; 92% were self-taught or learned from family or friends. Motorcycle rider training experience reduces accident involvement and is related to reduced injuries in the event of accidents.
25. More than half of the accident-involved motorcycle riders had less than 5 months experience on the accident motorcycle, although the total street riding experience was almost 3 years. Motorcycle riders with dirt bike experience are significantly underrepresented in the accident data.
26. Lack of attention to the driving task is a common factor for the motorcyclist in an accident.
27. Almost half of the fatal accidents show alcohol involvement.
28. Motorcycle riders in these accidents showed significant collision avoidance problems. Most riders would overbrake and skid the rear wheel, and underbrake the front wheel greatly reducing collision avoidance deceleration. The ability to countersteer and swerve was essentially absent.
29. The typical motorcycle accident allows the motorcyclist just less than 2 seconds to complete all collision avoidance action.
30. Passenger carrying motorcycles are not over represented in the accident data.
31. The drivers of the other vehicle involved in collision with the motorcycle are not distinguished from other accident populations except that the ages of 20 to 29, and beyond 65 are over represented. Also, these drivers are generally unfamiliar with motorcycles.
32. The large displacement motorcycles are underrepresented in accidents but they are associated with higher injury severity when involved in accidents.
33. Any effect of motorcycle color on accident involvement is not determinable from these data, but is expected to be insignificant because the frontal surfaces are most often presented to the other vehicle involved in the collision.
34. Motorcycles equipped with fairings and windshields are underrepresented in accidents, most likely because of the contribution to conspicuity and the association with more experienced and trained riders.
35. Motorcycle riders in these accidents were significantly without motorcycle license, without any license, or with license revoked.
36. Motorcycle modifications such as those associated with the Semi-Chopper or Cafe Racer are definitely overrepresented in accidents.
37. The likelihood of injury is extremely high in these motorcycle accidents; 98% of the multiple vehicle collisions and 96% of the single vehicle accidents resulted in some kind of injury to the motorcycle rider; 45% resulted in more than a minor injury.
38. Half of the injuries to the somatic regions were to the ankle-foot, lower leg, knee, and thigh-upper leg.
39. Crash bars are not an effective injury countermeasure; the reduction of injury to the ankle-foot is balanced by increase of injury to the thigh-upper leg, knee, and lower leg.
40. The use of heavy boots, jacket, gloves, etc., is effective in preventing or reducing abrasions and lacerations, which are frequent but rarely severe injuries.
41. Groin injuries were sustained by the motorcyclist in at least 13% of the accidents, and typified by multiple vehicle collision in frontal impact at higher than average speed,
42. Injury severity increases with speed, alcohol involvement and motorcycle size.
43. Seventy-three percent of the accident-involved motorcycle riders used no eye protection, and it is likely that the wind on the unprotected eyes contributed an impairment of vision which delayed hazard detection.
44. Approximately 50% of the motorcycle riders in traffic were using safety helmets but only 40% of the accident-involved motorcycle riders were wearing helmets at the time of the accident.
45. Voluntary safety helmet use by those accident-involved motorcycle riders was lowest for untrained, uneducated, young motorcycle riders on hot days and short trips.
46. The most deadly Injuries to the accident victims were injuries to the chest and head.
47. The use of the safety helmet is the single critical factor in the prevention or reduction of head injury; the safety helmet which complies with FMVSS 218 is a significantly effective injury countermeasure.
48. Safety helmet use caused no attenuation of critical traffic sounds, no limitation of pre-crash visual field, and no fatigue or loss of attention; no element of accident causation was related to helmet use.
49. FMVSS 218 provides a high level of protection in traffic accidents, and needs modification only to increase coverage at the back of the head and demonstrate impact protection of the front of full facial coverage helmets, and insure all adult sizes for traffic use are covered by the standard.
50. Helmeted riders and passengers showed significantly lower head and neck injury for all types of injury, at all levels of injury severity.
51. The increased coverage of the full facial coverage helmet increases protection, and significantly reduces face injuries.
52. There is no liability for neck injury by wearing a safety helmet; helmeted riders had fewer neck injuries than unhelmeted riders. Only four minor injuries were attributable to helmet use, and in each case the helmet prevented possible critical or fatal head injury,
53. Sixty percent of the motorcyclists were not wearing safety helmets at the time of the accident. Of this group, 26% said they did not wear helmets because they were uncomfortable and inconvenient, and 53% simply had no expectation of accident involvement.
54. Valid motorcycle exposure data can be obtained only from collection at the traffic site, Motor vehicle or driver license data presents information which is completely unrelated to actual use,
55. Less than 10% of the motorcycle riders involved in these accidents had insurance of any kind to provide medical care or replace property.
