= Outline of motorcycles and motorcycling =

Overview of and topical guide to motorcycles and motorcycling

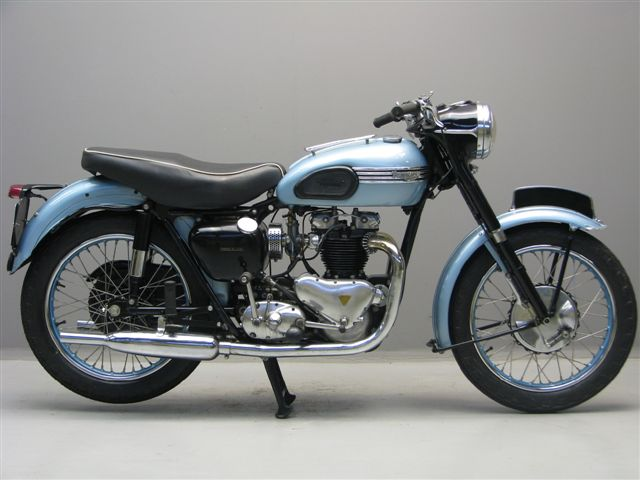
A 1954 Triumph T110

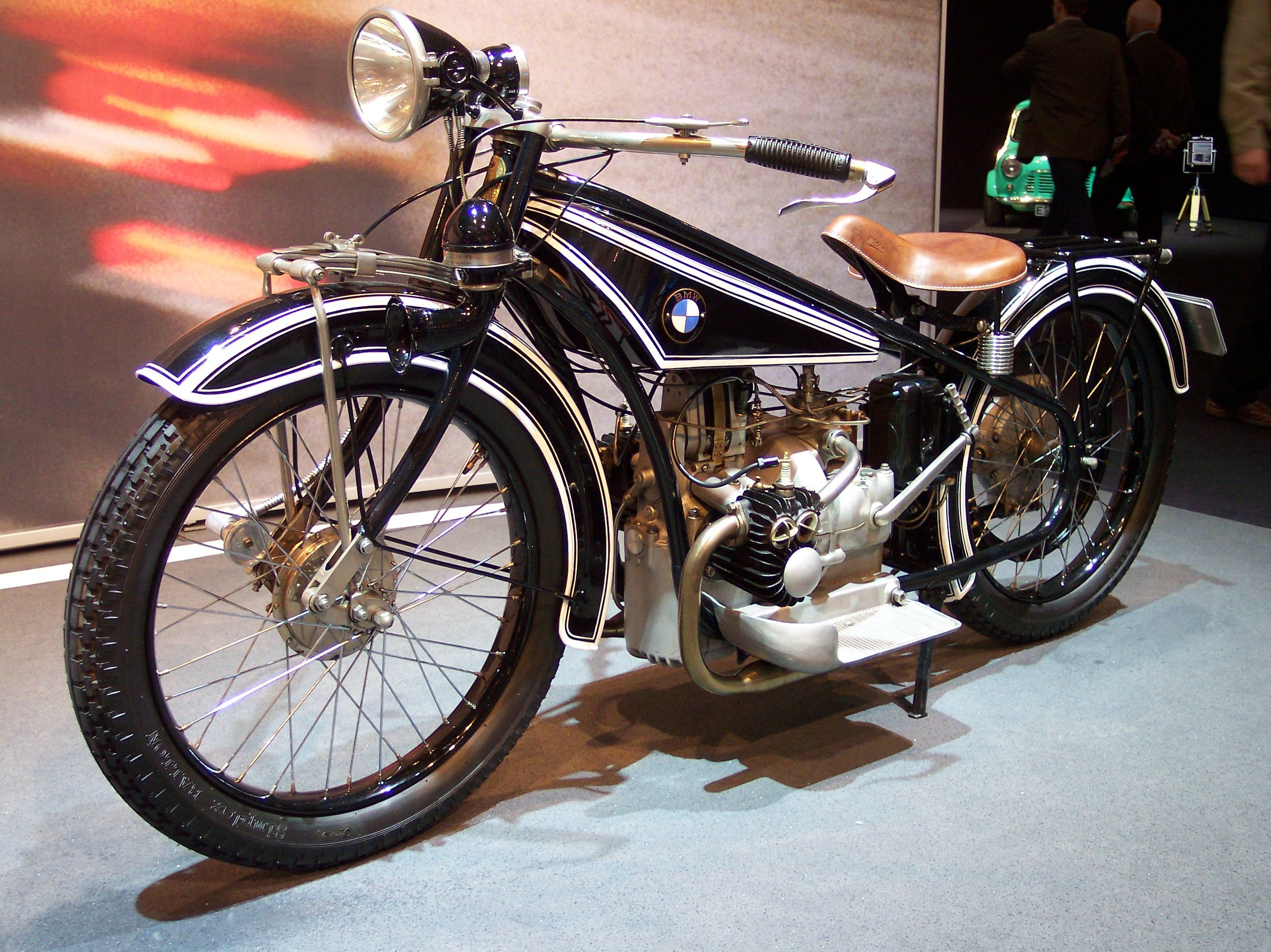
BMW's first motorcycle, the 1923-1925 R32

The following outline is provided as an overview of motorcycles and motorcycling:

Motorcycle — two-wheeled, single-track motor vehicle. Other names include: motorbike, bike, and cycle.

Motorcycling — act of riding a motorcycle, around which a variety of subcultures and lifestyles have built up.

== Motorcycles ==
=== Description ===
- Legal definition of motorcycle – a 'powered two-wheel motor vehicle'. Most countries distinguish between mopeds up to 49 cubic centimetres (3.0 cu in) and the more powerful, larger, vehicles known as motorcycles. Scooters do not count as a separate category, and are deemed to be "motorcycles".
- Some motorcycles have paired front wheels, or paired rear wheels, three in all. Motorized tricycles and sidecar outfits are deemed "motorcycles". Most jurisdictions do not consider three-wheeled cars to be motorcycles; but some (including the UK) grant low tax and driving licence exemptions to such vehicles subject to, say, weight and power limits.
- Motorcycles can be described as all of the following:
  - a component of transport
  - a component of a mode of transport
  - a component of road transport
  - a type of vehicle
  - a type of motor vehicle
  - a type of machine
  - sports equipment

=== Types ===
Types of motorcycles The design of a motorcycle reflects the purpose for which it is to be used. The main types of motorcycle include:

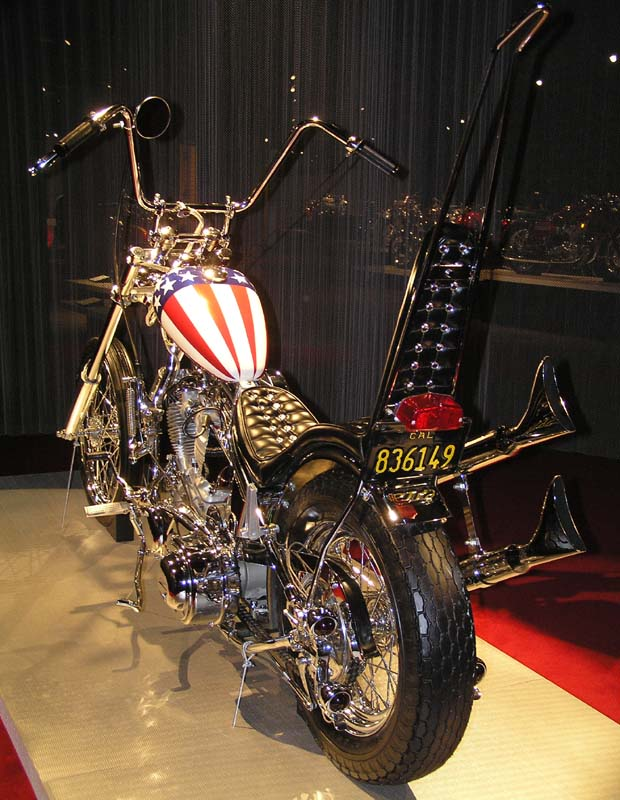
A 1969 Harley-Davidson chopper, a replica of the 'Captain America' bike from Easy Rider

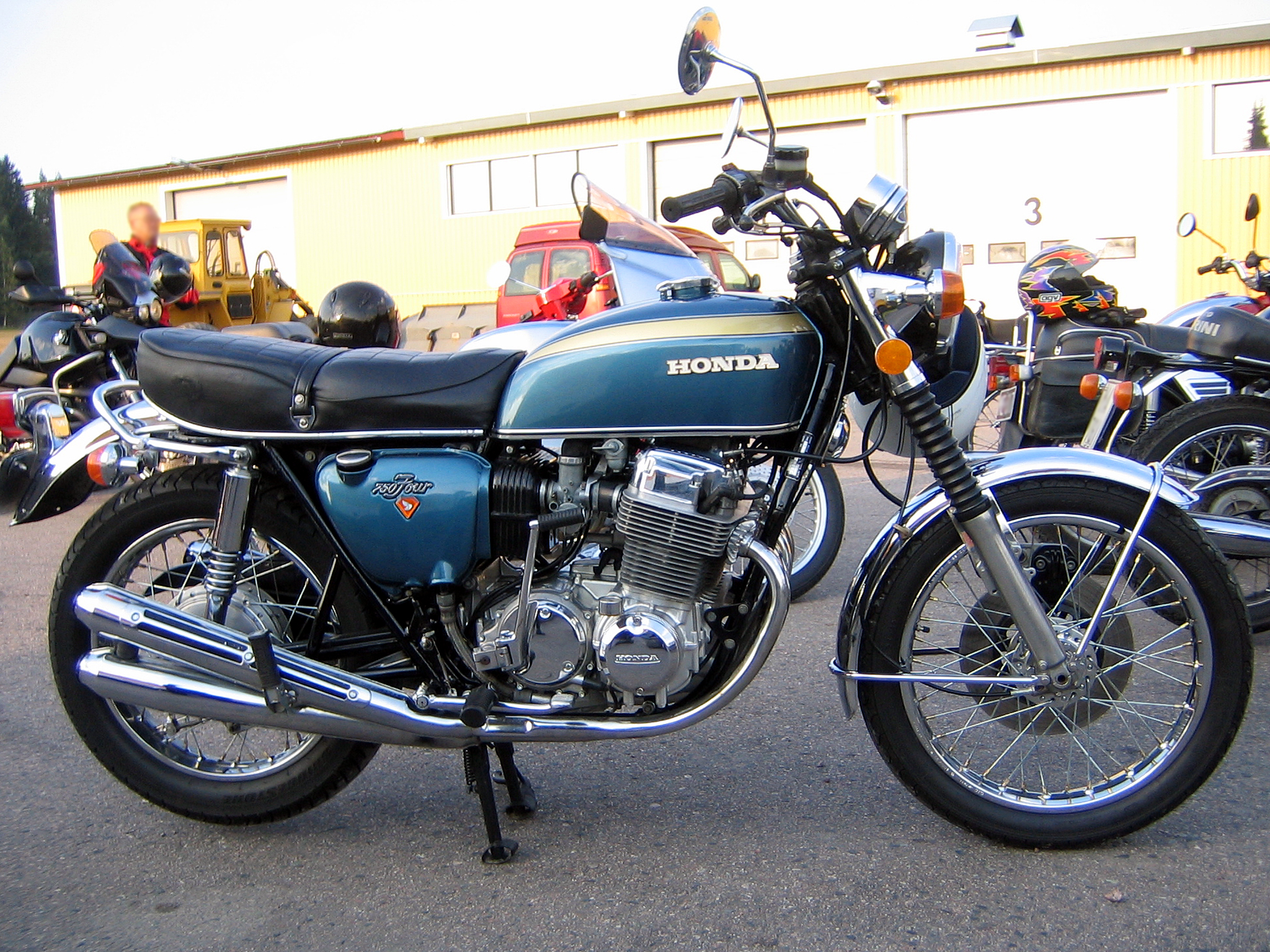
Honda CB750 inline four, the first to be called a 'superbike', and the archetypal Universal Japanese Motorcycle

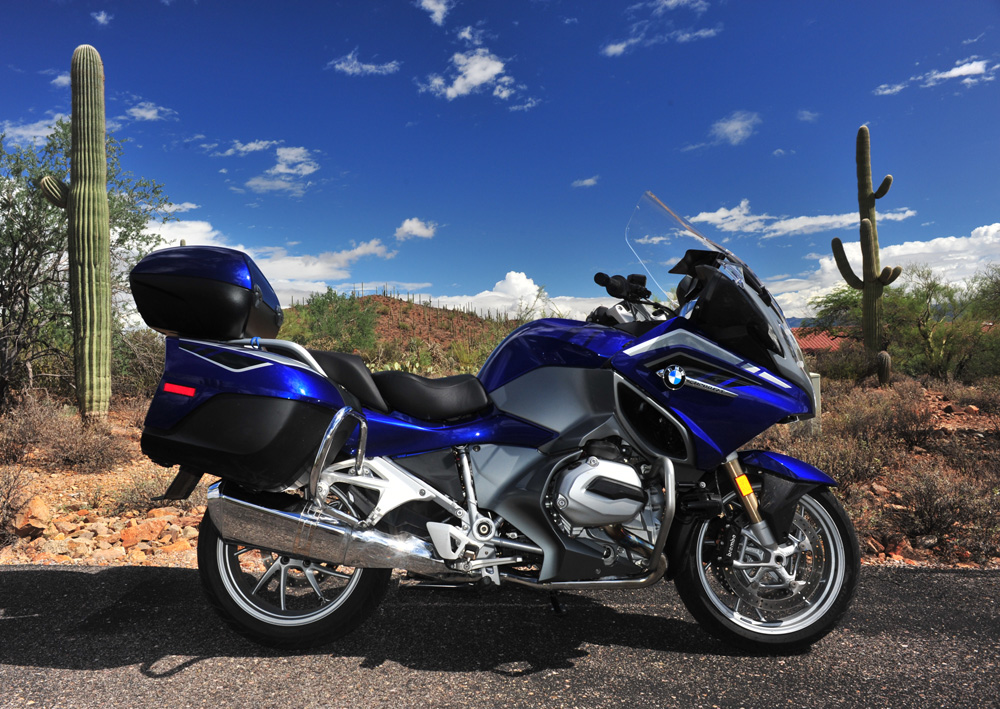
2015 BMW R1200RT Sport Touring Motorcycle

- Street motorcycle – designed for riding on paved roads; features smooth tyres with a light tread pattern and at least 125 cubic centimetres (7.6 cu in) engine.
  - Cruiser – mimics the style of American machines from the 1930s to the early 1960s, including those made by Harley-Davidson, Indian, Excelsior and Henderson; models evocative of the early cruisers make up 60% of the U.S. market
    - Bobber – usually has had the front fender removed, the rear fender 'bobbed' or made smaller, and all superfluous items removed to make it lighter
    - Chopper – has a longer frame design accompanied by a stretched front end (or rake). To achieve a longer front end, while the frame is being designed, the fabricator tilts the neck of the frame at less of an incline and installs a longer fork.
  - Sport bike – optimised for speed, acceleration, braking, and cornering on paved roads, typically at the expense of comfort and fuel economy in comparison to less specialised motorcycles.
    - Café racer – a type of motorcycle that has been modified for speed and good handling rather than comfort. Cafe racers' bodywork and control layout typically mimic the style of Grand Prix roadracers of the 1950s or 1960s with or without fairings. They tend to feature an elongated fuel tank, a small, rearward mounted and humped single seat, and low, race style handlebars mounted on the front forks.
    - Streetfighter – a sport bike that is customised by removing the fairing, with other changes that result in an overall more aggressive look
  - Touring motorcycle – designed for long-distance touring and heavy commuting; although any motorcycle can be ridden to tour or commute, manufacturers provide specific models designed to address these particular needs
    - Sport touring motorcycle – blends performance with long-distance capabilities while providing comfort and relative safety to the rider, and tend to include accessories, such as a trunk or saddlebags for storage, to enhance the touring experience
  - Standard motorcycle – versatile, general purpose street motorcycle, with an upright riding position.
    - Universal Japanese Motorcycle – Japanese motorcycle with a transverse air-cooled four-cylinder engine in a conventional tube frame with a dual seat, mostly made in the 1970s and early 1980s
- Custom motorcycle – unique or individually produced in a very limited quantity, as opposed to stock bikes which are mass-produced. Is usually highly stylised or has an unusual frame geometry or engine design. Many styles including café racer, streetfighter, and chopper began as customized motorcycles before manufacturers mass-produced bikes styled after popular custom machines.
  - Rat bike – motorcycle maintained at little to no cost, or often of a deliberately exaggerated state of disrepair
- Dual-sport motorcycle – type of street-legal motorcycle designed for both on and off-road use
  - Adventure (ADV) – a dual-purpose bike with a bias toward street use.
  - Supermoto motorcycle – a dual-purpose, single-cylinder, lightweight bike fitted with equipment better suited to street riding or racing such as 17-inch front wheel and road tyres
- Off-road motorcycle
  - Motocross – a lightweight, high-power, off-road competition race bike typically with a close ratio gear box.
  - Enduro motorcycle – motorcycle made specifically for the Enduro sport, with the long travel and medium-hard suspension of a motocross bike enhanced with motorcycle features such as a wide-ratio gear box, headlight and quiet muffler to make the bike street-legal for parts of the track
  - Track racing motorcycle – customised for track racing, with no brakes and fueled with methanol
  - Trials motorcycle – an extremely lightweight design, that lacks seating (designed to be ridden standing up) and that has suspension travel that is short, relative to a motocross or enduro motorcycle

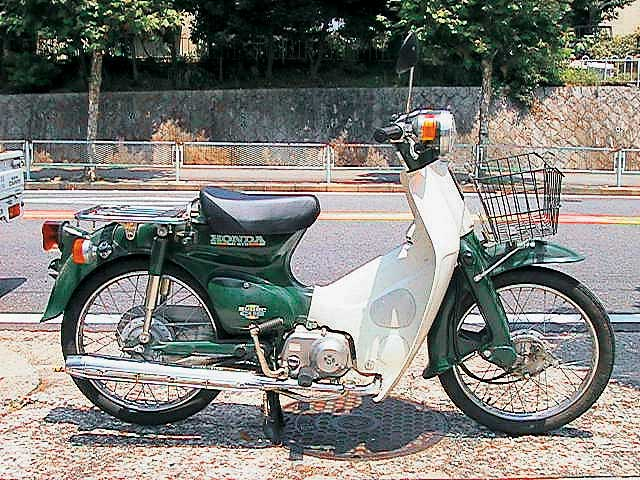
Honda Super Cub, the archetypal underbone and the world's best-selling motor vehicle

- Small class
  - Minibike – sometimes called a mini-moto or pocket-bike, it is a considerably smaller motorcycle; most traditional minibikes use a two stroke engine to turn the rear wheel via a chain
  - Mini chopper – mini choppers are scaled-down versions of choppers, and are usually constructed from 1" steel tubing or 3/4" steel black pipe; the tube or pipe is bent and then welded together to get the desired angles and shapes of the frame, which is usually custom made
  - Moped – a type of low-powered motorcycle designed to provide economical and relatively safe transport with minimal licensing requirements
    - Sport moped – a type of moped that resembles a sport bike
  - Pit bike – a small off-road motorcycle originally used for riding around the pits or staging area of a motocross race; since the early 2000s, pit bike racing, a sport similar to motocross, has become popular in the United States, especially in Southern California
  - Scooter – a step-through motorcycle with a seat, a floorboard, and small or low wheels. Most modern scooter designs have swingarm-mounted engines
  - Underbone – a step-through motorcycle with a structural down-tube and conventionally sized wheels, but without a floorboard
- Electric motorcycle – has an electric motor powered by one or more batteries or fuel cells
  - Electric dragbike
  - TTXGP race class
  - TT Zero race class
- Enclosed motorcycle
  - Cabin motorcycle
  - Streamliner motorcycle
- Utility motorcycle
  - Derny – motorised bicycle for motor-paced cycling events
  - Blood bike
  - Fire bike
  - Motocrotte – Parisian sanitation motorcycle
  - Motorcycle ambulance
  - Motorcycle taxi
  - Police motorcycle
- Other designs and variations
  - Feet forwards motorcycle – motorcycle on which the rider reclines with his feet positioned ahead of his body
- Related three-wheeled vehicles
  - Auto rickshaw
  - Motorcycle combination
  - Motorized tricycle
  - Tilting three-wheeler

=== Design ===
Motorcycle design

- Motorcycle dynamics
  - Shaft effect
- Motorcycle geometry
- Motorcycle testing and measurement

==== Major component parts ====
Motorcycle components

- Motorcycle brakes
  - Anti-lock braking system – fitted to many modern motorcycles
  - Combined braking system – links front and rear brake operation
- Motorcycle chassis – includes the frame and suspension, along with the front forks, of the vehicle.
  - Motorcycle frame – provides the strength and rigidity of the motorcycle; all other parts are attached directly or indirectly to the frame
  - Suspension – controls the ride and handling of the motorcycle by controlling the rate and distance of the movement of the wheels relative to the frame
  - Motorcycle fork – acts as suspension for the front wheel and allows the motorcycle to be steered
- Motorcycle engine – provides the power to propel the motorcycle
  - Forced induction in motorcycles – turbocharger or supercharger for greater power per unit displacement
- Motorcycle transmission
  - Chain drive – the most common method of transferring power from the engine to the wheels
  - Shaft drive – low-maintenance alternative to chain drive, favoured by certain manufacturers, such as BMW Motorrad and Moto Guzzi, and also used on many large touring motorcycles
  - Belt drive – low-maintenance alternative to chain drive, favoured by certain manufacturers, such as Harley-Davidson, and on many cruiser motorcycles
- Motorcycle handlebar
- Instrument panel
  - Speedometer – indicates the forward speed of the motorcycle
  - Odometer – records and indicates the total distance travelled by the motorcycle
  - Tachometer – indicates the rotational speed of the crankshaft in the engine, often also shows an indicated safe limit called a redline
  - Fuel gauge – indicates the amount of fuel in the tank relative to tank capacity
- Motorcycle saddle
- Motorcycle tyres – have a round cross section to facilitate the leaning necessary when a motorcycle turns
- Motorcycle wheels
- Motorcycle accessories
  - Motorcycle fairing
  - Motorcycle headlamp modulator
  - Sidecar
  - Storage accessories
    - Pannier
    - Saddlebags
    - Motorcycle trailer
    - Trunk

=== Models ===
- Category:Lists of motorcycles
- Category:Lists of motorcycles of the United Kingdom
- List of Grand Prix motorcycles

=== Manufacturers ===
- List of motorcycle manufacturers

=== History ===
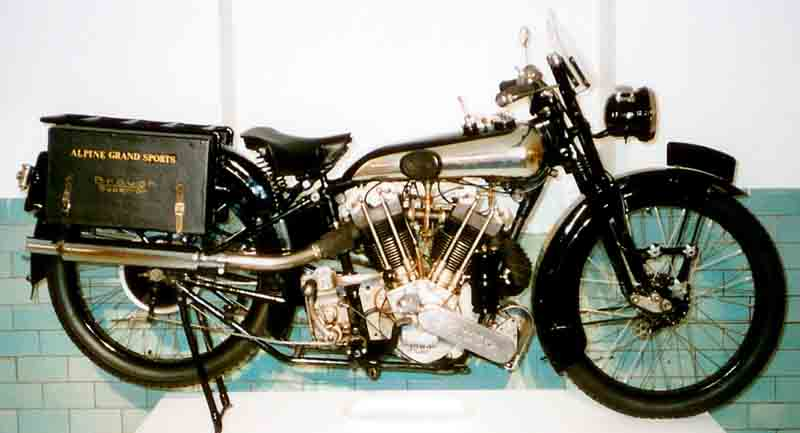
Brough Superior SS 100 1925

Motorcycle history

- Motorcycle land speed record
  - List of fastest production motorcycles
- History of electric motorcycles and scooters

==== Pioneers ====
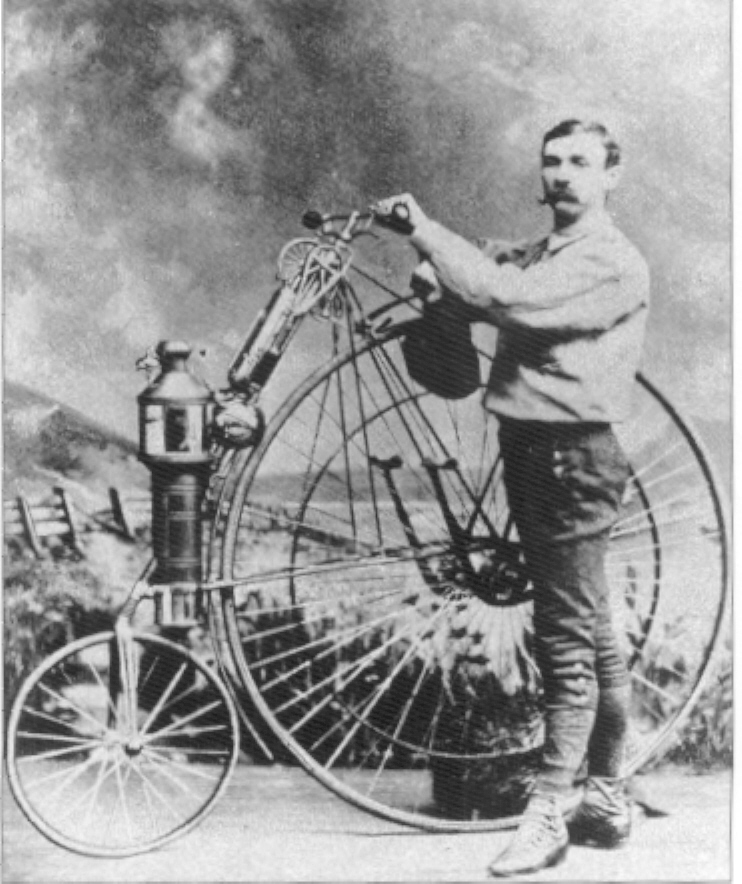
Lucius Copeland 1894

First motorcycle ride – it is generally accepted that the first motorcycle ride was by Gottlieb Daimler's son Paul on a new machine called Einspur ('one track') near Stuttgart in Germany on 10 November 1885. However, several pioneering engineers and inventors preceded Daimler, mostly with steam engines powering their cycles. These include:

- Lucius Copeland – 19th-century engineer and inventor from Phoenix who demonstrated one of the first motorcycles in 1884
- Louis-Guillaume Perreaux – French inventor and engineer who submitted one of the first patents for a working motorcycle in 1869, the Michaux-Perreaux steam velocipede.

Many pioneering engineers and inventors followed Daimler in using internal combustion engines . These include:

- Siegfried Bettmann – founder of the Triumph Motorcycle Company
- Oscar Hedstrom – designer and engineer who designed the Indian motorcycle, one of the first motorcycles manufactured in the United States
- Edward Pennington – pioneering motorcycle inventor credited with having invented the word 'motorcycle' and using the term as early as 1893
- Alfred Angas Scott – motorcycle designer, inventor and founder of the Scott Motorcycle Company

==== Innovators ====
- Max Friz – German mechanical engineer and contributor of engine design that led to the founding of BMW in 1917
- Harry Ricardo – pioneering motorcycle engine designer influential in the early years of the development of the internal combustion engine
- Edward Turner – motorcycle designer and General Manager of Triumph where he led the development of many important technical ideas found on motorcycles today
- John Britten – New Zealand mechanical engineer who designed a world-record-setting motorcycle with innovative features and materials
- Mike Tomkinson - motorcycle engineer whose Bol d'Or endurance racers incorporated numerous innovative features.
- David Garside - BSA engineer who developed the F&S Wankel into a powerful Norton motorcycle engine.

==== Industrialists ====
- George Brough – world record holding motorcycle racer and founder of Brough Superior motorcycles
- Arthur Davidson – co-founder of the Harley-Davidson Motor Company
- Eugene Goodman – co founder of the Velocette motorcycle company with his father John Goodman in 1913
- William S. Harley – co-founder of the Harley-Davidson Motor Company
- Soichiro Honda – founder of the Honda Motor Company
- Bert Hopwood – a British motorcycle designer who influenced development of the British motorcycle industry and worked for Ariel, Norton, BSA and Triumph
- Frantisek Janeček – founder of the Czech Jawa Motors
- James Lansdowne Norton – motorcycle designer, inventor and manufacturer of the Norton motorcycles
- Val Page – motorcycle designer and worked for most of the leading marques, including Ariel, Triumph and BSA
- Jack Sangster – industrialist who became an important figure in the history of the British motorcycle industry
- Phil Vincent – founder of Vincent Motorcycles, his designs influenced the development of motorcycles around the world

=== Museums and exhibitions ===
There are a number of museums which feature collections of motorcycles, either as part of a larger exhibition of vehicles, or dedicated entirely to motorcycles. Some of those museums are listed below:

- Barber Vintage Motorsports Museum
- Deutsches Zweirad- und NSU-Museum
- Evel Knievel Museum
- Finland's Motorcycle Museum
- Harley-Davidson Museum
- Honda Collection Hall
- Irbit State Motorcycle Museum
- Moto Guzzi Museum
- Motorcycle Hall of Fame
- National Motorcycle Museum (Anamosa, IA)
- National Motor Museum, Beaulieu
  - List of motorcycles in the National Motor Museum, Beaulieu
- National Motorcycle Museum (UK)
- Sammy Miller Motorcycle Museum
- The Art of the Motorcycle
  - List of motorcycles in The Art of the Motorcycle exhibition
- List of motorcycles in the Smithsonian Institution

== Motorcycling ==
Motorcycling

- Motorcycling advocacy
- Motorcycle lane

=== Safety ===
- Motorcycle safety
  - Countersteering
  - Hurt Report
  - Lane splitting
  - MAIDS report
  - Motorcycle training

==== Equipment ====
- Motorcycle personal protective equipment
  - Motorcycle helmet
  - Motorcycle boots
  - Motorcycle armor

==== Accidents ====
- Lowsider
- Highsider
- Motorcycle deaths in U.S. by year
- List of deaths by motorcycle accident

=== Types ===
- Motorcycle commuting
- Courier service by motorcycle
- Motorcycle rally
  - Sweep
- Motorcycle touring
- Trail riding – riding outdoors on natural trails and roads.

=== Sport ===
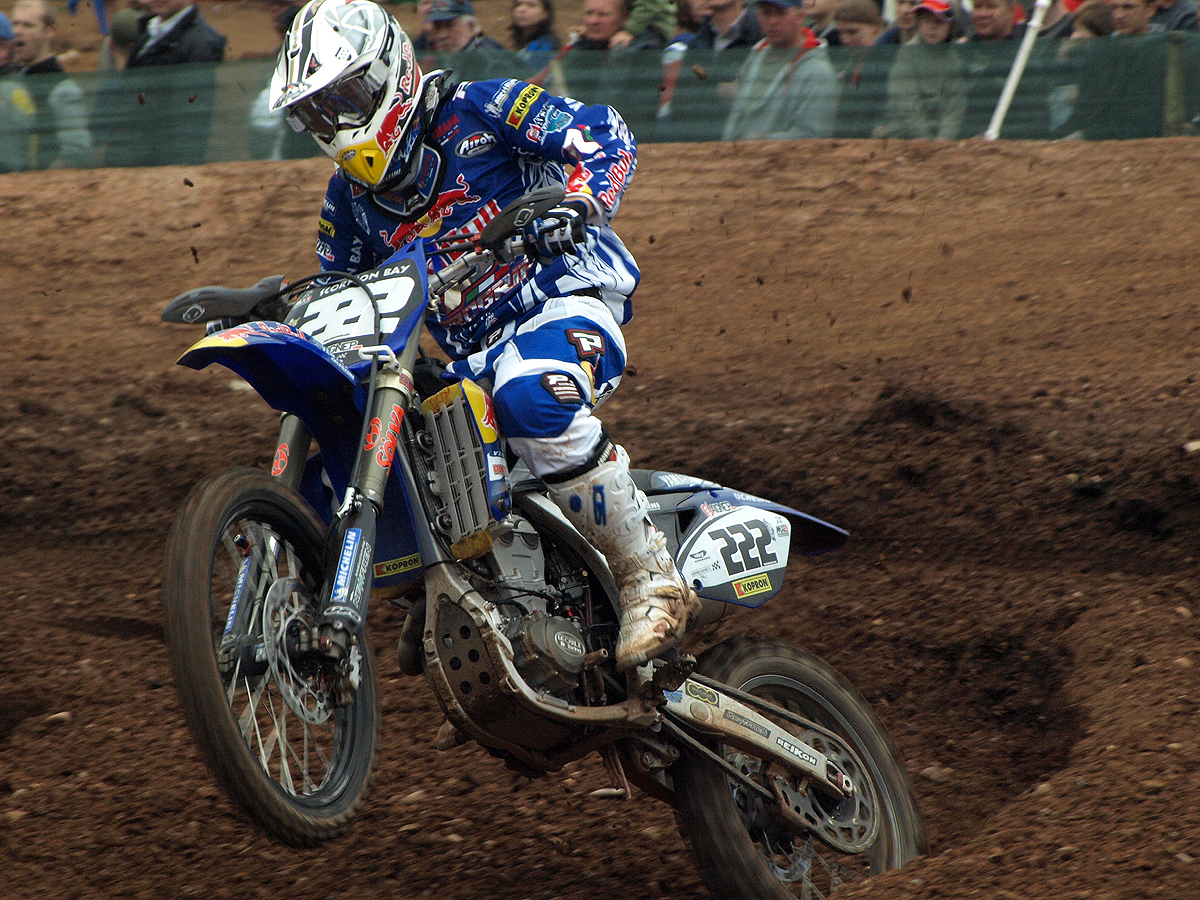
FIM Motocross World Championship, taking place at Mallory Park, England

Motorcycle sport – broad field that encompasses all sporting aspects of motorcycling. The various disciplines are not all races or timed-speed events, as several disciplines test a competitor's various riding skills. Riders have raced motorcycles for over a hundred years, with the first official competition recorded as the Paris–Rouen race in July 1894. This was quickly followed by races all over Europe and the US. In 1907, the Isle of Man TT races took over 66 kilometres (41 mi) of the island's roads and has continued since. Motorcycle sport now takes many different forms, including:

- Enduro
- Freestyle Motocross
- Land speed record – a single rider accelerates over a 1- to 3-mile (4.8 km) long straight track (usually on dry lake beds) and is timed for top speed through a trap at the end of the run. The rider must exceed the previous top speed record for that class or type of bike for their name to be placed on the record books.
  - Motorcycle land speed record
- Motoball (Motorcycle Polo) – similar to football, but all players (except goalkeepers) ride motorcycles, and the ball is much bigger.
- Motorcycle trials
- Motorcycle stunt riding
  - Wheelie
  - Stoppie
  - Burnout
- Category:Motorcycle sport lists

==== Racing ====
Motorcycle racing – motorcycle sport involving racing motorcycles, on or off a track.

- Motorcycle drag racing
  - Pro Stock Motorcycle
- Road racing
  - Grand Prix motorcycle racing
  - Superbike racing
  - Isle of Man TT
  - TTXGP
  - North West 200
  - Ulster Grand Prix
- Motocross
  - Motocross World Championship
  - Motocross des Nations
  - AMA Motocross Championship
  - Trans-AMA Motocross Championship
  - AMA Supercross Championship
- Pit bike racing – competition sport similar to motocross, using pit bikes
- Track racing
  - Motorcycle speedway
  - Speedway Grand Prix
  - Speedway World Cup
  - SGB Premiership
  - AMA Grand National Championship
  - Grasstrack
  - Ice speedway
- Enduro
  - World Enduro Championship
  - International Six Days Enduro
  - Grand National Cross Country
  - Erzberg Rodeo
  - Red Bull Romaniacs Hard Enduro Rallye
  - Endurocross
- Motorcycle trials
  - FIM Trial World Championship
- Motorcycle land-speed record - Encapsulating the sport of Motorcycle Land Speed Racing
  - Bonneville Speedway - Location of the Southern California Timing Association Speed Week, USFRA World of Speed and Bonneville Motorcycle Speed Trials
  - El Mirage Lake - San Bernardino County, California
  - Lake Gairdner - Australia

=== Organisations and clubs ===
Although motorcycling can be a solitary form of transport, there are clubs for almost every aspect; including charities, social clubs, criminal or outlaw clubs, lobby groups that guard against restrictive legislation, and specialist clubs for specific makes or types of motorcycle. Examples include:

==== Organisations ====
Logo of the British Motorcyclists Federation (BMF)

- American Motorcyclist Association (AMA)
- British Motorcyclists Federation (BMF) – a UK-based campaigner and lobby group for motorcyclists' rights
- Fédération Internationale de Motocyclisme (FIM) – the worldwide body responsible for governing motorcycle sport
- State motorcyclists' rights organizations – 32 organisations in the U.S., 25 of which are known as ABATE, which were initially formed to fight motorcycle helmet laws

==== Motorcycle clubs ====
Motorcycle club – group of individuals whose primary interest and activities involve motorcycles.

- List of Motorcycle Club terms
- List of motorcycle clubs – examples of motorcycle clubs include:
  - Antique Motorcycle Club of America
  - BMW Motorcycle Owners of America – a single marque club for owners of BMW motorcycles
  - Freewheelers EVS – a UK-based club whose members volunteer to transport blood between hospitals
  - Harley Owners Group – a worldwide club run by Harley-Davidson for owners of its motorcycles
  - Patriot Guard Riders – formed in 2005 to provide an honour guard at the funerals of repatriated military personnel in the U.S.
  - List of outlaw motorcycle clubs
    - Hells Angels – a worldwide outlaw motorcycle club founded in 1948

=== Notable motorcyclists ===
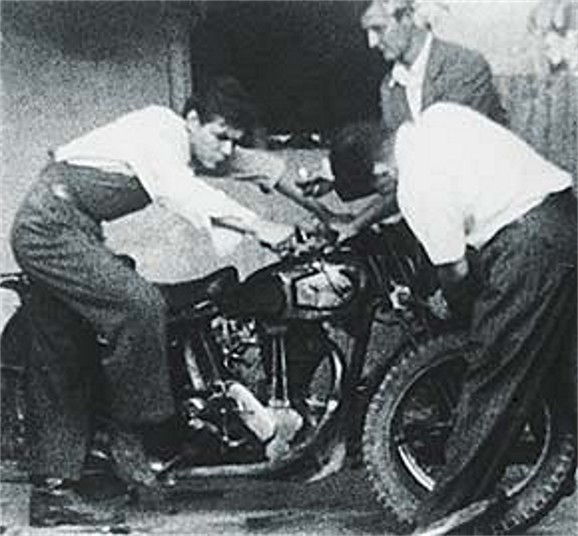
Ernesto 'Che' Guevara (left) holding the handlebars of his 500 cc single cylinder Norton motorcycle

- Sonny Barger – Hells Angel
- Marlon Brando – actor
- Peter Fonda – actor, star of Easy Rider
- Malcolm Forbes – capitalist, leader of the first group of foreigners permitted to tour Soviet Union by motorcycle
- Che Guevara – revolutionary, inspired by witnessing peasants' living conditions during 8,000 km ride across South America
- Harry Hurt – safety researcher and author of the Hurt Report
- T. E. Lawrence – Lawrence of Arabia
- Jay Leno – talk show host, rare motorcycle collector
- Ewan McGregor – actor, marathon international motorcycle trips
- Steve McQueen – actor and motorcycle racer and collector
- Ted Simon – British journalist known for circumnavigating the world by motorcycle and for documenting his journey in the book Jupiter's Travels
- Bessie Stringfield – early black woman motorcyclist and long-distance rider
- Hunter S. Thompson – author and journalist
- Van Buren sisters – first women to ride across the U.S. in 1916

=== Notable motorcycle sportspersons ===
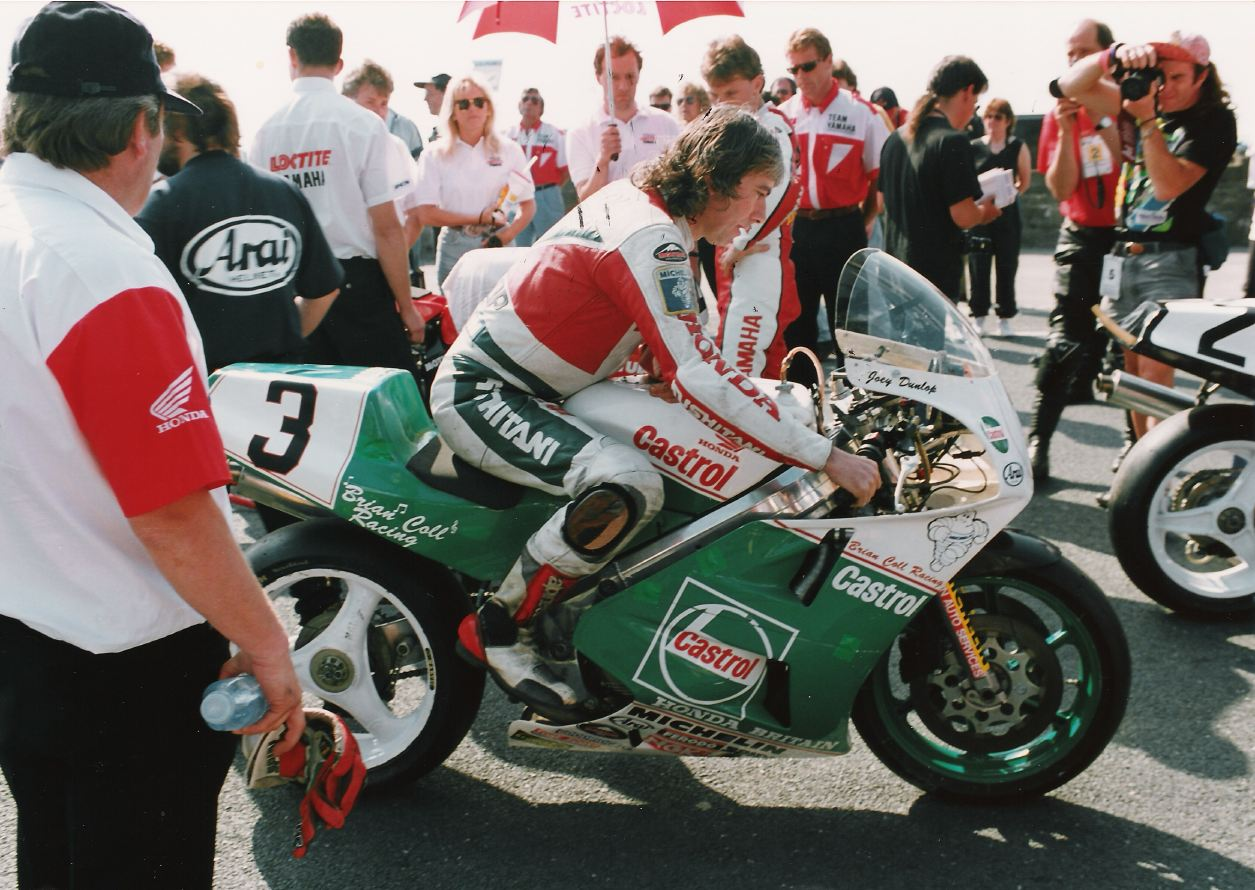
Joey Dunlop on his Honda RC30 ready for the Senior TT

- Giacomo Agostini – Grand Prix motorcycle racer, winner of fifteen World Championship titles and 122 Grand Prix race wins
- Erwin 'Cannonball' Baker – US promotional rider known for setting transcontinental speed records on motorcycles and in cars in the early 20th century
- Toni Bou – winner of thirteen trial World Championship titles
- Ricky Carmichael – very successful motocross racer
- Geoff Duke – Grand Prix motorcycle racer, winner of six World Championship titles, and the first racer to wear a one-piece leather racing suit
- Michael Dunlop - motorcycle racer who won the most races (as of 2025) at the Isle of Man TT surpassing his uncle Joey.
- Joey Dunlop – motorcycle racer who won 26 races at the Isle of Man Tourist Trophy meets
- Bud Ekins – stunt rider and stunt coordinator
- Stefan Everts – winner of ten FIM Motocross World Championship titles
- Carl Fogarty – superbike racer, four-time World Superbike champion
- Mike Hailwood – Grand Prix motorcycle racer, winner of 9 World Championship titles and 14 Isle of Man TT races; first to win 3 races at one IoM TT, in 1961 (125 cc, 250 cc, and 500 cc)
- Ernst Jakob Henne – a German motorcycle racer in the 1920s
- Aleš Hlad, Slovenian supermoto racer, 2005 European Champion and winner of the 2007 Athens GP
- Dougie Lampkin – winner of twelve trial World Championship titles
- Mary McGee -first woman to officially race motorcycles
- John McGuinness successful road racer at the Isle of Man TT, the North West 200, the Macau Grand Prix and the Bol d'Or.
- Guy Martin - an English motorcycle racer and television personality.
- Sammy Miller, MBE – motorcycle sportsperson, museum collector, patron of the National Association for Bikers with a Disability (NABD)
- Evel Knievel – stunt rider known for jumping motorcycles over tall, long, or otherwise dangerous obstacles; and for multiple injuries from bad landings
- Urs Pedraita – motorcycle pilot known for long-distance records
- Phil Read - motorcycle racer who successfully competed in MotoGPs, the Isle of Man TT and in Bol d'Or endurance races.
- Valentino Rossi – Grand Prix motorcycle racer, winner of nine World Championship titles and 111 Grand Prix races
- Kenny Roberts – first American to win a motorcycle Grand Prix, winner of the AMA Grand Slam, racing team owner and safety advocate
- Juha Salminen – winner of thirteen World Enduro Championship titles
- Barry Sheene – Grand Prix motorcycle racer, winner of three World Championship titles
- John Surtees – Grand Prix motorcycle racer, winner of seven World Championship titles; the only racer to have won world championship titles on both two and four wheels
- Mick Doohan – Grand Prix motorcycle racer, winner of five World Championship titles
- Kari Tiainen – winner of seven World Enduro Championship titles

==== Motocross riders ====
- List of motocross riders

=== Motorcycling in the media ===
==== Film ====
- The Wild One – the influence of motorcycle movies can be traced to this movie starring Marlon Brando in 1954 which helped to turn motorcycling into a rebellious lifestyle culture which US censor boards allowed 'with caution', but in the United Kingdom, the film was banned by the British Board of Film Censors for fourteen years. It finally got an 'X' certificate in November, 1967. Other influential motorcycle movies include:
- Easy Rider
- Electra Glide in Blue
- On Any Sunday
- No Limit
- Silver Dream Racer
- The Girl on a Motorcycle
- The Great Escape
- The Leather Boys
- The Motorcycle Diaries
- The World's Fastest Indian
- TT3D: Closer to the Edge
- Beyond The Law

==== Television programmes ====
- American Chopper
- CHiPs
- Feasting on Asphalt
- Full Throttle Saloon
- Long Way Round and Long Way Down
- Ride with Norman Reedus
- Sons of Anarchy
- Street Hawk
- Then Came Bronson

==== Documentaries ====
- Hard Miles and Hard Miles 2

==== Books ====
- Ghost Rider: Travels on the Healing Road by Neil Peart
- Hell's Angels: The Strange and Terrible Saga of the Outlaw Motorcycle Gangs by Hunter S. Thompson
- Jupiter's Travels by Ted Simon
- The Motorcycle Diaries by Che Guevara
- Three-Wheeling Through Africa by James C. Wilson
- Zen and the Art of Motorcycle Maintenance by Robert M. Pirsig

==== Exhibitions ====
- The Art of the Motorcycle Solomon R. Guggenheim Museum and others
