= 2020 Brazilian Superbike Championship =

Superbike championship

The 2020 Brazilian Superbike Championship was the 11th edition of the Brazilian Superbike Championship.

== Calendar ==
Round	Date	Circuit	City
1	August 30	Autódromo Internacional de Interlagos	São Paulo, SP
2	September 6	Autódromo Ayrton Senna	Goiânia, GO
3	September 27	Autódromo Internacional de Interlagos	São Paulo, SP
4	October 18	Autódromo Internacional de Interlagos	São Paulo, SP
5	November 8	Autódromo Internacional de Interlagos	São Paulo, SP
6	November 22	Autódromo Internacional de Curitiba	Curitiba, PR
7	December 6	Autódromo Internacional Potenza	Lima Duarte, MG
8	December 20	Autódromo Ayrton Senna	Goiânia, GO

== Results ==
=== Superbike ===
Round	Circuit	Date	Pole position	Fastest lap	Winning rider	Winning team	Winning constructor	Ref.
1	(São Paulo (state)) Autódromo Internacional de Interlagos	August 30	(Brazil) Eric Granado	(Brazil) Eric Granado	(Brazil) Eric Granado	(Brazil) Honda Racing	(Japan) Honda	
2	(Goiás) Autódromo Ayrton Senna	September 6	(Brazil) Eric Granado	(Brazil) Eric Granado	(Brazil) Eric Granado	(Brazil) Honda Racing	(Japan) Honda	
3	(São Paulo (state)) Autódromo Internacional de Interlagos	September 27	(Brazil) Eric Granado	(Brazil) Eric Granado	(Brazil) Eric Granado	(Brazil) Honda Racing	(Japan) Honda	
4	(São Paulo (state)) Autódromo Internacional de Interlagos	October 18	(Brazil) Pedro Sampaio	(Brazil) Pedro Sampaio	(Brazil) Pedro Sampaio	(Brazil) Honda Racing	(Japan) Honda	
5	(São Paulo (state)) Autódromo Internacional de Interlagos	November 8	(Brazil) Eric Granado	(Brazil) Eric Granado	(Brazil) Eric Granado	(Brazil) Honda Racing	(Japan) Honda	
6	(Paraná (state)) Autódromo Internacional de Curitiba	November 22	(Brazil) Eric Granado	(Brazil) Eric Granado	(Brazil) Eric Granado	(Brazil) Honda Racing	(Japan) Honda	
7	(Minas Gerais) Autódromo Internacional Potenza	December 6	(Brazil) Eric Granado	(Brazil) Eric Granado	(Brazil) Eric Granado	(Brazil) Honda Racing	(Japan) Honda	
8	(Goiás) Autódromo Ayrton Senna	December 20	(Brazil) Eric Granado	(Brazil) Eric Granado	(Brazil) Eric Granado	(Brazil) Honda Racing	(Japan) Honda	

=== Superbike Master Senior ===
Ronda	Circuito	Fecha	Pole Position	Vuelta rápida	Piloto ganador	Equipo ganador	Constructor	Ref.
1	(São Paulo (state)) Grande Prêmio de São Paulo	28 de agosto	(Argentina) Lautaro Costanzo	(Argentina) Thiago Chiani	(Argentina) Thiago Chiani	(Argentina) Paladini Racing	(Italy) Ducati	
2	Grande Prêmio de Goiás	4 de septiembre	(Brazil) Alex Barros	(United States) Kaveh Rad	(Mexico) Richard Sánchez	(Mexico) Blanco Racing	(Japan) Kawasaki	
3	(São Paulo (state)) Grande Prêmio Petrobras	26 de septiembre	(Brazil) Alex Barros	(France) Antoine Hoppenot	(Mexico) Richard Sánchez	(Mexico) Blanco Racing	(Japan) Kawasaki	
4	(São Paulo (state)) Grande Prêmio Elf	16 de octubre	(Brazil) Alex Barros	(Brazil) Alex Barros	(Argentina) Lautaro Costanzo	(Malaysia) Petronas Team	(Germany) BMW	
5	(São Paulo (state)) Grande Prêmio de Interlagos	6 de noviembre	(Brazil) Alex Barros	(Argentina) Lautaro Costanzo	(Brazil) Murilo Moretto	(Malaysia) Petronas Team	(Germany) BMW	
6	(Paraná (state)) Grande Prêmio de Curitiba	20 de noviembre	(Brazil) Alex Barros	(Brazil) Alex Barros	(Argentina) Lautaro Costanzo	(Malaysia) Petronas Team	(Germany) BMW	
7	Grande Prêmio de Minas Gerais	5 de diciembre	(Brazil) Alex Barros	(Brazil) Alex Barros	(Brazil) Alex Barros	(Brazil) Alex Barros Racing	(Germany) BMW	
8	(Goiás) Grande Prêmio de Goiânia	18 de diciembre	(Argentina) Lautaro Costanzo	(Brazil) Alex Barros	(Brazil) Alex Barros	(Brazil) Alex Barros Racing	(Germany) BMW	

=== Superbike Light ===
Ronda	Circuito	Fecha	Pole Position	Vuelta rápida	Piloto ganador	Equipo ganador	Constructor	Ref.
1	(São Paulo (state)) Grande Prêmio de São Paulo	28 de agosto	(Brazil) André Veríssimo	(Brazil) André Veríssimo	(Brazil) André Veríssimo	(Brazil) PSBK Racing	(Japan) Kawasaki	
2	Grande Prêmio de Goiás	4 de septiembre	(Brazil) André Veríssimo	(Brazil) Juracy Rodrigues "Black"	(Brazil) Juracy Rodrigues "Black"	(Brazil) PRT	(Japan) Kawasaki	
3	(São Paulo (state)) Grande Prêmio Petrobras	26 de septiembre	(Brazil) André Veríssimo	(Brazil) André Veríssimo	(Brazil) André Veríssimo	(Brazil) PSBK Racing	(Japan) Kawasaki	
4	(São Paulo (state)) Grande Prêmio Elf	16 de octubre	(Brazil) André Veríssimo	(Brazil) André Veríssimo	(Brazil) André Veríssimo	(Brazil) PSBK Racing	(Japan) Kawasaki	
5	(São Paulo (state)) Grande Prêmio de Interlagos	6 de noviembre	(Brazil) Rodrigo Dazzi	(Brazil) André Veríssimo	(Brazil) André Veríssimo	(Brazil) PSBK Racing	(Japan) Kawasaki	
6	(Paraná (state)) Grande Prêmio de Curitiba	20 de noviembre	(Brazil) André Veríssimo	(Brazil) André Veríssimo	(Brazil) André Veríssimo	(Brazil) PSBK Racing	(Japan) Kawasaki	
7	Grande Prêmio de Minas Gerais	5 de diciembre	(Brazil) André Veríssimo	(Brazil) Manow Martins	(Brazil) Osvaldo Jorge "Duende"	(Brazil) Duende Racing	(Japan) Kawasaki	
8	(Goiás) Grande Prêmio de Goiânia	18 de diciembre	(Brazil) Rafael Palmieri "Rizada"	(Brazil) André Veríssimo	(Brazil) Osvaldo Jorge "Duende"	(Brazil) Duende Racing	(Japan) Kawasaki	

=== Supersport 600 ===
Ronda	Circuito	Fecha	Pole Position	Vuelta rápida	Piloto ganador	Equipo ganador	Constructor	Ref.
1	(São Paulo (state)) Grande Prêmio de São Paulo	28 de agosto	(Brazil) Leonardo Tamburro	(Brazil) Leonardo Tamburro	(Brazil) Leonardo Tamburro	(Brazil) Kawasaki Racing Brasil	(Japan) Kawasaki	
2	Grande Prêmio de Goiás	4 de septiembre	(Brazil) Leonardo Tamburro	(Brazil) Leonardo Tamburro	(Brazil) Leonardo Tamburro	(Brazil) Kawasaki Racing Brasil	(Japan) Kawasaki	
3	(São Paulo (state)) Grande Prêmio Petrobras	26 de septiembre	(Brazil) Leonardo Tamburro	(Brazil) Leonardo Tamburro	(Brazil) Leonardo Tamburro	(Brazil) Kawasaki Racing Brasil	(Japan) Kawasaki	
4	(São Paulo (state)) Grande Prêmio Elf	16 de octubre	(Brazil) Leonardo Tamburro	(Brazil) Leonardo Tamburro	(Brazil) Leonardo Tamburro	(Brazil) Kawasaki Racing Brasil	(Japan) Kawasaki	
5	(São Paulo (state)) Grande Prêmio de Interlagos	6 de noviembre	(Brazil) Leonardo Tamburro	(Brazil) Leonardo Tamburro	(Brazil) Leonardo Tamburro	(Brazil) Kawasaki Racing Brasil	(Japan) Kawasaki	
6	(Paraná (state)) Grande Prêmio de Curitiba	20 de noviembre	(Brazil) Leonardo Tamburro	(Brazil) Leonardo Tamburro	(Brazil) Leonardo Tamburro	(Brazil) Kawasaki Racing Brasil	(Japan) Kawasaki	
7	Grande Prêmio de Minas Gerais	5 de diciembre	(Brazil) Leonardo Tamburro	(Brazil) Leonardo Tamburro	(Brazil) Leonardo Tamburro	(Brazil) Kawasaki Racing Brasil	(Japan) Kawasaki	
8	(Goiás) Grande Prêmio de Goiânia	18 de diciembre	(Brazil) Leonardo Tamburro	(Brazil) Leonardo Tamburro	(Brazil) Leonardo Tamburro	(Brazil) Kawasaki Racing Brasil	(Japan) Kawasaki	

=== Supersport 400 ===
Ronda	Circuito	Fecha	Pole Position	Vuelta rápida	Piloto ganador	Equipo ganador	Constructor	Ref.
1	(São Paulo (state)) Grande Prêmio de São Paulo	28 de agosto	(Brazil) Felipe Gonçalves	(Brazil) Lincoln Lima Melo	(Brazil) Lincoln Lima Melo	(Brazil) Tecfil Racing Team	(Japan) Kawasaki	
2	Grande Prêmio de Goiás	4 de septiembre	(Brazil) Christian Cerciari	(Brazil) Christian Cerciari	(Brazil) Raquel Vaz	(Brazil) PSBK Racing	(Japan) Kawasaki	
3	(São Paulo (state)) Grande Prêmio Petrobras	26 de septiembre	(Brazil) Felipe Gonçalves	(Brazil) Felipe Gonçalves	(Brazil) Felipe Gonçalves	(Brazil) PSBK Racing	(Japan) Kawasaki	
4	(São Paulo (state)) Grande Prêmio Elf	16 de octubre	(Brazil) Felipe Gonçalves	(Brazil) Felipe Gonçalves	(Brazil) Felipe Gonçalves	(Brazil) PSBK Racing	(Japan) Kawasaki	
5	(São Paulo (state)) Grande Prêmio de Interlagos	6 de noviembre	(Brazil) Arthur Costa	(Brazil) João Pedro Arratia	(Brazil) Felipe Gonçalves	(Brazil) PSBK Racing	(Japan) Kawasaki	
6	(Paraná (state)) Grande Prêmio de Curitiba	20 de noviembre	(Brazil) Felipe Gonçalves	(Brazil) Felipe Gonçalves	(Brazil) Felipe Gonçalves	(Brazil) PSBK Racing	(Japan) Kawasaki	
7	Grande Prêmio de Minas Gerais	5 de diciembre	(Uruguay) Facundo Llambías	(Brazil) Lincoln Lima Melo	(Brazil) Lincoln Lima Melo	(Brazil) Tecfil Racing Team	(Japan) Kawasaki	
8	(Goiás) Grande Prêmio de Goiânia	18 de diciembre	(Brazil) Felipe Gonçalves	(Uruguay) Facundo Llambías	(Uruguay) Facundo Llambías	(Brazil) RXP/TRH Racing	(Japan) Kawasaki	

=== Copa Honda CBR 650R ===
Ronda	Circuito	Fecha	Pole Position	Vuelta rápida	Piloto ganador	Equipo ganador	Constructor	Ref.
1	(São Paulo (state)) Grande Prêmio de São Paulo	28 de agosto	(Brazil) Guilherme Brito	(Brazil) Guilherme Brito	(Brazil) Guilherme Brito	(Brazil) Motonil Motors	(Japan) Honda	
2	Grande Prêmio de Goiás	4 de septiembre	(Brazil) Rafael Rigueiro	(Brazil) Rafael Rigueiro	(Brazil) Guilherme Brito	(Brazil) Motonil Motors	(Japan) Honda	
3	(São Paulo (state)) Grande Prêmio Petrobras	26 de septiembre	(Brazil) Guilherme Brito	(Brazil) Rafael Rigueiro	(Brazil) Guilherme Brito	(Brazil) Motonil Motors	(Japan) Honda	
4	(São Paulo (state)) Grande Prêmio Elf	16 de octubre	(Brazil) Rafael Rigueiro	(Brazil) Guilherme Brito	(Brazil) Guilherme Brito	(Brazil) Motonil Motors	(Japan) Honda	
5	(São Paulo (state)) Grande Prêmio de Interlagos	6 de noviembre	(Brazil) João Vítor Carneiro	(Brazil) Rafael Rigueiro	(Brazil) Rafael Rigueiro	(Brazil) PRT	(Japan) Honda	
6	(Paraná (state)) Grande Prêmio de Curitiba	20 de noviembre	(Brazil) Théo Manna	(Brazil) Théo Manna	(Brazil) Théo Manna	(Brazil) Tecfil Racing Team	(Japan) Honda	
7	Grande Prêmio de Minas Gerais	5 de diciembre	(Brazil) João Vítor Carneiro	(Brazil) João Vítor Carneiro	(Brazil) Lucas Torres	(Brazil) PRT	(Japan) Honda	
8	(Goiás) Grande Prêmio de Goiânia	18 de diciembre	(Brazil) Guilherme Brito	(Brazil) Rafael Rigueiro	(Brazil) Rafael Rigueiro	(Brazil) PRT	(Japan) Honda	

=== Copa Honda CBR 650R EVO ===
Ronda	Circuito	Fecha	Pole Position	Vuelta rápida	Piloto ganador	Equipo ganador	Constructor	Ref.
1	(São Paulo (state)) Grande Prêmio de São Paulo	28 de agosto	(Brazil) Daniel Rechenmacher	(Brazil) Daniel Rechenmacher	(Brazil) Daniel Rechenmacher	(Brazil) AOA Racing	(Japan) Honda	
2	Grande Prêmio de Goiás	4 de septiembre	(Italy) Leonardo Capezzi	(Italy) Leonardo Capezzi	(Italy) Leonardo Capezzi	(Italy) TechSport Racing	(Japan) Honda	
3	(São Paulo (state)) Grande Prêmio Petrobras	26 de septiembre	(Italy) Leonardo Capezzi	(Brazil) Luís Diego Soares	(Italy) Leonardo Capezzi	(Italy) TechSport Racing	(Japan) Honda	
4	(São Paulo (state)) Grande Prêmio Elf	16 de octubre	(Brazil) Daniel Rechenmacher	(Colombia) Yeferson Paz	(Brazil) Daniel Rechenmacher	(Brazil) AOA Racing	(Japan) Honda	
5	(São Paulo (state)) Grande Prêmio de Interlagos	6 de noviembre	(Brazil) Daniel Rechenmacher	(Brazil) Reni Wegmann	(Brazil) Adelmo Souza	(Brazil) Martella Motorsports	(Japan) Honda	
6	(Paraná (state)) Grande Prêmio de Curitiba	20 de noviembre	(Brazil) Marcelo Garcia	(Italy) Leonardo Capezzi	(Mexico) Miguel Carreón	(United States) LA Honda World Racing	(Japan) Honda	
7	Grande Prêmio de Minas Gerais	5 de diciembre	(Mexico) Miguel Carreón	(Mexico) Miguel Carreón	(Mexico) Miguel Carreón	(United States) LA Honda World Racing	(Japan) Honda	
8	(Goiás) Grande Prêmio de Goiânia	18 de diciembre	(Italy) Leonardo Capezzi	(Italy) Leonardo Capezzi	(Italy) Leonardo Capezzi	(Italy) TechSport Racing	(Japan) Honda	

=== Superbike Escola ===
Ronda	Circuito	Fecha	Pole Position	Vuelta rápida	Piloto ganador	Equipo ganador	Constructor	Ref.
1	(São Paulo (state)) Grande Prêmio de São Paulo	28 de agosto	(Brazil) Wesley Lima Silva	(Brazil) Wesley Lima Silva	(Brazil) Wesley Lima Silva	(Brazil) Sport Plus	(Germany) BMW	
2	Grande Prêmio de Goiás	4 de septiembre	(Brazil) Marcelo Augusto dos Santos Oliveira	(Brazil) Christian Simonit "Gringo"	(Argentina) Franco Pandolfino	Qatar Racing	(Japan) Yamaha	
3	(São Paulo (state)) Grande Prêmio Petrobras	26 de septiembre	(Brazil) Leandro Pardini	(Brazil) Leandro Pardini	(Brazil) Leandro Pardini	(Brazil) Scuderia Famiglia Pardini	(Germany) BMW	
4	(São Paulo (state)) Grande Prêmio Elf	16 de octubre	(Brazil) Leandro Pardini	(Brazil) Leandro Pardini	(Brazil) Leandro Pardini	(Brazil) Scuderia Famiglia Pardini	(Germany) BMW	
5	(São Paulo (state)) Grande Prêmio de Interlagos	6 de noviembre	(Brazil) Leandro Pardini	(Brazil) Leandro Pardini	(Brazil) Leandro Pardini	(Brazil) Scuderia Famiglia Pardini	(Germany) BMW	
6	(Paraná (state)) Grande Prêmio de Curitiba	20 de noviembre	(Brazil) Danilo Brum	(Brazil) Everton Nicks	(Brazil) Danilo Brum	(Brazil) Tom Racing	(Japan) Kawasaki	
7	Grande Prêmio de Minas Gerais	5 de diciembre	(Brazil) Leandro Pardini	(Brazil) Marcelo Augusto dos Santos Oliveira	(Brazil) Demétrius Machado	(Brazil) Mágico Racing	(Germany) BMW	
8	(Goiás) Grande Prêmio de Goiânia	18 de diciembre	(Brazil) Leandro Pardini	(Brazil) Leandro Pardini	(Brazil) Leandro Pardini	(Brazil) Scuderia Famiglia Pardini	(Germany) BMW	

=== Honda Junior Cup ===
Ronda	Circuito	Fecha	Pole Position	Vuelta rápida	Piloto ganador	Equipo ganador	Constructor	Ref.
1	(São Paulo (state)) Grande Prêmio de São Paulo	28 de agosto	(Brazil) João Teixeira	(Brazil) João Teixeira	(Brazil) João Teixeira	(Brazil) Certainty Racing	(Japan) Honda	
2	Grande Prêmio de Goiás	4 de septiembre	(Brazil) João Teixeira	(Brazil) Cauã Buzzo	(Brazil) João Teixeira	(Brazil) Certainty Racing	(Japan) Honda	
3	(São Paulo (state)) Grande Prêmio Petrobras	26 de septiembre	(Brazil) João Teixeira	(Brazil) João Teixeira	(Brazil) João Teixeira	(Brazil) Certainty Racing	(Japan) Honda	
4	(São Paulo (state)) Grande Prêmio Elf	16 de octubre	(Brazil) João Teixeira	(Brazil) Guilherme Fernandes "Foguetinho"	(Brazil) Guilherme Fernandes "Foguetinho"	(Brazil) Spirit Racing	(Japan) Honda	
5	(São Paulo (state)) Grande Prêmio de Interlagos	6 de noviembre	(Brazil) João Teixeira	(Brazil) Guilherme Fernandes "Foguetinho"	(Brazil) Guilherme Fernandes "Foguetinho"	(Brazil) Spirit Racing	(Japan) Honda	
6	(Paraná (state)) Grande Prêmio de Curitiba	20 de noviembre	(Brazil) João Teixeira	(Brazil) Guilherme Fernandes "Foguetinho"	(Brazil) Guilherme Fernandes "Foguetinho"	(Brazil) Spirit Racing	(Japan) Honda	
7	Grande Prêmio de Minas Gerais	5 de diciembre	(Brazil) João Teixeira	(Brazil) Cauã Buzzo	(Brazil) Cauã Buzzo	(Argentina) Racing Team Tappel	(Japan) Honda	
8	(Goiás) Grande Prêmio de Goiânia	18 de diciembre	(Brazil) João Teixeira	(Brazil) João Teixeira	(Brazil) Murilo Gomes Silva	(Argentina) Koopman Racing	(Japan) Honda	

== Standings ==
Classifications for the Brazilian Superbike Championship

=== Superbike ===
Icon	Class
PRO	PRO
EXT	Extreme

Pos.	Rider	Moto	Class	(São Paulo (state)) SPO	(Goiás) GOI	(São Paulo (state)) PET	(São Paulo (state)) ELF	(São Paulo (state)) INT	(Paraná (state)) CTB	(Minas Gerais) MGS	(Goiás) GNA	Pts
1	(Brazil) Eric Granado	Honda	PRO	1	1	1		1	1	1	1	182
2	(Brazil) Pedro Sampaio	Honda	PRO	2	2	2	1		2	2	2	146
3	(Brazil) Bruno Corano	BMW	PRO	5	12	6	7	9	12	DNS	DNS	82
4	(Brazil) Leonardo Tamburro	Kawasaki	PRO				2	2	4	4	Ret	66
5	(Brazil) Beto Auad	Kawasaki	EXT	10	6	8	9	8	8	7	6	66
6	(Brazil) Osvaldo Jorge "Duende"	Kawasaki	PRO	7		4	4	Ret	6	5	7	65
7	(Brazil) Danilo Lewis	BMW	PRO						3	3	3	48
8	(Brazil) Matheus Barbosa	Kawasaki	PRO	3	3	3						48
9	(Argentina) Marcelo Varbaro	Ducati	PRO	8	4	12	Ret	Ret	Ret	8	10	39
10	(Brazil) Júlio Fortunato	BMW	EXT	4		DNS	3		7			38
11	(Spain) Borja Gómez	Ducati	PRO	6		7		10	Ret	6		35
12	(Brazil) Fábio Pitta	BMW	EXT	9		Ret	11	13	10	11	9	33
13	(Chile) David Loayza	Suzuki	PRO	11				3	5	Ret		32
14	(Brazil) Rodrigo Magalhães	BMW	PRO		Ret	Ret	10	11	9	DNS	4	32
15	(Brazil) Ricardo Ribeiro	MV Agusta	EXT			NC		5	Ret	9	8	26
16	(Brazil) Édson Luiz Mamute	Suzuki	EXT	15	11	9	13	15		12	12	25
17	(Argentina) Carlos Mendoza	BMW	PRO	17			6	4	Ret			23
18	(Brazil) Gustavo Silveira "Gão"	Kawasaki	EXT	13			5	7	DNS			23
19	(Argentina) Rúben García	BMW	PRO	14	7	Ret					5	22
20	(Brazil) André Adriani	Kawasaki	PRO	Ret	5			6	DNQ			21
21	(England) Sam MacLeod	MV Agusta	PRO			5			13	Ret	11	19
22	(Brazil) Douglas Pereira	Kawasaki	EXT	18	8	Ret	Ret	12	Ret	10	DSQ	18
23	(Brazil) Pablo Flores Nunes	Suzuki	EXT	16	13		12	14	14		13	14
24	(Brazil) Sandro Siqueira	Aprilia	EXT		9	11	Ret	Ret	Ret			12
25	(Italy) Ivan Bellarosa	Yamaha	EXT				8	DSQ				8
26	(Brazil) Júnior Moisés	BMW	EXT			10		16				6
27	(Brazil) Nílson Patrone	BMW	PRO		10							6
28	(Brazil) Anselmo Perini	Kawasaki	PRO						11			5
29	(Brazil) Dú Rodrigues	Kawasaki	EXT	12								4
30	(Brazil) Carlos Rossi	Suzuki	EXT								14	2
31	(Brazil) Mauro Thomassini	Kawasaki	EXT	19							Ret	0
32	(Brazil) Luiz Cirinoalan	Kawasaki	EXT	Ret								0
33	(Brazil) Leandro Henrique	Yamaha	EXT				NQ					0
34	(Chile) Benjamin González	Suzuki	PRO		DNS							0
Pos	Rider	Moto	Class	(São Paulo (state)) SPO	(Goiás) GOI	(São Paulo (state)) PET	(São Paulo (state)) ELF	(São Paulo (state)) INT	(Paraná (state)) CTB	(Minas Gerais) MGS	(Goiás) GNA	Pts

Colour	Result
Gold	Winner
Silver	Second place
Bronze	Third place
Green	Points classification
Blue	Non-points classification
Blue	Non-classified finish (NC)
Purple	Retired, not classified (Ret)
Red	Did not qualify (DNQ)
Red	Did not pre-qualify (DNPQ)
Black	Disqualified (DSQ)
White	Did not start (DNS)
White	Withdrew (WD)
White	Race cancelled (C)
Blank	Did not practice (DNP)
Blank	Did not arrive (DNA)
Blank	Excluded (EX)

=== Constructors' standings ===
Pos	Constructor	(São Paulo (state)) SPO	(Goiás) GOI	(São Paulo (state)) PET	(São Paulo (state)) ELF	(São Paulo (state)) INT	(Paraná (state)) CTB	(Minas Gerais) MGS	(Goiás) GNA	Pts
1	(Japan) Honda	1	1	1	1	1	1	1	1	200
2	(Japan) Kawasaki	3	3	3	2	2	4	4	6	124
3	(Germany) BMW	4	7	6	3	4	3	3	3	109
4	(Japan) Suzuki	11	11	9	13	3	5	12	12	55
5	(Italy) Ducati	6	4	12	Ret	10	Ret	6	10	49
6	(Italy) MV Agusta			5		5	13	9	8	40
7	(Italy) Aprilia		9	11	Ret	Ret	Ret			12
8	(Japan) Yamaha				8	DSQ				8
Pos	Constructor	(São Paulo (state)) SPO	(Goiás) GOI	(São Paulo (state)) PET	(São Paulo (state)) ELF	(São Paulo (state)) INT	(Paraná (state)) CTB	(Minas Gerais) MGS	(Goiás) GNA	Pts

=== Superbike Master Senior ===
Icono	Categoría
SEN	Master Senior

Pos.	Rider	Moto	Class	(São Paulo (state)) SPO	(Goiás) GOI	(São Paulo (state)) PET	(São Paulo (state)) ELF	(São Paulo (state)) INT	(Paraná (state)) CTB	(Minas Gerais) MGS	(Goiás) GNA	Pts
1	(Brazil) Alex Barros	BMW	SEN	5	2	3	3	2	2	1	1	153
2	(Argentina) Lautaro Costanzo	BMW	SEN	6	Ret	6	1	7	1	3	7	104
3	(Brazil) Murilo Moretto	BMW	SEN	2	5	7	Ret	1	3	6	5	102
4	(Argentina) Thiago Chiani	Ducati	SEN	1	9	5	2	8	11	4	8	97
5	(Brazil) Vantuir Émerson	Triumph	SEN		4	4	5	12	6	2	13	74
6	(Mexico) Richard Sánchez	Kawasaki	SEN	18	1	1		4			6	73
7	(Brazil) Rodrigo Douff	Kawasaki	SEN	14	6	32	26	6	5	5	4	57
8	(Brazil) André Plentz	Kawasaki	SEN	Ret	3	Ret	12	3	15	12	12	45
9	(United States) Kaveh Rad	Yamaha	SEN	11	Ret	15	4	5	17	9	10	43
10	(Brazil) Leonardo Stephan	Triumph	SEN	3	Ret	2	10	Ret	Ret			42
11	(Brazil) Fernando Bastos	Kawasaki	SEN	Ret	11	9	11	15	9	8	11	38
12	(Brazil) Patrício Nogueira	Kawasaki	SEN	Ret	8	DNS	Ret	Ret	10	15	3	31
13	(Brazil) Rodrigo Colissi	Ducati	SEN	Ret	13	16	6	14	7	10	29	30
14	(Brazil) Luciano Sampaio	Yamaha	SEN							11	2	25
15	(Brazil) Cláudio Martins	Triumph	SEN	28	Ret	8	Ret	11	13	7	Ret	25
16	(Brazil) Fernando Bonorino	BMW	SEN		Ret	20	8	20	8	27	9	23
17	(France) Antoine Hoppenot	MV Agusta	SEN	12	Ret	11	7	13	19	Ret	19	21
18	(Brazil) Sandro Alves	Kawasaki	SEN	9	10	12	18	Ret	Ret	13	22	20
19	(United States) Matthew Sheldon	Kawasaki	SEN	4	16	Ret		10	Ret	Ret	16	19
20	(Brazil) Telismar Lemos Jr	BMW	SEN	Ret	12	10	Ret	9	23	14	20	19
21	(Brazil) Leandro Gonçalves	BMW	SEN	7	20	19	9	Ret	21	21		16
22	(Brazil) Tony Machado	BMW	SEN						4	18	17	13
23	(Brazil) Vilmar Zanella	Ducati	SEN	8	14	14	15	17	26	25	27	13
24	(Republic of Ireland) Niall Logue	Kawasaki	SEN	22	7	21	Ret					9
25	(Brazil) Armando Moniz	Suzuki	SEN	20		13	14	Ret	12			9
26	(Brazil) Cláudio Duarte	BMW	SEN	13	15	18	13	16	16	16	15	8
27	(Brazil) Rogério Valim	Kawasaki	SEN	10	18			22				6
28	(Brazil) Flávio Rauta	Kawasaki	SEN						14	17	18	2
29	(Argentina) Matías Lescano	Ducati	SEN	17	Ret	25	DNS	Ret	28	20	14	2
30	(Brazil) João Amaral	Kawasaki	SEN	15	21	Ret	Ret	29	Ret		33	1
31	(Brazil) Oltencir Saraiva Leitão	BMW	SEN	27	26	22	16	18	22	29	34	0
32	(Brazil) Paulo Nardi	Kawasaki	SEN	DNS			21	21	Ret	DNS	DNQ	0
33	(Brazil) Clair Oliveira	Yamaha	SEN	16	DNS	17	DNS	23				0
34	(Argentina) Franco Constantino	Kawasaki	SEN	19	19	23	20	19	20	22	35	0
35	(Brazil) Régis Kreusburg	Suzuki	SEN		25	26	19	Ret	18	Ret	28	0
36	(Brazil) Raúl Martins	Honda	SEN	25	17	28	23	Ret	30	24	30	0
37	(Brazil) Reginaldo Becker	Honda	SEN	21		Ret	17	DNS	Ret	26	26	0
38	(Brazil) Aline Ribeiro	BMW	SEN				Ret	24	25	19	21	0
39	(Brazil) Jefferson Siqueira	Kawasaki	SEN						29	Ret	31	0
40	(Brazil) Cássio Azevedo	Kawasaki	SEN	Ret	24		Ret					0
41	(Brazil) Wilher Welter	Kawasaki	SEN			29	22	28	Ret	28	37	0
42	(Uruguay) Nicolás López	BMW	SEN							23	24	0
43	(Brazil) Pedro Magalhães	Kawasaki	SEN						24	Ret		0
44	(Brazil) Paolo Folletto	Ducati	SEN	23	22	27	DNS	25	27	DNS		0
45	(Brazil) Milton Caetano	BMW	SEN								25	0
46	(Brazil) Faby Gómez	Ducati	SEN	24	23	24	24	27	31	30	DNQ	0
47	(Brazil) Alessandro Nogueira	Kawasaki	SEN								23	0
48	(Brazil) Letícia Muñoz	Kawasaki	SEN								32	0
49	(Brazil) Márcio Brasil	Kawasaki	SEN				25					0
50	(Brazil) Gilmar Maia	Kawasaki	SEN	26	29	26	30	28				0
51	(Brazil) Jair Moncorvo	Kawasaki	SEN					26	DNQ			0
52	(Argentina) Luciano Nebot	Kawasaki	SEN							31	36	0
53	(Brazil) Celso Giese	Triumph	SEN	Ret								0
54	(Brazil) Rogério Bandeira	Kawasaki	SEN				DNQ		DNS			0
55	(Argentina) Rodrigo Montenegro	Kawasaki	SEN								DNQ	0
56	(Argentina) Franco Schiavoni	Triumph	SEN				DNQ					0
57	(Brazil) Rubem de Castro	Triumph	SEN					DNQ				0
Pos	Piloto	Moto	Clase	(São Paulo (state)) SPO	(Goiás) GOI	(São Paulo (state)) PET	(São Paulo (state)) ELF	(São Paulo (state)) INT	(Paraná (state)) CTB	(Minas Gerais) MGS	(Goiás) GNA	Pts

Colour	Result
Gold	Winner
Silver	Second place
Bronze	Third place
Green	Points classification
Blue	Non-points classification
Blue	Non-classified finish (NC)
Purple	Retired, not classified (Ret)
Red	Did not qualify (DNQ)
Red	Did not pre-qualify (DNPQ)
Black	Disqualified (DSQ)
White	Did not start (DNS)
White	Withdrew (WD)
White	Race cancelled (C)
Blank	Did not practice (DNP)
Blank	Did not arrive (DNA)
Blank	Excluded (EX)

=== Constructors' standings ===
Pos	Constructor	(São Paulo (state)) SPO	(Goiás) GOI	(São Paulo (state)) PET	(São Paulo (state)) ELF	(São Paulo (state)) INT	(Paraná (state)) CTB	(Minas Gerais) MGS	(Goiás) GNA	Pts
1	(Germany) BMW	2	2	3	1	1	1	1	1	181
2	(Japan) Kawasaki	4	1	1	11	3	5	5	3	122
3	(Italy) Ducati	1	9	5	2	8	7	4	8	101
4	(United Kingdom) Triumph	3	Ret	2	10	11	13	2	Ret	70
5	(Japan) Yamaha	16	DNS	17	DNS	23		11	2	25
6	(Italy) MV Agusta	12	Ret	11	7	13	19	Ret	19	21
7	(Japan) Suzuki	20	25	13	14	Ret	12	Ret	28	9
8	(Japan) Honda	21	17	28	17	Ret	30	24	26	0
Pos	Constructor	(São Paulo (state)) SPO	(Goiás) GOI	(São Paulo (state)) PET	(São Paulo (state)) ELF	(São Paulo (state)) INT	(Paraná (state)) CTB	(Minas Gerais) MGS	(Goiás) GNA	Pts

=== Superbike Light ===
Icono	Categoría
LGT	Light
MAS	Master
EVO	EVO
STK	Stock

Pos.	Rider	Moto	Class	(São Paulo (state)) SPO	(Goiás) GOI	(São Paulo (state)) PET	(São Paulo (state)) ELF	(São Paulo (state)) INT	(Paraná (state)) CTB	(Minas Gerais) MGS	(Goiás) GNA	Pts
1	(Brazil) Osvaldo Jorge "Duende"	Kawasaki	STK	4	2	2	2	6	2	1	1	153
2	(Brazil) André Veríssimo	Kawasaki	EVO	1	Ret	1	1	1	1	Ret	3	141
3	(Brazil) Bruno Corano	BMW	EVO	2	8	5	6	2	11	7	8	91
4	(Brazil) Marcelo Skaf	Suzuki	EVO	13	3	4	5	4	Ret	Ret	2	76
5	(Brazil) Raphael Santos	BMW	LGT	3	4	10	7	7	8		5	72
6	(Brazil) Felipe Comerlatto	BMW	EVO	7		3	3	3	5			68
7	(Brazil) Rafael Palmieri "Rizada"	Ducati	LGT	5	7		8	13		3	4	60
8	(Brazil) Luís Ferraz	BMW	STK	11	10	8	10	12	12	4	9	53
9	(Brazil) Alexandre Godói	Kawasaki	MAS	10		7	12	15	6	5	10	47
10	(Brazil) Victor Villaverde	BMW	EVO	20	9	Ret	4	Ret	10	6	Ret	36
11	(Brazil) Rodrigo de Giovani "Cabecinha"	Suzuki	LGT	18	6	6	9	8				35
12	(Brazil) Peterson Pet	BMW	STK	9	11	Ret	11	9	7			33
13	(Brazil) Manow Martins	Kawasaki	LGT	Ret						2	7	29
14	(Brazil) Juracy Rodrigues "Black"	Kawasaki	MAS		1							25
15	(Brazil) Nélson Gonçalves "Mágico"	Suzuki	MAS	14	12	11	16	16	15	8	12	24
16	(Brazil) Wesley Silva Lima	BMW	LGT		Ret	NC		11	9		6	22
17	(Brazil) Juliano Ferrante	Suzuki	EVO	6			Ret	5				21
18	(Brazil) Édson Errera	Honda	MAS	17	14	12	19	18	16	9	11	18
19	(Brazil) Caetano Neto	Kawasaki	EVO						3			16
20	(Brazil) Luiz Bertoli	Kawasaki	LGT	19	5		13	14				16
21	(Brazil) Rubem Mardegan	BMW	LGT	8		9						15
22	(Brazil) Anselmo Perini	Kawasaki	EVO						4			13
23	(Brazil) Lucas Dezeró	BMW	STK					10				6
24	(Brazil) Fábio Queiroz	Ducati	LGT	12			14					6
25	(Brazil) Danilo Costa	Kawasaki	LGT	16	13							3
26	(Brazil) Agnaldo Schmitz	BMW	LGT						13			3
27	(Brazil) Cléberson Maicher "Alemão"	Kawasaki	EVO						14			2
28	(Brazil) Marco Pérez "Marcão"	BMW	MAS	15			17	17				1
29	(Brazil) Magno "Menino de Ouro"	Kawasaki	STK				15					1
30	(Brazil) Bruno Carneiro	Kawasaki	LGT				18					0
31	(Brazil) Rodrigo Dazzi	BMW	EVO					Ret				0
32	(Brazil) Fabrício Marciano de Freitas	MV Agusta	EVO								DNS	0
33	(Brazil) Marcelo Marques	Kawasaki	MAS	DSQ								0
34	(Brazil) Breno Pinto	Yamaha	LGT		NC							0
35	(Brazil) Gustavo Silveira "Gão"	Kawasaki	LGT	Ret								0
36	(Brazil) Cassiano Machado	Suzuki	LGT	DNS								0
Pos	Piloto	Moto	Clase	(São Paulo (state)) SPO	(Goiás) GOI	(São Paulo (state)) PET	(São Paulo (state)) ELF	(São Paulo (state)) INT	(Paraná (state)) CTB	(Minas Gerais) MGS	(Goiás) GNA	Pts

Colour	Result
Gold	Winner
Silver	Second place
Bronze	Third place
Green	Points classification
Blue	Non-points classification
Blue	Non-classified finish (NC)
Purple	Retired, not classified (Ret)
Red	Did not qualify (DNQ)
Red	Did not pre-qualify (DNPQ)
Black	Disqualified (DSQ)
White	Did not start (DNS)
White	Withdrew (WD)
White	Race cancelled (C)
Blank	Did not practice (DNP)
Blank	Did not arrive (DNA)
Blank	Excluded (EX)

=== Constructors' standings ===
Pos	Constructor	(São Paulo (state)) SPO	(Goiás) GOI	(São Paulo (state)) PET	(São Paulo (state)) ELF	(São Paulo (state)) INT	(Paraná (state)) CTB	(Minas Gerais) MGS	(Goiás) GNA	Pts
1	(Japan) Kawasaki	1	1	1	1	1	1	1	1	200
2	(Germany) BMW	2	8	3	3	2	5	6	8	109
3	(Japan) Suzuki	6	3	4	5	4	15	8	2	92
4	(Italy) Ducati	5	7		8	13		3	4	60
5	(Japan) Honda	17	14	12	19	18	16	9	11	18
6	(Italy) MV Agusta								DNS	0
7	(Japan) Yamaha		NC							0
Pos	Constructor	(São Paulo (state)) SPO	(Goiás) GOI	(São Paulo (state)) PET	(São Paulo (state)) ELF	(São Paulo (state)) INT	(Paraná (state)) CTB	(Minas Gerais) MGS	(Goiás) GNA	Pts

=== Supersport 600 ===
Icono	Categoría
PRO	PRO
STK	Stock
MAS	Master
EXT	Extreme

Pos.	Rider	Moto	Class	(São Paulo (state)) SPO	(Goiás) GOI	(São Paulo (state)) PET	(São Paulo (state)) ELF	(São Paulo (state)) INT	(Paraná (state)) CTB	(Minas Gerais) MGS	(Goiás) GNA	Pts
1	(Brazil) Leonardo Tamburro	Kawasaki	PRO	1	1	1	1	1	1	1	1	200
2	(Brazil) Rubens Mesquita	Kawasaki	STK	5		3	2	2			2	87
3	(Brazil) Paulo Foroni	Triumph	MAS	8	5	9	8	8	4	3	5	82
4	(Brazil) Marcos Fortunato	Kawasaki	EXT	7	4	8	9	7	3	Ret		62
5	(Brazil) Diego Viveiros	Kawasaki	PRO						2	2	3	56
6	(Brazil) Douglas Mangini Russo	Kawasaki	EXT	10	6	10	10	10	Ret	6	6	54
7	(Brazil) Marcos Kawasaki	Triumph	MAS	11	7	11	11	11	5	7		49
8	(Brazil) Victor C. Luciano "Durval Careca"	Kawasaki	PRO	4		5		6	Ret	4		47
9	(Brazil) Júlio César Parra	Kawasaki	EXT	6		6	4	4				46
10	(Brazil) Magno "Menino Ouro"	Kawasaki	STK		2		5	9				38
11	(Brazil) Daniel Gurgel Mendonça	Kawasaki	PRO	3		Ret	3	NC				32
12	(Brazil) Hebert S. Pereira	Kawasaki	PRO	2				5				31
13	(Brazil) Ives Moraes	Triumph	PRO			4		3				29
14	(Brazil) Régis Santos	Kawasaki	EXT		3					5	DNS	27
15	(Brazil) Luiz Cerciari	Kawasaki	PRO			2	Ret	12		DNS	DSQ	24
16	(Brazil) Lucas Dezeró	Kawasaki	PRO	Ret		7	6	Ret				19
17	(Brazil) Rogério Gentil Fernandes	Kawasaki	MAS	9			7					16
18	(Argentina) Franco Pandolfino	Kawasaki	EXT								4	13
19	(Brazil) Luiz Imparato	Kawasaki	MAS								7	9
20	(Brazil) Franco Monteiro	Triumph	MAS	Ret								0
21	(Brazil) Vítor Reis "Vitinho"	Yamaha	STK								Ret	0
22	(Brazil) Raphael Brito Fletado	Yamaha	EXT	DNS								0
23	(Brazil) Genildo Batista	Yamaha	EXT		DNS							0
24	(Brazil) Júnior Moreira	Kawasaki	EXT	WD								0
Pos	Piloto	Moto	Clase	(São Paulo (state)) SPO	(Goiás) GOI	(São Paulo (state)) PET	(São Paulo (state)) ELF	(São Paulo (state)) INT	(Paraná (state)) CTB	(Minas Gerais) MGS	(Goiás) GNA	Pts

Colour	Result
Gold	Winner
Silver	Second place
Bronze	Third place
Green	Points classification
Blue	Non-points classification
Blue	Non-classified finish (NC)
Purple	Retired, not classified (Ret)
Red	Did not qualify (DNQ)
Red	Did not pre-qualify (DNPQ)
Black	Disqualified (DSQ)
White	Did not start (DNS)
White	Withdrew (WD)
White	Race cancelled (C)
Blank	Did not practice (DNP)
Blank	Did not arrive (DNA)
Blank	Excluded (EX)

=== Constructors' standings ===
Pos	Constructor	(São Paulo (state)) SPO	(Goiás) GOI	(São Paulo (state)) PET	(São Paulo (state)) ELF	(São Paulo (state)) INT	(Paraná (state)) CTB	(Minas Gerais) MGS	(Goiás) GNA	Pts
1	(Japan) Kawasaki	1	1	1	1	1	1	1	1	200
2	(United Kingdom) Triumph	8	5	4	8	3	4	3	5	96
3	(Japan) Yamaha	DNS	DNS						Ret	0
Pos	Constructor	(São Paulo (state)) SPO	(Goiás) GOI	(São Paulo (state)) PET	(São Paulo (state)) ELF	(São Paulo (state)) INT	(Paraná (state)) CTB	(Minas Gerais) MGS	(Goiás) GNA	Pts

=== Supersport 400 ===
Icono	Categoría
NJA	Ninja 400 Cup
R3	R3 Cup
KTM	KTM Cup
400	Ninja 400
NMT	Ninja 400 Master
MAS	R3 Master
CBR	CBR 500R
500M	CBR 500 Master
300M	Ninja 300 Master
300	Ninja 300

Pos.	Rider	Moto	Class	(São Paulo (state)) SPO	(Goiás) GOI	(São Paulo (state)) PET	(São Paulo (state)) ELF	(São Paulo (state)) INT	(Paraná (state)) CTB	(Minas Gerais) MGS	(Goiás) GNA	Pts
1	(Brazil) Felipe Gonçalves	Kawasaki	NJA	3	2	1	1	1	1	3	2	172
2	(Brazil) Lincoln Lima Melo	Kawasaki	400	1	4	3	3	11	2	1	9	127
3	(Brazil) Arthur Costa	KTM	KTM	9	7	2	2	Ret	3	4	4	98
4	(Brazil) Niko Ramos	Kawasaki	NJA	2	5	4	6	6	4	6	7	96
5	(Brazil) Gabrielly Lewis	Yamaha	R3	10	8	8	9	9	12	13	16	64
6	(Brazil) João Pedro Arratia	Yamaha	R3	8	6		5	2		9	10	62
7	(Brazil) Rafael S. Oliveira	Kawasaki	400	12	3	5	8	4	Ret	16	Ret	52
8	(Uruguay) Facundo Llambías	Kawasaki	400							2	1	45
9	(Brazil) Mariano Villalobos	Kawasaki	NJA					5	6	5	5	43
10	(Brazil) Gustavo Manso	Yamaha	R3	7	9		7	8		8		41
11	(Brazil) Willians Piuí	Kawasaki	NMT	4		6		3				39
12	(Brazil) Raquel Vaz	Kawasaki	400		1	DSQ					6	35
13	(Brazil) Gustavo Silveira "Gão"	Kawasaki	NJA				12	7	5	10	8	34
14	(Brazil) Pedro Foroni	Kawasaki	NJA		Ret	Ret	21	12	7	7	12	26
15	(Brazil) Fabrício Zamperetti	Yamaha	MAS	16	13	9	11	27	11	12	Ret	24
16	(Brazil) Christian Cerciari	Kawasaki	400	6		DSQ	4	19	Ret	Ret	Ret	23
17	(Brazil) Fabinho da Hornet	Honda	CBR			15	14	15	9	14	14	19
18	(Brazil) Eduardo S. Oliveira	Honda	CBR	14	10	7						17
19	(Brazil) Kioman Muñoz	Kawasaki	300								3	16
20	(Brazil) Ana Lima	Yamaha	MAS	17	Ret	10	15	13	10	Ret		16
21	(Brazil) André Schettini	Yamaha	R3			13	13	Ret		11	15	12
22	(Brazil) Renê Augusto Baggio	Kawasaki	NMT	5								11
23	(Brazil) Diogo Soares	Yamaha	R3			12	17	10				10
24	(Brazil) Filipe Campos	Kawasaki	NJA				19	14	14		11	9
25	(Brazil) Adalberto Pereira	Kawasaki	NJA				10	Ret		Ret	13	9
26	(Brazil) Eduardo Souza	Kawasaki	400						8			8
27	(Brazil) Marcelo Simões "Bode"	Yamaha	R3	15		11						6
28	(Brazil) Erik Vivolo	Yamaha	R3	18	Ret	14	16	18	13	15	18	6
29	(Brazil) Kevin Fontainha	Yamaha	R3	11				25				5
30	(Brazil) Anderson F. Silva	Kawasaki	NMT	Ret	11	Ret		Ret				5
31	(Brazil) Jorge Ramos	Kawasaki	400		12							4
32	(Brazil) João Fascinelli	Yamaha	R3	13								3
33	(Brazil) Jarbas Almeida	Honda	CBR						15			1
34	(Brazil) José Assis	Kawasaki	NMT				20	16				0
35	(Brazil) Michael A. Marques	Kawasaki	NMT			16						0
36	(Brazil) Edinho Pikoloko	Yamaha	MAS	19			18	17				0
37	(Brazil) Tirsten Soares Mourão	Yamaha	R3	21							17	0
38	(Brazil) Danilo Felippo	Honda	CBR							17		0
39	(Brazil) Lucas R. da Silva	Honda	500M			17						0
40	(Brazil) Gabriel Gusmão Farias	Yamaha	R3			18						0
41	(Brazil) Fábio Terras	KTM	KTM				Ret	28			19	0
42	(Brazil) Alberdan F. Rocha	Kawasaki	NMT	Ret		Ret	Ret	26			20	0
43	(Brazil) Alex Fernandes	Kawasaki	NMT					20				0
44	(Brazil) Pedro Henrique	Yamaha	R3	20								0
45	(Brazil) Ricardo de Camargo	Yamaha	MAS				22	21				0
46	(Brazil) Anderson Felipe	Honda	500M	Ret				22				0
47	(Brazil) Cintia Pardini	Yamaha	MAS	22								0
48	(Brazil) Luís Fernando Ximenes	Kawasaki	300M				23					0
49	(Brazil) Edgar Grampola	Honda	500M					23				0
50	(Brazil) Rodrigo Simon	Kawasaki	NMT					24				0
51	(Brazil) Humberto Maier "Turquinho Jr"	Yamaha	R3					29				0
52	(Brazil) Thiago Montanari	Kawasaki	400								DSQ	0
53	(Brazil) Thiago Medeiros	Kawasaki	300							Ret		0
54	(Brazil) Jorge Simonit	Kawasaki	300M								Ret	0
Pos	Piloto	Moto	Clase	(São Paulo (state)) SPO	(Goiás) GOI	(São Paulo (state)) PET	(São Paulo (state)) ELF	(São Paulo (state)) INT	(Paraná (state)) CTB	(Minas Gerais) MGS	(Goiás) GNA	Pts

Colour	Result
Gold	Winner
Silver	Second place
Bronze	Third place
Green	Points classification
Blue	Non-points classification
Blue	Non-classified finish (NC)
Purple	Retired, not classified (Ret)
Red	Did not qualify (DNQ)
Red	Did not pre-qualify (DNPQ)
Black	Disqualified (DSQ)
White	Did not start (DNS)
White	Withdrew (WD)
White	Race cancelled (C)
Blank	Did not practice (DNP)
Blank	Did not arrive (DNA)
Blank	Excluded (EX)

=== Constructors' standings ===
Pos	Constructor	(São Paulo (state)) SPO	(Goiás) GOI	(São Paulo (state)) PET	(São Paulo (state)) ELF	(São Paulo (state)) INT	(Paraná (state)) CTB	(Minas Gerais) MGS	(Goiás) GNA	Pts
1	(Japan) Kawasaki	1	1	1	1	1	1	1	1	200
2	(Austria) KTM	9	7	2	2	28	3	4	4	98
3	(Japan) Yamaha	7	6	8	5	2	10	8	10	78
4	(Japan) Honda	14	10	7	14	15	9	14	14	31
Pos	Constructor	(São Paulo (state)) SPO	(Goiás) GOI	(São Paulo (state)) PET	(São Paulo (state)) ELF	(São Paulo (state)) INT	(Paraná (state)) CTB	(Minas Gerais) MGS	(Goiás) GNA	Pts

=== Copa Honda CBR 650R ===
Icono	Categoría
PRO	PRO
MAS	Master
LGT	Light

Pos.	Rider	Moto	Class	(São Paulo (state)) SPO	(Goiás) GOI	(São Paulo (state)) PET	(São Paulo (state)) ELF	(São Paulo (state)) INT	(Paraná (state)) CTB	(Minas Gerais) MGS	(Goiás) GNA	Pts
1	(Brazil) Guilherme Brito	Honda	PRO	1	1	1	1	2	2	5	7	170
2	(Brazil) Rafael Rigueiro	Honda	PRO	2	2	2	2	1	DNS		1	132
3	(Brazil) Théo Manna	Honda	PRO	4	3	4	5	3	1	6	14	122
4	(Brazil) Juracy Rodrigues Black	Honda	MAS	3	4	5	4	6	4	3		92
5	(Brazil) João Vítor Carneiro	Honda	PRO			3	3	Ret	3	2	2	88
6	(Brazil) Richard Oliveira	Honda	LGT	10	6	15	10	9	6	4	4	66
7	(Brazil) Lucas Minato	Honda	PRO	6	7	7	7	Ret	7	7	6	65
8	(Brazil) Lucas Torres	Honda	PRO	Ret				4	5	1	DNF	49
9	(Brazil) Alexandre Oliveira Colorado	Honda	MAS	11	9	11	12	11	10		5	43
10	(Brazil) Rodrigo Medeiros	Honda	MAS	8	11	13	17	13	11	8	9	39
11	(Brazil) Diego Viveiros	Honda	PRO	5	5	18	9	8				37
12	(Brazil) Mário Nicoli	Honda	PRO			8	8	7	8			33
13	(Brazil) Maurício Marques	Honda	PRO	16	Ret	6	6	5	NC			31
14	(Brazil) José Eduardo Lara	Honda	PRO	7	8	10	Ret					23
15	(Brazil) Marcelo Simões "Bode"	Honda	PRO				16	10	9		8	21
16	(Brazil) Daniel Mos	Honda	MAS	9		9	13					17
17	(Brazil) Gustavo Alves	Honda	PRO								3	16
18	(Brazil) Mauro Sapico	Honda	PRO			14	14	15	12	10		15
19	(Brazil) Felipe Ortiz	Honda	LGT	Ret	18	25	27	Ret	14	9	11	14
20	(Brazil) Isaque Teixeira	Honda	MAS	12	10	17	15	14				13
21	(Brazil) Maurício Laranjeira	Honda	MAS	17	13	16	19	16	13		10	12
22	(Brazil) Eduardo Domingues	Honda	PRO				11	12				9
23	(Brazil) Henrique Poli Jr	Honda	MAS	Ret	12	12				Ret		8
24	(Brazil) Anderson Felipe	Honda	MAS	15	16	21	21	23	15	13	13	8
25	(Brazil) Rodrigo Simon	Honda	LGT	14				19		11		7
26	(Brazil) Michael Valtingojer	Honda	MAS	21	15	20	23	17	16	14	12	7
27	(Brazil) Ronaldo Guimarães	Honda	LGT	13	14		18	DNS				5
28	(Brazil) Sylvio Barone	Honda	MAS							12		4
29	(Brazil) Marcos Kawasaki	Honda	LGT	18	17	22	25	20	18	15	16	1
30	(Brazil) Tabajara Ayres Filho	Honda	LGT	20	19	23	28	Ret	20	16	15	1
31	(Brazil) Marcelo Laranjeira Colorado	Honda	LGT	19		19	20	Ret	Wth		Ret	0
32	(Brazil) Luís Alberto Ferreira "Betinho"	Honda	LGT	DNS		24	26	24	19	17		0
33	(Brazil) Nélson Gonçalves "Mágico"	Honda	MAS			DNS	24	21	17	DNQ	Ret	0
34	(Brazil) Gilberto Gnecchi Jr	Honda	MAS	NC		Ret	22	18				0
35	(Brazil) Carlos Egydio	Honda	MAS						21			0
36	(Brazil) Michael Alexandre	Honda	LGT					22				0
37	(Brazil) Nélson R. de Oliveira	Honda	MAS	Ret	Ret							0
38	(Brazil) Alexandre Tanga	Honda	LGT						Ret			0
39	(Brazil) Leandro Espósito	Honda	PRO	DNS								0
Pos	Piloto	Moto	Clase	(São Paulo (state)) SPO	(Goiás) GOI	(São Paulo (state)) PET	(São Paulo (state)) ELF	(São Paulo (state)) INT	(Paraná (state)) CTB	(Minas Gerais) MGS	(Goiás) GNA	Pts

Colour	Result
Gold	Winner
Silver	Second place
Bronze	Third place
Green	Points classification
Blue	Non-points classification
Blue	Non-classified finish (NC)
Purple	Retired, not classified (Ret)
Red	Did not qualify (DNQ)
Red	Did not pre-qualify (DNPQ)
Black	Disqualified (DSQ)
White	Did not start (DNS)
White	Withdrew (WD)
White	Race cancelled (C)
Blank	Did not practice (DNP)
Blank	Did not arrive (DNA)
Blank	Excluded (EX)

=== Copa Honda CBR 650R EVO ===
Icono	Categoría
EVO	EVO

Pos.	Rider	Moto	Class	(São Paulo (state)) SPO	(Goiás) GOI	(São Paulo (state)) PET	(São Paulo (state)) ELF	(São Paulo (state)) INT	(Paraná (state)) CTB	(Minas Gerais) MGS	(Goiás) GNA	Pts
1	(Italy) Leonardo Capezzi	Honda	EVO	3	1	1	6	3	2	3	1	153
2	(Brazil) Daniel Rechenmacher	Honda	EVO	1	11	9	1	7	Ret	4	4	97
3	(Brazil) Luís Diego Soares	Honda	EVO	4	2	2		4	4	7	8	96
4	(Mexico) Miguel Carreón	Honda	EVO	5	8	4	DNS	6	1	1	Ret	92
5	(Brazil) Reni Wegmann	Honda	EVO	7	6	5	4	2	Ret	10	2	89
6	(Brazil) Adelmo Souza	Honda	EVO	9	9	DNS	DNS	1	3	6	6	75
7	(Brazil) Marcelo Garcia	Honda	EVO	2	3	12	10	10	4	13	9	71
8	(Brazil) Luiz Beck	Honda	EVO	10	10	3	3	13	9	14	5	67
9	(Brazil) Luiz Fernando Padilha	Honda	EVO	11	5	6	5	9	Ret	5	DSQ	55
10	(Brazil) Carlos Sopran	Honda	EVO	13	4	10	7	8	8	20	10	53
11	(Colombia) Yeferson Paz	Honda	EVO	8	7	18	9	14	6	12	7	49
12	(Brazil) Élton Oppermann	Honda	EVO	6	12	7	2	Ret	12	Ret	Ret	47
13	(Brazil) Jonathan Gomes	Honda	EVO	Ret	13	8	DNS	5	Ret	8	3	46
14	(Albania) Flávio Sulejmani	Honda	EVO	12	15	Ret	11	11	7	9	10	37
15	(Brazil) Róbson Hull	Honda	EVO			11			11	2	Ret	30
16	(Brazil) Juares Martins	Honda	EVO	14	14	13	13	Ret	Ret	11	Ret	15
17	(Venezuela) Bruno Schmutz	Honda	EVO	17	21	15	8	Ret	DNS	Ret	12	13
18	(Brazil) Roberto Almeida	Honda	EVO	Ret	18	Ret		Ret	10	Ret	15	7
19	(Brazil) Marcelino Moreira	Honda	EVO	20	16	19	16	12	14	25	Ret	6
20	(Mexico) Emanuel Montejano	Honda	EVO	15	17	14	17	Ret	DNS	16	13	6
21	(Canada) Callum Irving	Honda	EVO				12					4
22	(Brazil) Arthur Heinz	Honda	EVO	Ret	22	20	19	21	13	15	18	4
23	(Brazil) Charles Brum	Honda	EVO	16	25	DNS	15	17	15	23	16	2
24	(Brazil) Sílvio Leivas	Honda	EVO	18	19	17	14	18	Ret	21	17	2
25	(Brazil) Marcos Maier	Honda	EVO	22	23	16	Ret	16		22	14	2
26	(Brazil) Tanger Jardim	Honda	EVO	Ret	20			15	Ret			1
27	(Brazil) Francisco Navarro Garrão	Honda	EVO	26	28	21	18	20	Ret	18	Ret	0
28	(Brazil) Alfredo Alonso	Honda	EVO	28	Ret	23	Ret	Ret	DNS	19	19	0
29	(Argentina) Dylan Barrios	Honda	EVO	21	27	DNS		19	16	17		0
30	(Brazil) Simone Sabin	Honda	EVO	19	24			DNS	DNS	Ret		0
31	(Colombia) Santiago Rincón	Honda	EVO	25	26	22		22	Ret	24		0
32	(Argentina) Leandro de Santi	Honda	EVO				20					0
33	(Argentina) Lionel Castellón	Honda	EVO	23	Ret			Ret				0
34	(Brazil) Eron Garcia	Honda	EVO	24								0
35	(Brazil) Paulo Silva	Honda	EVO			WD				26		0
36	(Brazil) Geci Mallmann	Honda	EVO	27	Ret			DNS				0
37	(Brazil) Hélder Jacoby	Honda	EVO		29			DNS				0
38	(Brazil) Adriano Winkel	Honda	EVO				Ret					0
39	(Brazil) Paulo Gemelli	Honda	EVO				Ret					0
40	(Spain) Miguel Acosta	Honda	EVO			Ret			Ret	Ret		0
41	(Brazil) Marcel Ferreira	Honda	EVO			DNP						0
Pos	Piloto	Moto	Clase	(São Paulo (state)) SPO	(Goiás) GOI	(São Paulo (state)) PET	(São Paulo (state)) ELF	(São Paulo (state)) INT	(Paraná (state)) CTB	(Minas Gerais) MGS	(Goiás) GNA	Pts

Colour	Result
Gold	Winner
Silver	Second place
Bronze	Third place
Green	Points classification
Blue	Non-points classification
Blue	Non-classified finish (NC)
Purple	Retired, not classified (Ret)
Red	Did not qualify (DNQ)
Red	Did not pre-qualify (DNPQ)
Black	Disqualified (DSQ)
White	Did not start (DNS)
White	Withdrew (WD)
White	Race cancelled (C)
Blank	Did not practice (DNP)
Blank	Did not arrive (DNA)
Blank	Excluded (EX)

=== Superbike Escola ===
Icono	Categoría
SBEC	Superbike Escola
SBET	Superbike Estreante
SPEC	Supersport Escola
SPET	Supersport Estreante

Pos.	Rider	Moto	Class	(São Paulo (state)) SPO	(Goiás) GOI	(São Paulo (state)) PET	(São Paulo (state)) ELF	(São Paulo (state)) INT	(Paraná (state)) CTB	(Minas Gerais) MGS	(Goiás) GNA	Pts
1	(Brazil) Leandro Pardini	BMW	SBEC	4	DSQ	1	1	1	3	3	1	145
2	(Brazil) Marcelo Augusto dos Santos Oliveira	Kawasaki	SBEC	7	DSQ	2	2	2	10	2	5	106
3	(Argentina) Franco Pandolfino	Yamaha	SPEC	11	1	6	7	3	13	7		77
4	(Brazil) Luís Armando Boechat Alves	BMW	SBEC	13		4	4	5	8		2	68
5	(Brazil) Sérgio Aparecido da Silva "Serginho"	Yamaha	SBEC	5		3	3	11	19	10	6	64
6	(Brazil) Luís Roberto N. Zuliani	Ducati	SBET	14	4	9	11	8	16	9	3	58
7	(Brazil) Felipe Salgado Bittencourt "Doc"	Suzuki	SBET	9	5	11	Ret	12	9	5	4	58
8	(Brazil) Éverton Costa	Honda	SBEC	8	2	8	5	13				50
9	(Brazil) Christian Simonit "Gringo"	BMW	SBEC	12	3	12	8	14	18	8	8	50
10	(Brazil) Pedro Kamikaze	Kawasaki	SPET			10	6	6	7	6		45
11	(Brazil) Sandro Oliveira	BMW	SBET			5		9	5			29
12	(Brazil) Wesley Lima Silva	BMW	SBEC	1	Ret							25
13	(Brazil) Danilo Brum	Kawasaki	SBEC						1			25
14	(Brazil) Demétrius Machado	BMW	SBET							1		25
15	(Brazil) Sidnei Machado	Kawasaki	SBET	2								20
16	(Brazil) Diogo Kaktin	BMW	SBEC						2			20
17	(Brazil) Dênis Manfredini	BMW	SBEC			13	10	10	11			20
18	(Brazil) Adriano Walendy de Lima	Kawasaki	SPEC	15		Ret		7	14			19
19	(Brazil) Gérson Caleb	Kawasaki	SPEC	10		18		4		Ret		19
20	(Brazil) Júnior Moisés	BMW	SBEC	3								16
21	(Brazil) Renan Pezani	BMW	SBET			7				11		14
22	(Brazil) Everton Nicks	Kawasaki	SPEC						4			13
23	(Brazil) André Batista	Ducati	SBEC							4		13
24	(Brazil) Bruno E. Carneiro	Kawasaki	SBEC	Ret	6	Ret						10
25	(Brazil) Erich Guerrero "Guerra"	Ducati	SBEC	6								10
26	(Brazil) Márcio Pacheco	BMW	SPEC						6			10
27	(Brazil) Paulo Joe King	Kawasaki	SPET				15	21	23	12	11	10
28	(Brazil) Pedro Costa	BMW	SBET								7	9
29	(Argentina) Sebastián Bongiovanni	Kawasaki	SBEC								9	7
30	(Brazil) Cléber Miranda	Kawasaki	SBEC								10	6
31	(Brazil) Édson Fucinho	Kawasaki	SBET				12		22			4
32	(Brazil) Vanderlei Pinho	Yamaha	SBEC						12			4
33	(Brazil) Walter Becker Jr	Triumph	SPEC	Ret		15	13	19				4
34	(Brazil) Fabrício Vásques Gonçalves	Yamaha	SPET	19		14	9	15		NC		3
35	(Brazil) Lung Ji "Rocky"	BMW	SBET					22		13		3
36	(Brazil) Adelino Navarro Verderio	Kawasaki	SBEC	20		22	19	Ret		14		2
37	(Brazil) Wilson Picoloto	Kawasaki	SBET				14					2
38	(Brazil) Christian Quick	Honda	SBET						15			1
39	(Brazil) Rafael de Nóbrega	Triumph	SPET	16								0
40	(Brazil) Eduardo Guerreiro	Kawasaki	SBET			16						0
41	(Brazil) Rogério de Oliveira	Honda	SPET				16					0
42	(Brazil) Moabe "Coco Loco"	BMW	SBET					16				0
43	(Brazil) Luiz Imparato	Kawasaki	SPEC			17	DNS	18				0
44	(Brazil) Paulo de Tarso do Amaral	Kawasaki	SPET	17		19						0
45	(Brazil) Luciano Bueno	BMW	SBET				17	Ret				0
46	(Brazil) Demian Sarcinelli	Honda	SPET					17				0
47	(Brazil) Alex Barbosa	BMW	SBEC						17			0
48	(Brazil) Marco Aurélio Theodoro	BMW	SBET	WD		21	18	20				0
49	(Brazil) Daniel Ceni	Triumph	SPEC	18					Ret			0
50	(Brazil) Ruberley Luciano	BMW	SBET			20						0
51	(Brazil) Émerson Filho	Suzuki	SPEC						20			0
52	(Brazil) Rafael Milazzo	Kawasaki	SPET						21			0
53	(Brazil) Renê Barreto Neto	Kawasaki	SPEC	21		23						0
54	(Brazil) Ana Paula de Faria	Yamaha	SBET	22								0
55	(Brazil) Vinícius Zancheta	Kawasaki	SBET				Ret					0
56	(Brazil) Felipe Baltazar	BMW	SBEC	NQ								0
57	(Brazil) Robson Rui	BMW	SBET					Ret				0
58	(Brazil) Luís Fernando Ximenes	Ducati	SBET	DNS								0
59	(Argentina) Diego di Benedetto	Kawasaki	SBEC								Ret	0
60	(Brazil) Caio Morisco	BMW	SBEC							DNS		0
61	(Brazil) Ronaldo Ranieri	BMW	SPEC							DNS		0
Pos	Piloto	Moto	Clase	(São Paulo (state)) SPO	(Goiás) GOI	(São Paulo (state)) PET	(São Paulo (state)) ELF	(São Paulo (state)) INT	(Paraná (state)) CTB	(Minas Gerais) MGS	(Goiás) GNA	Pts

Colour	Result
Gold	Winner
Silver	Second place
Bronze	Third place
Green	Points classification
Blue	Non-points classification
Blue	Non-classified finish (NC)
Purple	Retired, not classified (Ret)
Red	Did not qualify (DNQ)
Red	Did not pre-qualify (DNPQ)
Black	Disqualified (DSQ)
White	Did not start (DNS)
White	Withdrew (WD)
White	Race cancelled (C)
Blank	Did not practice (DNP)
Blank	Did not arrive (DNA)
Blank	Excluded (EX)

=== Constructors' standings ===
Pos	Constructor	(São Paulo (state)) SPO	(Goiás) GOI	(São Paulo (state)) PET	(São Paulo (state)) ELF	(São Paulo (state)) INT	(Paraná (state)) CTB	(Minas Gerais) MGS	(Goiás) GNA	Pts
1	(Germany) BMW	1	3	1	1	1	2	1	1	186
2	(Japan) Kawasaki	2	6	2	2	2	1	2	5	146
3	(Japan) Yamaha	5	1	3	3	3	12	7	6	107
4	(Italy) Ducati	6	4	9	11	8	16	9	3	66
5	(Japan) Suzuki	9	5	11	Ret	12	9	5	4	58
6	(Japan) Honda	8	2	8	5	13	15			51
7	(United Kingdom) Triumph	16		15	13	19	Ret			4
Pos	Constructor	(São Paulo (state)) SPO	(Goiás) GOI	(São Paulo (state)) PET	(São Paulo (state)) ELF	(São Paulo (state)) INT	(Paraná (state)) CTB	(Minas Gerais) MGS	(Goiás) GNA	Pts

=== Honda Junior Cup ===
Icono	Categoría
CUP	Honda Junior Cup
FEM	Cup Feminino

Pos.	Rider	Moto	Class	(São Paulo (state)) SPO	(Goiás) GOI	(São Paulo (state)) PET	(São Paulo (state)) ELF	(São Paulo (state)) INT	(Paraná (state)) CTB	(Minas Gerais) MGS	(Goiás) GNA	Pts
1	(Brazil) Guilherme Fernandes "Foguetinho"	Honda	CUP	2	2	3	1	1	1	2	5	164
2	(Brazil) João Teixeira	Honda	CUP	1	1	1	2	2	2	3	Ret	159
3	(Brazil) Cauã Buzzo	Honda	CUP	6	3	4	3	3	3	1	DSQ	112
4	(Brazil) Giovanna Brasil	Honda	FEM	Ret	Ret	6	4	4	4	5	4	76
5	(Brazil) Vítor de Castro Ribeiro	Honda	CUP	5	4	11	7	8	10	9	6	70
6	(Brazil) Murilo Gomes Silva	Honda	CUP			DNS		7	5	6	1	55
7	(Brazil) Raul Mattos Cerciari	Honda	CUP			5	6	6	6	4		54
8	(Brazil) Enzo Ximenes "Lulinha"	Honda	CUP				8	5	7	7	7	47
9	(Brazil) Heitor Luz Santos "Ourinho"	Honda	CUP			13	9	Ret	9	8	2	45
10	(Brazil) Letícia Vivolo	Honda	FEM	7	5	14	10	9	Ret	10	8	41
11	(Brazil) Gustavo Santos "Caixinha"	Honda	CUP	3		12	5					31
12	(Brazil) Enzo Verdeli	Honda	CUP	4		8						21
13	(Brazil) Matheus Oliveira	Honda	CUP			2						20
14	(Argentina) Mateo Bongiovanni Escobar	Honda	CUP								3	16
15	(Brazil) Alice F. Matos	Honda	FEM						8		9	16
16	(Brazil) Ian Garcia "Caxote"	Honda	CUP			7	Ret					9
17	(Brazil) Deivis Elizeu Costa Silva	Honda	CUP			9						7
18	(Brazil) Deric Elias Costa Silva	Honda	CUP			10						6
19	(Bolivia) Nicolás Torrez	Honda	CUP		Ret							0
20	(Argentina) Fernando Romagnolli	Honda	CUP							DNQ		0
Pos	Piloto	Moto	Clase	(São Paulo (state)) SPO	(Goiás) GOI	(São Paulo (state)) PET	(São Paulo (state)) ELF	(São Paulo (state)) INT	(Paraná (state)) CTB	(Minas Gerais) MGS	(Goiás) GNA	Pts

Colour	Result
Gold	Winner
Silver	Second place
Bronze	Third place
Green	Points classification
Blue	Non-points classification
Blue	Non-classified finish (NC)
Purple	Retired, not classified (Ret)
Red	Did not qualify (DNQ)
Red	Did not pre-qualify (DNPQ)
Black	Disqualified (DSQ)
White	Did not start (DNS)
White	Withdrew (WD)
White	Race cancelled (C)
Blank	Did not practice (DNP)
Blank	Did not arrive (DNA)
Blank	Excluded (EX)

=== Scoring system ===
Points are awarded to the top fifteen finishers of the main race and to the top nine of the sprint. A rider has to finish the race to earn points.

Position	1°	2°	3°	4°	5°	6°	7°	8°	9°	10°	11°	12°	13°	14°	15°
Race	25	20	16	13	11	10	9	8	7	6	5	4	3	2	1

== Champions of all categories ==
=== Overview ===
#	Class	Champion	Team	Construtor	Moto	Ref
PRO	Superbike PRO	(Brazil) Eric Granado	(Brazil) Honda Racing	(Japan) Honda	Honda CBR 1000RR	
EXT	Superbike Extreme	(Brazil) Beto Auad	(Brazil) TPR Klim Edelmann Racing	(Japan) Kawasaki	Kawasaki Ninja ZX-10R	
SEN	Superbike Master Senior	(Brazil) Alex Barros	(Brazil) Alex Barros Racing	(Germany) BMW	BMW S1000RR	
LGT	Superbike Light	(Brazil) Raphael Santos	(Germany) BMW Motorrad	(Germany) BMW	BMW S1000RR	
MAS	Superbike Light Master	(Brazil) Alexandre Godói	(Netherlands) Molenaar Racing	(Japan) Kawasaki	Kawasaki Ninja ZX-10R	
EVO	Superbike Light EVO	(Brazil) André Veríssimo	(Brazil) PSBK Racing	(Japan) Kawasaki	Kawasaki Ninja ZX-10R	
STK	Superbike Light Stock	(Brazil) Osvaldo Jorge "Duende"	(Brazil) Duende Racing	(Japan) Kawasaki	Kawasaki Ninja ZX-10R	
PRO	Supersport 600 PRO	(Brazil) Leonardo Tamburro	(Brazil) Kawasaki Racing Brasil	(Japan) Kawasaki	Kawasaki Ninja ZX-6R	
STK	Supersport 600 Stock	(Brazil) Rubens Mesquita	(Mexico) Azteca Motorsport	(Japan) Kawasaki	Kawasaki Ninja ZX-6R	
MAS	Supersport 600 Master	(Brazil) Paulo Foroni	(Brazil) Giesse Team	(United Kingdom) Triumph	Triumph Daytona 675R	
EXT	Supersport 600 Extreme	(Brazil) Douglas Mangini Russo	(Brazil) Diamond Racing	(Japan) Kawasaki	Kawasaki Ninja ZX-6R	
NJA	Supersport 400 Ninja 400 Cup	(Brazil) Felipe Gonçalves	(Brazil) PSBK Racing	(Japan) Kawasaki	Kawasaki Ninja 400R	
R3	Supersport 400 R3 Cup	(Brazil) Gabrielly Lewis	(Brazil) Aust Motorsport	(Japan) Yamaha	Yamaha YZF-R3	
KTM	Supersport 400 KTM Cup	(Brazil) Arthur Costa	(Italy) Reparto Corse	(Austria) KTM	KTM DUKE 400	
400	Supersport 400 Ninja 400	(Brazil) Lincoln Lima Melo	(Brazil) Tecfil Racing Team	(Japan) Kawasaki	Kawasaki Ninja 400R	
NMT	Supersport 400 Ninja 400 Master	(Brazil) Willians Piuí	(Brazil) Cerciari Racing School	(Japan) Kawasaki	Kawasaki Ninja 400R	
MAS	Supersport 400 R3 Master	(Brazil) Fabrício Zamperetti	(Brazil) Konrad Motorsport	(Japan) Yamaha	Yamaha YZF-R3	
CBR	Supersport 400 CBR 500R	(Brazil) Fabinho da Hornet	(Brazil) JvO Racing by Downforce Motorsports	(Japan) Honda	Honda CBR 500R	
500M	Supersport 400 CBR 500 Master	(Brazil) Lucas R. da Silva	(Brazil) BHK Motorsport	(Japan) Honda	Honda CBR 500R	
300M	Supersport 400 Ninja 300 Master	(Brazil) Luís Fernando Ximenes	(Brazil) Reiter Engineering	(Japan) Kawasaki	Kawasaki Ninja 400R	
300	Supersport 400 Ninja 300	(Brazil) Thiago Medeiros	(Netherlands) Van Ommen Racing by DataLab	(Japan) Kawasaki	Kawasaki Ninja 400R	
PRO	Copa Honda CBR 650R PRO	(Brazil) Guilherme Brito	(Brazil) Motonil Motors	(Japan) Honda	Honda CBR 650R	
MAS	Copa Honda CBR 650R Master	(Brazil) Juracy Rodrigues Black	(Brazil) Design Team	(Japan) Honda	Honda CBR 650R	
LGT	Copa Honda CBR 650R Light	(Brazil) Richard Oliveira	(Brazil) EstrelaBet Autosport	(Japan) Honda	Honda CBR 650R	
EVO	Copa Honda CBR 650R EVO	(Italy) Leonardo Capezzi	(Italy) TechSport Racing	(Japan) Honda	Honda CBR 650R	
SBEC	Superbike Escola	(Brazil) Leandro Pardini	(Brazil) Scuderia Famiglia Pardini	(Germany) BMW	BMW S1000RR	
SBET	Superbike Estreante	(Argentina) Franco Pandolfino	Qatar Racing	(Japan) Yamaha	Yamaha R1 GP 1000	
SPEC	Supersport Escola	(Brazil) Luís Roberto N. Zuliani	(Brazil) Turbo Riders	(Italy) Ducati	Ducati 1199R Panigale	
SPET	Supersport Estreante	(Brazil) Pedro Kamikaze	(Brazil) Alpha Team Racing	(Japan) Kawasaki	Kawasaki Ninja ZX-10R	
CUP	Honda Junior Cup	(Brazil) Guilherme Fernandes "Foguetinho"	(Brazil) Spirit Racing	(Japan) Honda	Honda CG 160 Titan	
FEM	Honda Junior Cup Feminino	(Brazil) Giovanna Brasil	(Brazil) NP Racing	(Japan) Honda	Honda CG 160 Titan	

== See also ==
- SuperBike Brasil
- Moto 1000 GP
- Superbike World Championship
- Outline of motorcycles and motorcycling
- British Superbike Championship
- MotoAmerica
- AMA Superbike Championship
- All Japan Road Race Championship
- Australian Superbike Championship
- Grand Prix motorcycle racing
