= Antique Motorcycle Club of America =

- Founded: 1954
- Founded at: New England, USA
- Type: Charity
- Purpose: The preservation, restoration and operation of old-time motorcycles
- Region served: United States, Canada and Europe.
- Members: 11,000
- Website: antiquemotorcycle.org

The Antique Motorcycle Club of America (AMCA) was founded in 1954 in New England and is now one of the largest organizations of antique motorcycle enthusiasts in the world, with membership of over 12,000 in the United States, Australia, Canada, Europe and Japan.

== Aims ==
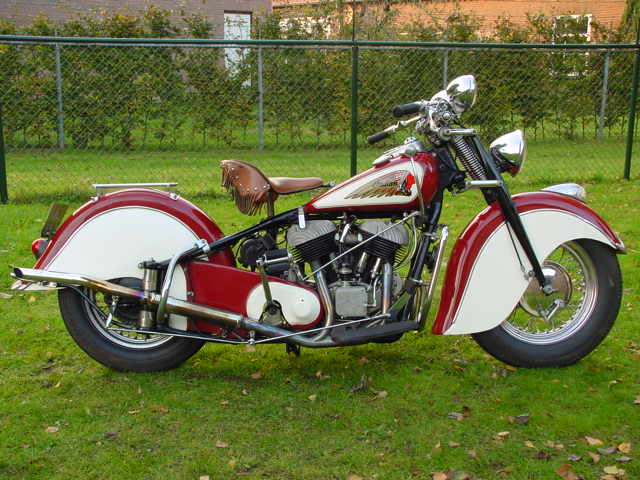
Restored 1948 Indian Chief

The AMCA aims to preserve, restore and operate motorcycles which are at least 35 years old and therefore termed "antique". Ownership of an antique motorcycle is not required to become a member.

== Board ==
The Board of Directors of the Antique Motorcycle Club of America has nine members elected for three-year terms. The AMCA President, Vice President, Secretary and Treasurer are elected by the Board for one year terms. The Board meets twice yearly.

== AMCA National Meets ==
The AMCA operates annual calendar of National Meets, where members motorcycles are judged in categories of 'Restored', 'Original Condition' and 'Period Modified'. Up to 100 points are awarded against the standard of the same motorcycle in original factory condition, with points deducted for any unoriginal features.

== Custom Culture Class ==
In 2010 the AMCA established a special Custom Culture Class to recognise the importance of custom motorcycle in the 1960s and 1970s. To comply with the AMCA's 35-year rule for antique designation Custom Culture Class motorcycles must have an engine that was sold in a production motorcycle between 1960 and 1975.

== The Antique Motorcycle magazine ==
Only available to members of the AMCA, The Antique Motorcycle magazine, published six times per year, features specialist information on antique motorcycles, including reports on 'Meets', accounts of antique motorcycle restoration projects, rare and hard to find spare parts and motorcycles for sale.

== Vintage motorcycle Virtual Library ==
A specialist web site has been funded and developed by AMCA members to provide access to literature collectors, information and technical data about motorcycles built in the USA between 1900 and 1950.

== See also ==
- Outline of motorcycles and motorcycling
