= Three-Wheeling Through Africa =

James Wilson travelogue

- Author: James Calmar Wilson
- Language: English
- Genre: Travelogue
- Set in: Present-day Nigeria, Niger, Chad, Sudan, and Eritrea
- Published: 1936
- Publisher: Bobbs-Merrill Company
- Publication place: USA

Three-Wheeling Through Africa is an autobiographical book and a best seller written by James Calmar Wilson in 1936 about the first motorcycle trip crossing the continent of Africa.

James Wilson and Francis Flood were sailing around the coast of Africa as Flood was writing travel articles for his newspaper in the United States. On a lark, Wilson talked Flood into traversing the continent on 5 horse-power single-cylinder Triumph motorcycle. They encounter many trials along the way, often resorting to pushing the bikes where the paths were not suitable as they doggedly pursue a route through jungle and desert from Lagos, Nigeria to the Red Sea. Throughout the book Wilson refers to their adventure as the "Flood-Wilson Trans-African Motorcycle Expedition". Later Lowell Thomas encouraged him to write a book. It includes many encounters with tribal people, poisonous snakes and officers and expatriates from England and France in African colonies and outposts. It was briefly reviewed in the Montreal Gazette in 1936.

Only two years prior had any motor vehicle crossed the continent, that was by automobile. Flood and Wilson chose a route that took them above Lake Chad. Flood and Wilson are noted among long-distance motorcycle riders.

== List of cities, villages and forts listed in order by Wilson in the book ==
Location	Date	Mileage	Note
Lagos, Nigeria	November 10	0	Atlantic Coast
Abeokuta	November 18	66	
Ibadan	November 20	114	
Ilorin	November 25	220	
Jebba	November 31	275	
Ushiba			2 nights from Jebba
Bida, Nupe-land	departed on December 5	406	3 days from Jebba
Zungeru			
Birnin Gwari			
Zaria			
Kano		750	
Zinder,	December 24		
Goure	December 25		
Mainé-Soroa	December 31		
N'guigmi			
Belaberum			
Lade			
Rig Rig			North of Lake Chad
Mao, Chad			
Moussoro			
D'Germana, Chad			
Hemmina			
Ati			
Abesher			modern maps show "Abeche"
Adré			
Geneina			modern maps show Al Junaynah
Kebkebia			
Darfur			
El Fasher			modern maps show Al Fashir
El Obeid			
Umm Ruwaba			
Selima			
Tendelti			
Sennar Dam			
Khartoum			
Keren			
Massawah			Red Sea, Modern day Eritrea

== Bibliography ==
- Wilson, James Calmar (1938) [1936]. Three-wheeling Through Africa (fifth ed.). Blue Ribbon Books.
