= Glossary of motorcycling terms =

This is a glossary of motorcycling terms.

advanced rider
In the UK, an advanced rider is either a police pursuit/surveillance rider or a civilian who has passed an advanced driving test via the British Motorcyclists Federation Blue Riband award, Institute of Advanced Motorists or RoSPA Advanced Drivers and Riders.
ape hangers
Aftermarket handlebars installed on motorcycles that are taller than stock handlebars. Generally, they are shoulder-height or higher for the rider. Some U.S. states and international laws restrict the height of a motorcycles handlebars.
colors
Leather or denim vest often worn by members of motorcycle clubs, especially, outlaw motorcycle clubs, identifying the club and displaying various insignia
crotch rocket
Slang for a sportbike perceived as overpowered
hang-around
Term used by some motorcycle clubs to denote someone who has stated a clear intention of becoming a prospect with the likely follow-on intention of becoming a full patch member of the club. May be one of several stages some clubs require members to pass on their way to becoming full-patch members.
nomad
one percenter
A member of an outlaw club or gang.
prospect
Term used by some motorcycle clubs to denote someone who has stated a clear intention of becoming a full patch member of the club. Typically, the bylaws or other governing document\policy will dictate how long someone must be a prospect and what is expected of them during this period. May be one of several stages some clubs require members to pass on their way to becoming full-patch members.
Rich Urban Bikers (RUBS)
A cruiser bike buying demographic, typically middle aged male in a white-collar work with a disposable income and usually, grown-up children.
Riding pillion (a.k.a. riding bitch; riding two-up)
The act of riding as a passenger on a motorcycle sitting on the pillion (a.k.a. "bitch") seat immediately behind the driver of the motorcycle.
Road rash
An injury caused by scraping your skin on the road surface. This is likely because the rider wasn't wearing the right protective gear.
Spill
Refers to falling off your bike or taking a tumble, as in to ‘have a spill’.
Sweep
The last, or tail, rider in organized group of motorcyclists riding on a public road. Like the leader, the sweep is experienced and aware of the planned route, and may carry supplies for first aid or breakdowns.

== See also ==
- Glossary of motorsport terms
