= James Wilson (motorcyclist) =

Long-distance motorcyclist (1901–1995)

James C. Wilson (October 8, 1900 – January 31, 1995) was a long-distance motorcyclist and author of the autobiography Three-Wheeling Through Africa. His five-month 1927 journey from Nigeria to Eritrea on a Triumph sidecar with Francis Flood may have been the first motorized crossing of Africa by motorcycle.

After a United States tour in the late 1930s promoting his travels and book, Wilson resided in Polk, Nebraska where he was a corn farmer.

Photographs he published in National Geographic were used in a 21st century MIT anthropology course.

== Bibliography ==
- Wilson, James Calmar (1936). Three-wheeling Through Africa (first ed.). Indianapolis: Bobbs-Merrill Company. ASIN B000856L32.
