= Federation of European Motorcyclists =

Motorcycling advocacy group

The Federation of European Motorcyclists (FEM) was a motorcycling advocacy group based in Brussels, Belgium. It was formed in 1988 by representatives of various national motorcyclists' representative organizations at a meeting in Strasbourg This meeting followed the "Eurodemo" of that year, a major demonstration by motorcyclists protesting against what they perceived to be anti-biker European legislation.

The FEM's first General Secretary was the Briton Frank Pearson who served in the role until 1992. He was succeeded by another Briton, Simon Milward. On January 10, 1998, the FEM merged with the European Motorcyclists' Association to form the Federation of European Motorcyclists Associations.

== See also ==
- ABATE
- American Motorcyclist Association
- British Motorcyclists Federation
- Helmet Law Defense League (HLDL)
