= Chery Fulwin A9L =

Range extender full-size sedan

- Chery Fulwin A9 (pre-production)

Overview
- Manufacturer: Chery
- Model code: E01
- Also called: Exeed ES7
- Production: July 2025 – present
- Assembly: China: Wuhu, Anhui

Body and chassis
- Class: Full-size car
- Body style: 4-door sedan; 5-door station wagon (GT)
- Layout: Front-engine + Front-motor, front-wheel-drive; Front-engine + Dual-motors, four-wheel-drive
- Platform: E0X

Powertrain
- Engine: Petrol plug-in hybrid: 1.5 L SQRH4J15 turbo I4
- Electric motor: 1x or 2x permanent magnet motor: 160 kW (215 hp; 218 PS) (FWD); 355 kW (476 hp; 483 PS) (AWD)
- Power output: 270 kW (362 hp; 367 PS) (FWD); 470 kW (630 hp; 639 PS) (AWD)
- Transmission: 1-speed DHT (Dedicated Hybrid Transmission)
- Hybrid drivetrain: PHEV
- Battery: 33.7 kWh LFP Gotion
- Range: Maximum 2,000 km (1,200 mi)
- Electric range: 200 km (120 mi) (CLTC)

Dimensions
- Wheelbase: 3,000 mm (118.1 in)
- Length: 5,018 mm (197.6 in)
- Width: 1,965 mm (77.4 in)
- Height: 1,500 mm (59.1 in)
- Curb weight: 2,085–2,230 kg (4,597–4,916 lb)

The Chery Fulwin A9L (Chinese: 奇瑞风云A9L; pinyin: Qíruì Fēngyún A9L) is a range extender full-size sedan produced by Chery since 2025.

== Overview ==
=== Chery Arrizo Star Concept ===
The design of the Fulwin A9L was first previewed as the Chery Arrizo Star Concept shown during 2023 Auto Shanghai.

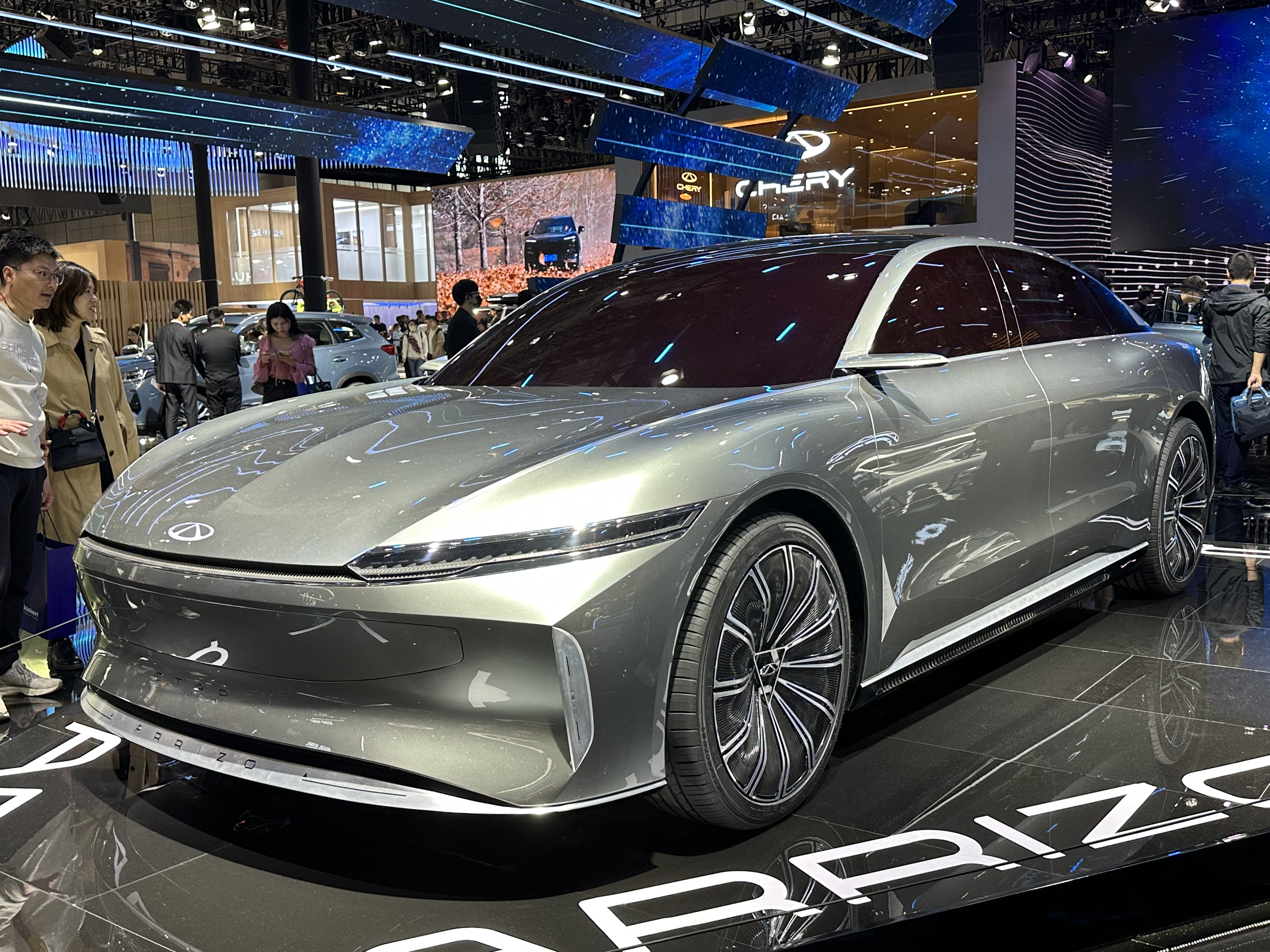
Chery Arrizo Star concept

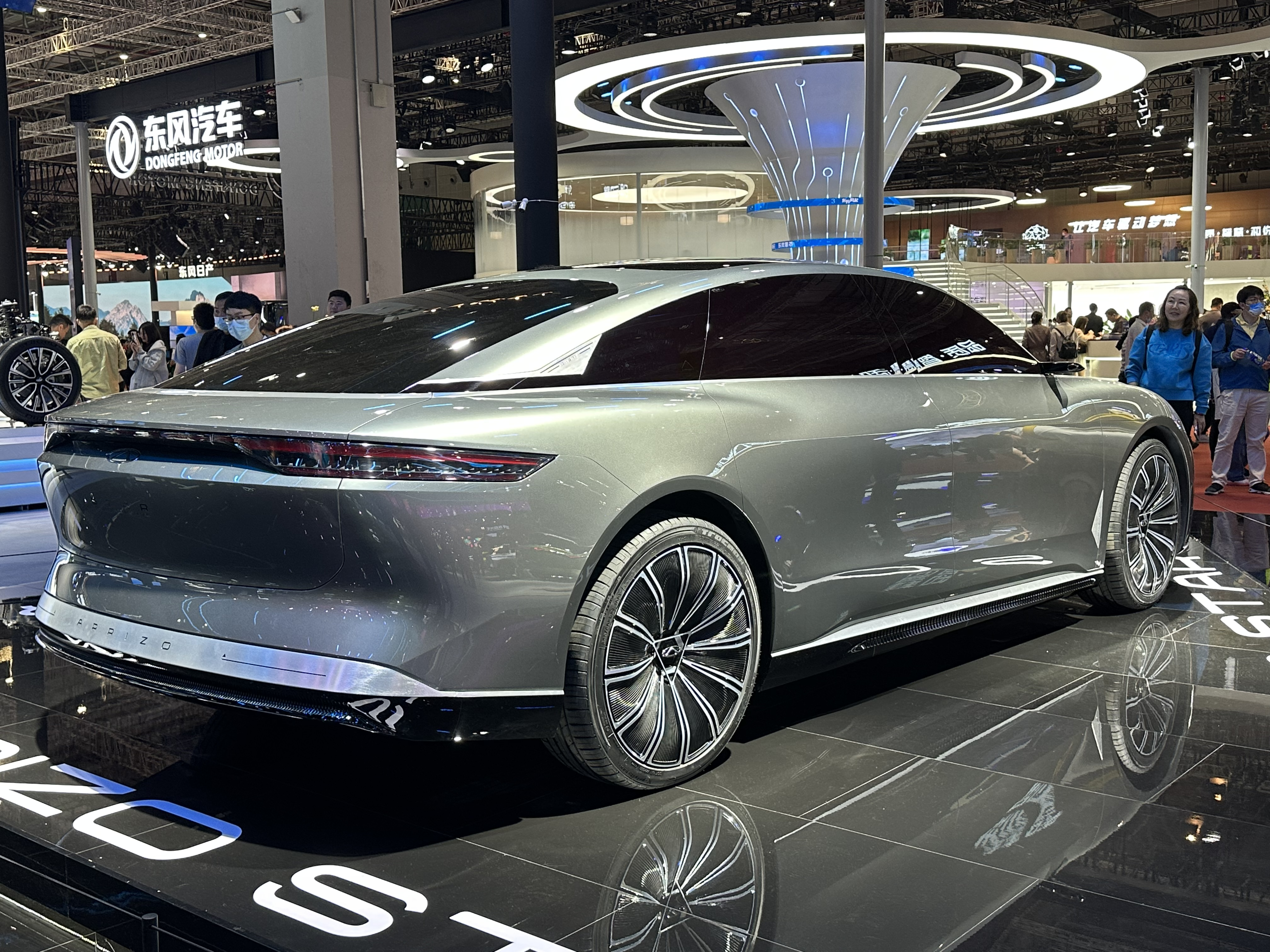
Rear view

=== Chery Fulwin A9 Concept ===
The pre-production Fulwin A9L was first revealed concept car called as the Chery Fulwin A9 Concept at the launch of the Fulwin sub-brand in September 2023, with the concept appearing at several auto shows.

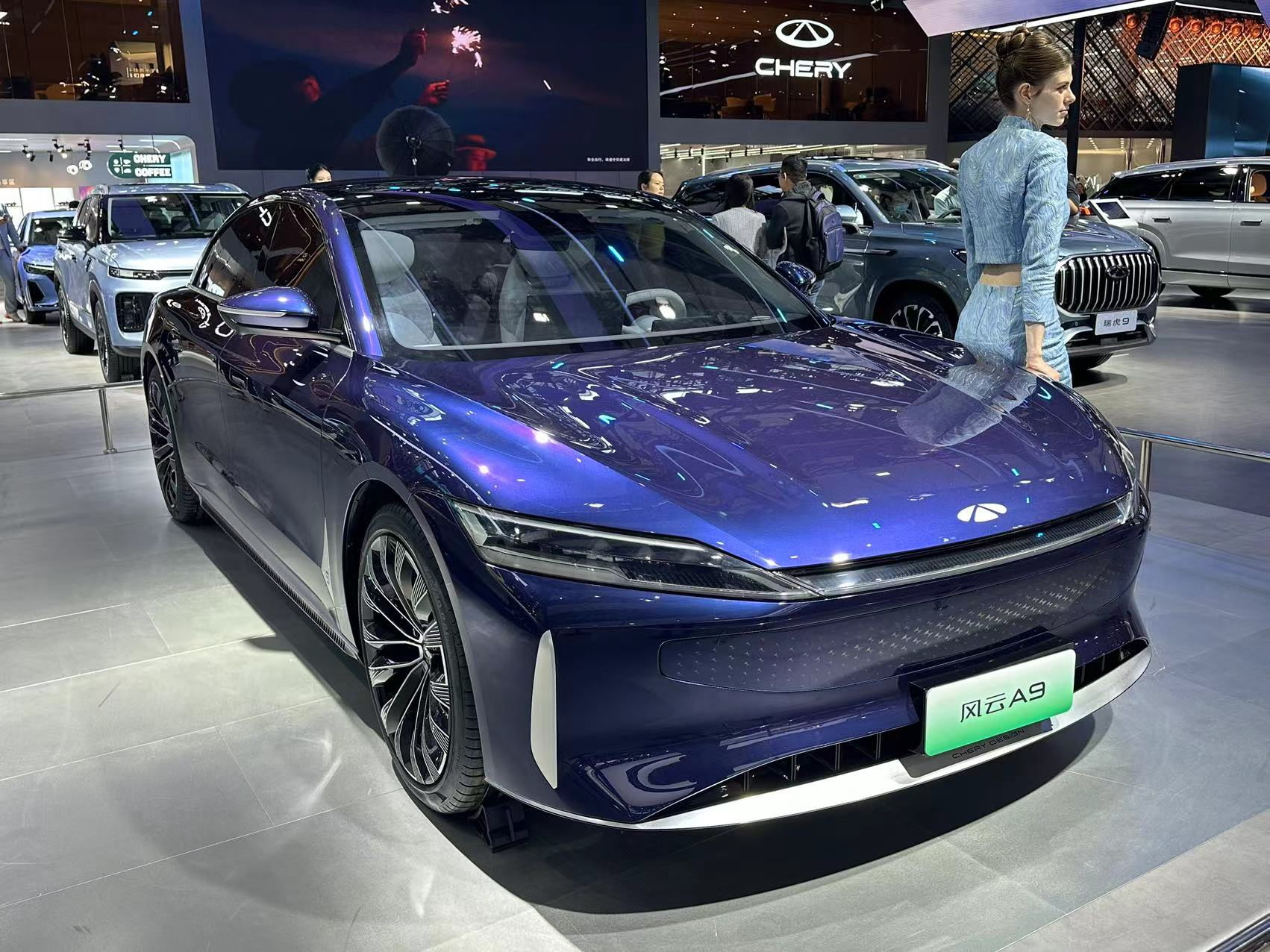
Chery Fulwin A9 concept

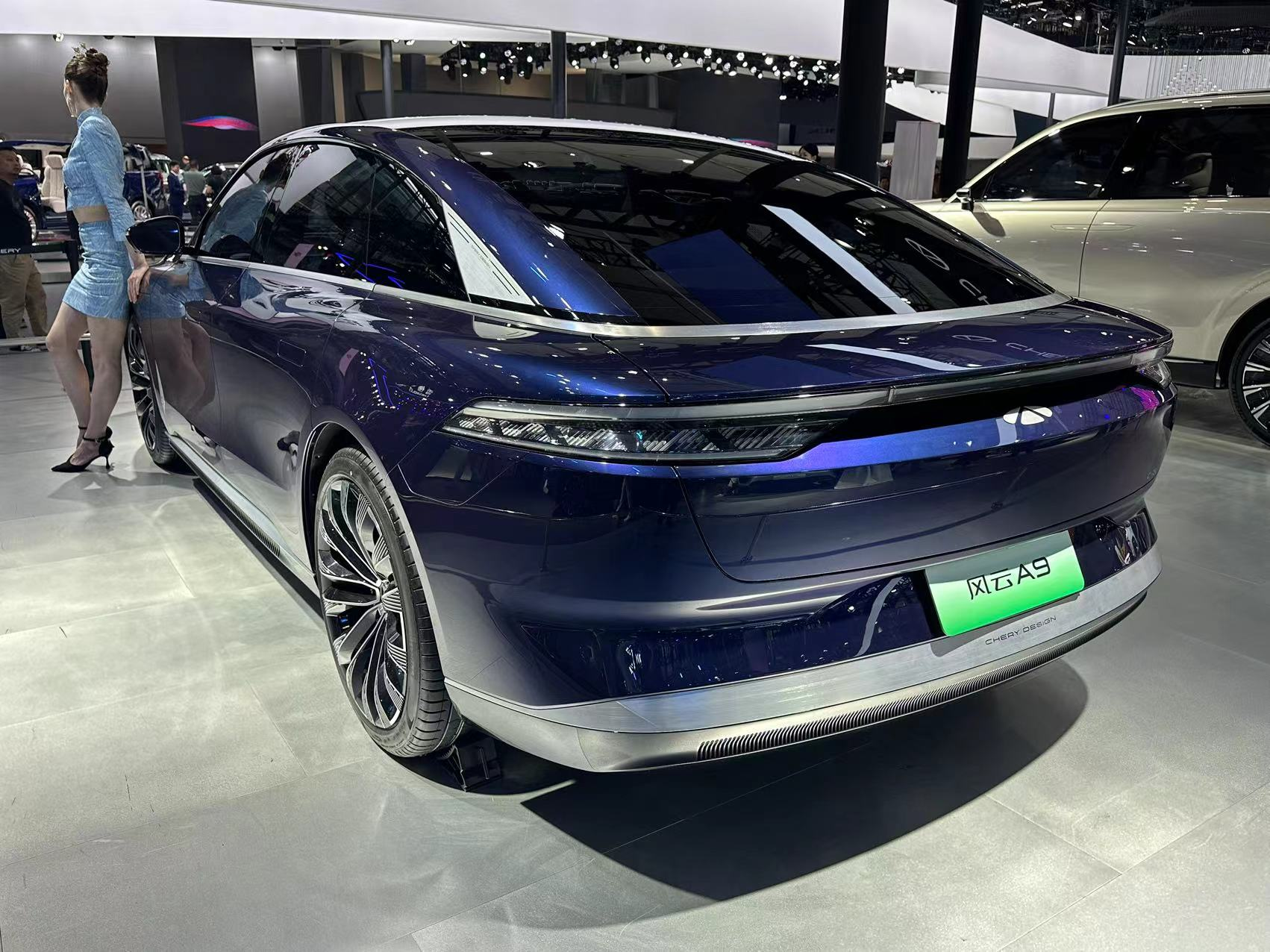
Rear view

== Production model ==
Exterior images of the production version were revealed on October 8, 2024 when the brand showcased the available paint colors. Pre-orders for the vehicle are expected to open in April 2025, and the launch is expected by June 2025. The exterior of the A9L has dot-matrix LED lighting elements at the front, and an active deploying rear wing, with a light bar design used for both the daytime running lights and taillights. The A9L is available in nine paint colours: Wonderland Green, Snow Ridge White, Bibo Blue, Ningye Purple, Xuanye Blue, Danfeng Red, Cuizhu Green, Moshi Black, and Tanhai Green. It is equipped with a choice of 18 or 20-inch wheels.

The interior features a floating 15.6-inch infotainment display which has most controls integrated, and digital instrument cluster, both powered by a Qualcomm Snapdragon 8255. The dashboard features rectangular air vents, and the center console features dual wireless charging pads ahead of two circular cupholders and a split-opening storage bin. The interior is decorated with dual-tone quilt-patterned upholstery, wood paneling and silver metallic accents on the doors and dashboard. It is equipped with a 23-speaker sound system, a two-panel sunroof, ambient lighting, acoustic glass, and a head-up display.

It is available with Chery's Falcon 700 ADAS system, which has a 27-sensor suite including one LiDAR, three mmWave radars, 11 cameras, and 12 ultrasonic sensors. The system is capable of supervised autonomous driving in urban and highway conditions, and supports automatic parking and summoning.

The A9L uses Chery's Kunpeng super hybrid C-DM plug-in hybrid system, which consists of a 1.5-litre turbocharged petrol engine and electric motors providing all-wheel drive. The engine has an output of 115 kW (154 hp; 156 PS). The battery has an LFP chemistry and is supplied by Gotion. The vehicle has a top speed of 180 kilometres per hour (112 mph).

It was initially introduced as the Fulwin A9 in 2025, before the name was transferred to a smaller model.

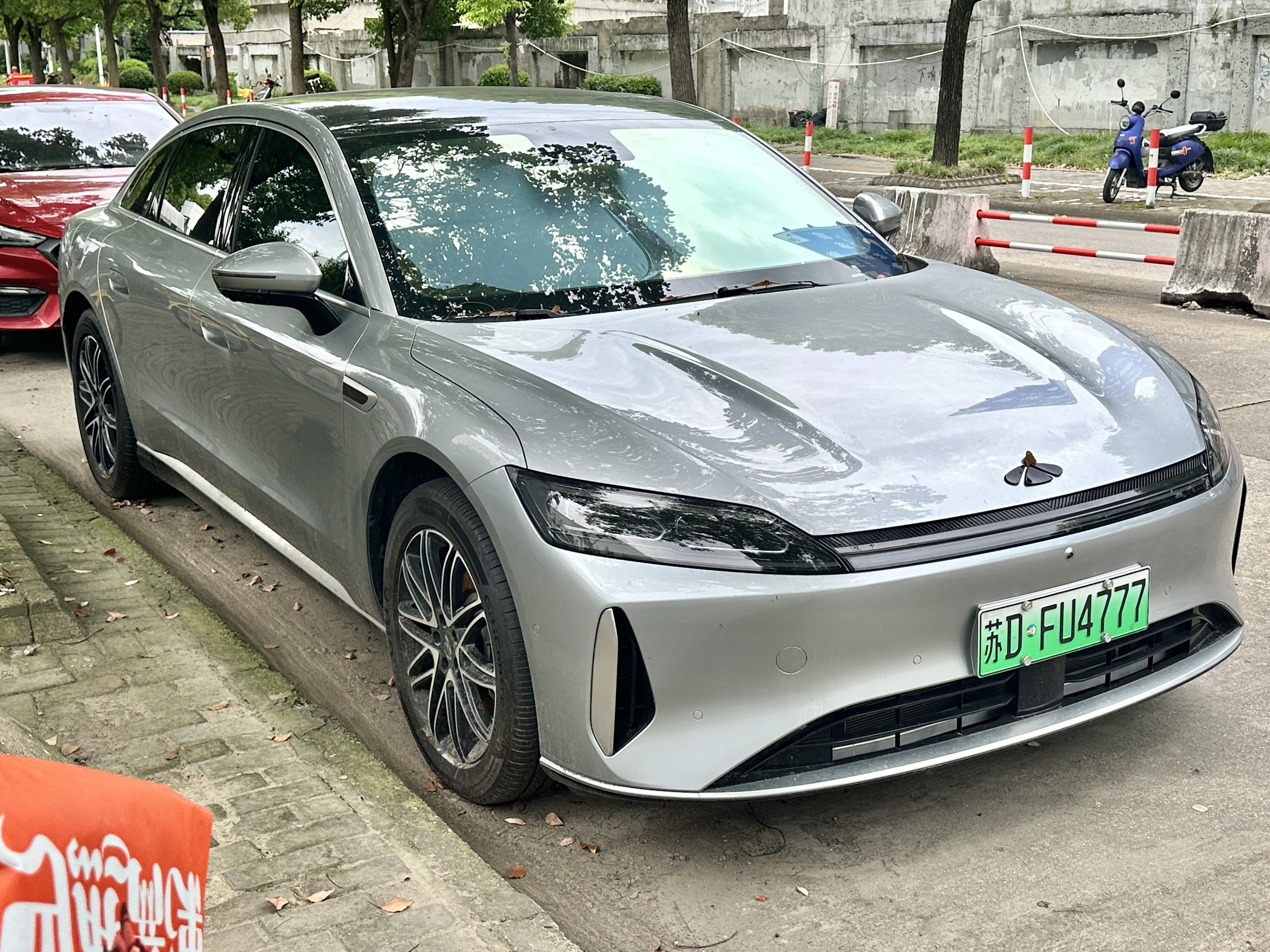
Chery Fulwin A9L (production)

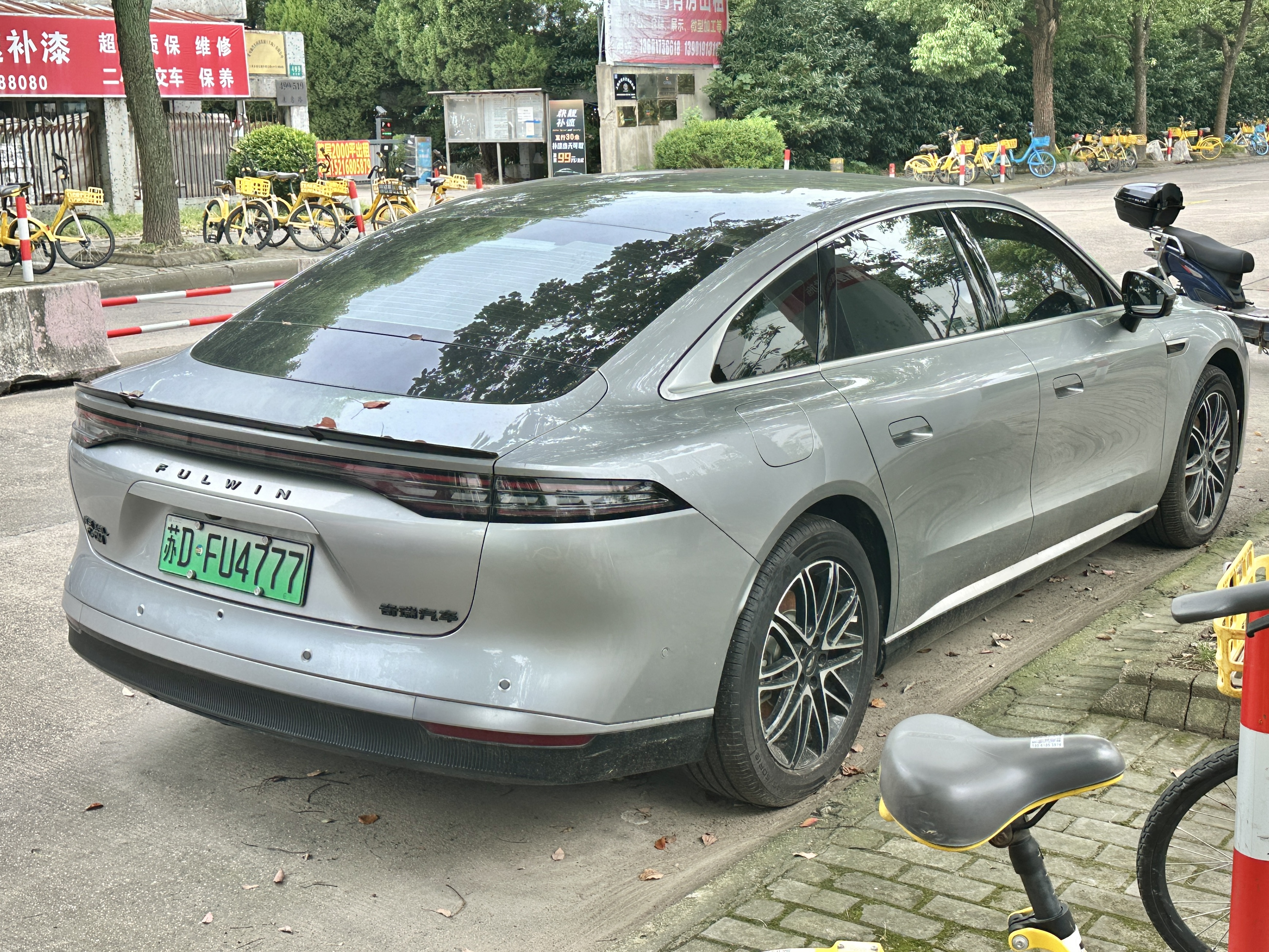
Rear view

== Sales ==
Year	China
2025	44,783
