= Simon Milward =

British motorcycle rider

- SimonZambezi.jpg
- Born: 28 January 1965; Strete, Devon, UK
- Died: March 4, 2005 (aged 40); Mali
- Known for: Federation of European Motorcyclists Associations (FEMA) General Secretary, long-distance motorcycle riding

Simon Milward (born Strete, Devon, UK, 28 January 1965; died in Mali, 4 March 2005) served as the General Secretary of the Federation of European Motorcyclists' Associations (FEMA), based in Brussels, Belgium, from 1992 to 1999. In this role, he represented motorcyclists within the institutions of the European Union on matters concerning road safety and consumer issues.

After a collision with a car resulted in his hospitalisation, Milward decided to ride a motorcycle around the world to raise funds for international medical aid. This journey, known as the Millennium Ride, commenced in 2000.

In May 2002, Milward helped establish a pilot project entitled Health for All on the remote Indonesian island of Flores. Based on the "zero breakdown" principles of Riders for Health, the project is now funded by the charity Motorcycle Outreach.

Simon continued his journey through Latin America and then through Africa, travelling north from South Africa.

Milward died in a road accident in Mali on 4 March 2005. He was cremated in his home town of Exeter in South-West England.
