= Motorcycle Outreach =

Motorcycle Outreach is a charitable non-profit organisation which works to introduce effective healthcare delivery in remote areas of developing countries. Motorcycle Outreach was inspired by Riders for Health and applies the best practices from that organisation's success to countries outside the African continent.

Motorcycle Outreach (MoR) supports an established project in East Nusa Tenggara in Indonesia. Health for All (HfA) provides primary healthcare transport for a catchment area of over fifty thousand people living in over fifty villages.

Healthcare delivery by motorcycle has significantly improved the general health of the population in the areas served.

== Significance ==
Effective healthcare delivery is the missing link in many health initiatives in the developing world. Trained health workers, perishable vaccines and improved facilities are of little use without reliable transport. The traditional solution of one-off contributions of vehicles delivers very little real value without informed vehicle choice, spare parts distribution and a budget for a servicing schedule.

In contrast, the addition of reliable transport to an existing healthcare system has a disproportionate positive effect. This is reflected in the statement that as little as US$10 positively benefits 10,000 people by enabling regular village visits.

Motorcycle Outreach highlights this gap and works to fill it both through support of an established project in Indonesia and promoting the solution as a way to improve aid delivery.

== Need ==
In the 2007 Indonesian Health Survey women were asked whether they have problems seeking medical advice or treatment for themselves. The most often cited problem is getting money for treatment (25 percent). Other concerns include distance to health facility (15 percent), having to take transport (13 percent), and concern that no female worker is available (11 percent).

Reliable transport enabling regular village healthcare visits helps to address each of these issues.

== History ==
Motorcycle Outreach was set up by Simon Milward in 2002 to fund Health for All which he had founded in Indonesia. It was officially constituted as a UK Charity and Ltd company in late 2005, with its Directors drawn from the late Simon Milward's family and close friends. The official Charity was launched in November 2005, with a series of events, the most notable being a BMW Motorrad supported motorcycle ride to The Gambia, West Africa by David French and Craig Carey-Clinch. As of 2010, MoR continued to support HfA in Flores, Indonesia.

The UK offices are based in London.
