= Fangchengbao Ti9 =

Range extended full-size SUV

Overview
- Manufacturer: BYD Auto
- Production: 2026–present
- Assembly: China
- Designer: Under the lead of Wolfgang Egger

Body and chassis
- Class: Full-size SUV
- Body style: 5-door SUV
- Layout: Front-engine, dual-motor, all-wheel-drive
- Platform: DMS platform
- Chassis: Unibody

Powertrain
- Engine: Petrol range extender: 1.5 L BYD472ZQB turbo I4
- Electric motor: 200 kW TZ210XYD PMSM (front); 200 kW TZ200XSAE or TZ200XSBN PMSM (rear)
- Power output: 536 hp (400 kW; 543 PS)
- Hybrid drivetrain: Series hybrid (EREV)
- Battery: 66.48 kWh Blade 2.0 LFP
- Range: 1,630 km (1,013 mi)
- Electric range: 310 km (193 mi) (WLTP); 400 km (249 mi) (CLTC)

Dimensions
- Wheelbase: 3,130 mm (123.2 in)
- Length: 5,270 mm (207.5 in)
- Width: 1,999 mm (78.7 in)
- Height: 1,850–1,880 mm (72.8–74.0 in)
- Curb weight: 2,865–2,965 kg (6,316–6,537 lb)

The Fangchengbao Ti9 (Chinese: 方程豹 钛9; lit. 'Formula leopard Titanium 9') is a range extended full-size SUV manufactured by BYD Auto under the Fangchengbao brand.

== Overview ==
The Ti9 was first teased by Fangchengbao on 3 August, 2026. It is positioned as the brand's flagship vehicle, with dimensions larger than that of the Bao 8, the current largest Fangchengbao vehicle. From China MIIT documents, rear badging shows that it sits on a new "DMS" platform. The Ti9 is a 6-seater version and is equipped with BYD's sixth generation DM-i hybrid technology.

The Ti9 adopts an exterior design language similar to other Fangchengbao vehicles, including a variation of the dual-line daytime running light signature, chiseled body panels and a boxy shape.

The Ti9 uses double wishbone front and five-link independent rear suspension geometries and is equipped with the DiSus-A dual-chamber air suspension system and ±7° of rear-wheel steering as standard.

Its interior features a 30-inch display that combines central infotainment features with the front passenger display, a 12.3-inch LCD instrument cluster, a 50-inch AR-HUD, and a 21.4-inch ceiling-mounted rear entertainment display. A 2+2+2 six-seat configuration is used with heating, ventilation and massaging functions across all three rows. Furthermore, the front passenger and second row seats are equipped with zero-gravity functions and a "Cradle Mode", which slowly rocks the seats forward and aft for passengers to rest. Additional features include a 11.3 L (0.40 cu ft) refrigerator in the front center console, 31-speaker Devialet sound system, a 6.6-inch touchscreen remote control, far-infrared cabin heating system, and a total of 14 accessory mounting points including 7 magnetic mounts, 4 tablet interfaces, and 2 threaded mounts with USB-C power ports. It has a 655-litre (23.1 cu ft) rear cargo which expands to 655 litres (23.1 cu ft) with the seats folded down, and a split tailgate with the lower section rated for a 300 kg (660 lb) load.

The Smart Cabin top trim is equipped with a drive-by-wire steering and braking system and features a remote 1.1-meter dashboard spanning driver display and a steering wheel which can fold into the dashboard within 10 seconds.

Rear view

Interior

== Powertrain and specifications ==
The Ti9 uses BYD's new DMS hybrid system. It is a series hybrid system which uses 200 kW (268 hp; 272 PS) permanent magnet synchronous motors on the front and rear axle. The rear axle motor can vector 100% of torque to either wheel and can disconnect at the wheel end to reduce energy consumption when needed.

The Ti9 features torque-based body stabilization, rear wheel steering, high-speed tire blowout stability control, the iATS intelligent all-terrain recognition system, and BYD's God's Eye B driver assistance system.

It is offered exclusively with an extended-range hybrid powertrain, consisting of a 1.5-liter turbocharged gasoline engine producing a maximum power of 110 kW (150 hp) and two electric motors each producing 200 kW (270 hp).

It uses a 66.48 kWh lithium-iron-phosphate (LFP) BYD Blade 2.0 battery pack that provides up to 310 km (190 mi) of pure electric WLTP range. It supports BYD's 1500 W Flash Charger network, which can recharge the battery from 10–70% in 5 minutes and 10–97% in 9 minutes.
