= Federation of European Motorcyclists Associations =

Association of motorcycling advocacy groups

Federation of European Motorcyclists' Associations
- Abbreviation: FEMA
- Founded: 1998
- Founded at: Brussels, Belgium
- Type: Charity
- Purpose: Riders' rights umbrella organisation
- Region served: European Union
- Members: Represents nearly 350,000
- President: Anna Zee
- Key people: Dolf Willigers, General Secretary Jim Freeman, Treasurer
- Website: www.femamotorcycling.eu

The Federation of European Motorcyclists' Associations (FEMA) is a motorcycling advocacy group based in Brussels, Belgium. It was formed on 10 January 1998 from a merger of the Federation of European Motorcyclists (FEM) and the European Motorcyclists' Association (EMA).

== History ==
From its inception FEMA has been headquartered at Rue des Champs 62, 1040 Brussels, Belgium in the offices previously used by its forerunner FEM.

FEMA's first General Secretary was Simon Milward who had previously served since 1992 as the General Secretary of the Federation of European Motorcyclists.

The merger created a pan-European riders' rights organisation ranging from Scandinavia in the north to Greece in the south and from Ireland in the west to the Czech republic in the east. It also brought together national organisations who continued to compete with each other for members within their own territories such as the Motorcycle Action Group and the British Motorcyclists Federation in the UK, and the BVDM (Bundesverband der Motorradfahrer), Kuhle Wampe and Biker Union in Germany.

In 1999 the FEMA member groups met with other motorcyclists' organisations and motorcycle industry representatives from across the globe in Mulhouse, France. It was at this conference that Neil Liversidge also authored the 'Mulhouse Declaration', that:

- 'We the undersigned utterly oppose the compulsory fitment to privately owned vehicles of any device designed to arbitrarily remove control from the driver to remote operation.
- We note with extreme concern the tendency of governments to impose ever more intrusive and restrictive regulations upon the citizen.
- We caution governments to remember that they are permitted to govern only by the consent of the people and that such consent when given through an election does not grant unlimited licence to interfere in the daily life of the citizen.
- We further caution all governments that to impose unduly on popular freedom is to imperil the respect in which government and the rule of law is held.'

The declaration received the unanimous support of the delegates present.

=== Founding members ===
Founding member organisations of FEMA were:

- Motorcycle Action Group (MAG UK)
- British Motorcyclists Federation (UK)
- MAG Ireland
- MCTC - Landsforeningen for motorcyklister (DK)
- Luxembourg Moto Initiativ (LMI) (Luxembourg)
- Fédération Française des Motards en Colère (FFMC) (France)
- DMC (Denmark)
- Coordinamento Motociclisti (Italy)
- SMC (Sweden)
- Federacao Nacional Motociclismo (FNM) (Portugal)
- MAG Belgium
- IG Motorrad Schweiz (Switzerland)
- Bikers Co-operation (Germany)
- Biker Union (Germany)
- Kuhle Wampe (Verband der Motorradclubs Kuhle Wampe) (Germany)
- Bundesverband der Motorradfahrer (BVDM) (Germany)
- MMS Hungary
- MAG Austria
- Cyprus Motorcycle Federation
- Motoe (Greece)
- SMOTO (Finland)
- MP69 (Finland)
- Bifhjólasamtök Lýðveldisins Sniglar (Iceland)
- MAG Netherlands
- Norsk Motorcykkel Union (Norway)
- CMRC (Cyprus)

== See also ==
- Motorcycling
- ABATE
- American Motorcyclist Association
- Helmet Law Defense League (HLDL)
