= State motorcyclists' rights organizations =

Group of US-based advocacy organizations

State motorcyclists' rights organizations (SMROs) exist in about 32 US states, 25 of which call themselves "ABATE of (state name)," the rest going by various other names. SMROs advocate for a point of view in motorcycling that is, in general, opposed to mandatory helmet laws, required motorcycle safety inspections, mandatory rider training and licensing, and other similar regulation. Instead SMROs favor optional or voluntary motorcycle rider safety education, training, and licensing, and greater public awareness of motorcyclist safety issues. They also favor stronger penalties for car driver infractions such as right of way violations, or when drivers are at fault in accidents that harm motorcycle riders. SMRO activities include lobbying legislatures, letter writing campaigns, and paying for public service announcements and political advertisements. To carry out lobbying at the national level, a coalition of SMRO's created the Motorcycle Riders Foundation (MRF) to lobby in Washington DC. The SMROs and MRF are often allied with the American Motorcyclist Association (AMA) on legislative issues.

== ABATE ==
ABATE is an acronym which originally stood for "A Brotherhood Against Totalitarian Enactments" and alternatively stands for "American Bikers Against Totalitarian Enactments", "A Brotherhood Aimed Towards Education", "American Bikers for Awareness, Training & Education", "American Bikers Aimed Towards Education", "American Bikers Advocating Training & Education" with other combination used.

== Concept ==
The concept of ABATE began with Lou Kimzey, editor of Easyriders magazine in 1972. He and others saw the need for bikers to organize to fight against federal and state restrictions on motorcycling. Some 35 years later, most states have a state motorcyclists' rights organizations (SMRO), either called ABATE or some other name. October 1977 Lou Kimzey and Easyriders were relinquishing the organization to the people attending the meeting in Sacramento.

In 1986, many ABATE organizations met at what became the "Meeting of the Minds" conference. This conference began the process of SMROs working together and eventually led to the founding of the Motorcycle Rider's Foundation (MRF) which is considered a Motorcycle Rights Organization (MRO) based in Washington DC. This group of SMROs acted to eliminate federal helmet law requirements, make sure motorcycles are part of transportation planning and ensure that motorcycles are allowed on all public roads.

MRF is an organization set up in Washington DC to watch over motorcycle legislation and to take action when the federal government has an agenda that would not be motorcycle friendly. SMRO's including ABATE work with the MRF and most have a state officer involved in the MRF. ABATE organization use the MRF to share state information, and get more information on a federal level as well as information from other states. Most SMRO and ABATE groups work with other (MRO) groups besides the MRF, such as the American Motorcyclist Association. Many ABATE organizations have websites, and most often list the other groups they are involved with, work with, from national MRO groups, insurance programs, lawyers, and rider training or safety and education programs.

ABATE was formed in response to keep motorcycle choppers, with extended front ends that were deemed unsafe, on the road; but now SMROs deal with a large variety of motorcycling related issues. Motorcycle safety training, health insurance issues and road engineering with respect to motorcycles are all areas dealt with by ABATE organizations. Many states' rider training programs are either run by or administered by ABATE organizations. ABATE of Arizona runs a Motorcycle Awareness Program or MAP.

ABATE groups also are involved in charity events like Toy Runs, food drives and first responder/EMT training. But ABATE is still a political organization exerting political clout through the activities of member motorcyclists. ABATE chapters exist in most states. ABATE is not a motorcycle club, nor is it a Harley riders only organization.

== Motorcycle Awareness Program ==
The Motorcycle Awareness Program (MAP), commonly referred to as The MAP Program or Share The Road Program, is an American creation of the combined efforts of various state motorcyclists' rights organizations. This program is geared toward teaching the driving public to maintain a greater awareness of the motorcyclists with whom they share the road. The success of the program has led to similar initiatives throughout the world.

=== Arizona ===
ABATE of Arizona's MAP, is coordinated by the State Safety Officer of the organization, and is presented with the help of many members of the MRO's (ABATE and MMA of AZ) and Motorcycle Clubs throughout Arizona.

MAP Certified Instructors guest lecture in driver's education classes throughout the region. The lecture includes information about how to "Share the Road" with motorcycles, vulnerability of motorcyclists, instructional videos and handouts, and an on-site riding demonstration to help visualize information presented.

Funding for the MAP Program is provided by the membership of ABATE of Arizona, through their various fund raising events and membership dues. Additionally, some product and advertising funds are provided by the Motorcycle Safety Fund, made up of one dollar added registration tax on motorcycles within the state, through the Governor's Office of Highway Safety.

== Criticism ==
ABATE chapters have been criticized for the appearance of hypocrisy in their road safety message, in that while their public service advertisements aimed to get drivers to be more aware of motorcycles are helpful, the chapters undermine that message by opposing mandatory helmet laws, and by appearing to encourage alcohol consumption while riding.

The traffic and commuting beat columnist for The Baltimore Sun, Michael Dresser, wrote in July 2007 that, "While ABATE [of Maryland's] message is great, there are some problems with the messenger. [...] ABATE's arguments against helmet laws are largely based on the dubious premise that they violate individual rights or invade privacy. Gimme a break. Maryland has invested billions of dollars to build a public road system. So if the state decides to require users of that network to take steps to avoid spilling the contents of their skulls on public pavement, it is well within its rights." Dresser further criticizes the practice of holding the majority of Maryland ABATE chapter meetings in bars, pointing out his observation that one meeting place is at an open air bar where motorcycle riders can often be seen consuming alcohol before noon. Dresser contrasts this with the Motorcycle Safety Foundation, which has urged riders to not consume even one drink before riding, saying that even a road-legal blood alcohol level of 0.05% increases a rider's risk by 40 times, due to the greater challenge of motorcycle riding compared to driving a car.

In response to a deluge of counter-points and demands for an apology, Dresser ran a second column in which he offered 7 point-by-point rebuttals to the letters from ABATE members. Among the objections were that Dresser was unfairly perpetuating a stereotype of rowdy, irresponsibly-drunk bikers, and that due to this negative stereotype, the ABATE chapter had been turned down by more than 40 taverns before they found one to accept them. Members also said that even though more than 100 years would pass until motorcycles would be invented, the Founding Fathers of the United States also met in taverns to plan the revolution. Dresser was also criticized for emphasizing the helmet law issue, when in fact Maryland ABATE had made increased penalties for right-of-way violators a top legislative priority, and had assisted handicapped people in getting disabled parking permit license plates. In response to readers who emphasized the freedom of choice argument against helmet laws, Dresser replied that, "Freedom is a much-abused word. There are essential freedoms -- free speech, free press, habeas corpus, religion, the ballot, to name a few -- that are worth fighting for. Then there's simply foolish behavior we're used to getting away with."

The following week, Dresser ran a third column in which he quoted letters from motorcyclists who were also uncomfortable with ABATE's anti-helmet law position, and from some ABATE members who agreed that the organization was excessively focused on alcohol consumption at their gatherings. Several other correspondents told anecdotes of helmet laws saving riders' lives, and others noted that the image of motorcyclists was not only harmed by hard-drinking middle-aged cruiser riders, which they saw as the ABATE demographic, but also by packs of young males speeding and doing stunts on sport bikes.

== See also ==
- Motorcycling
- Motorcycling advocacy
- American Motorcyclist Association
- British Motorcyclists Federation
- Federation of European Motorcyclists Associations
- Helmet Law Defense League (HLDL)
