= Arcfox Alpha S5 =

Mid-size sedan

Arcfox αS5
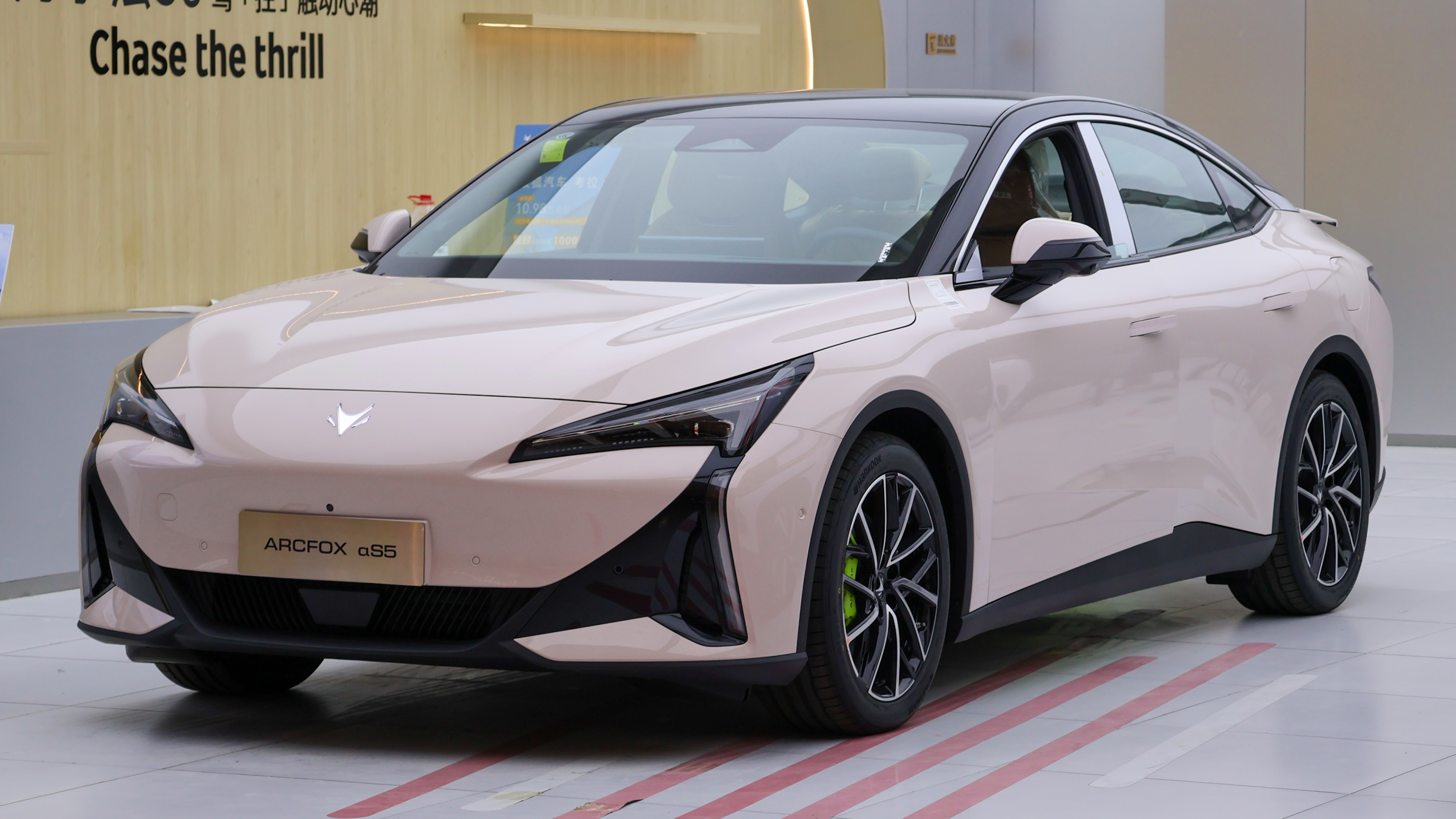

Overview
- Manufacturer: Arcfox (BAIC Group)
- Production: 2024–present
- Assembly: China: Zhenjiang

Body and chassis
- Class: Mid-size car (D)
- Body style: 4-door sedan
- Layout: Front-motor, front-wheel drive; Dual-motor, all-wheel drive

Powertrain
- Engine: Petrol range extender: 1.5 L A156A1 I4
- Electric motor: Permanent magnet synchronous (primary); AC induction (secondary)
- Power output: 185–390 kW (248–523 hp; 252–530 PS)
- Transmission: 1-speed direct-drive reduction
- Battery: 64.8 kWh LFP CATL; 74.4 kWh NMC CATL; 79.2 kWh LFP CATL
- Range: 1,220 km (758 mi) (EREV, WLTP)
- Electric range: 560–750 km (348–466 mi) (EV, CLTC); 175 km (109 mi) (EREV, WLTP); 230 km (143 mi) (EREV, CLTC)
- Plug-in charging: DC: 160–404 kW

Dimensions
- Wheelbase: 2,900 mm (114 in)
- Length: 4,820 mm (190 in); 4,886 mm (192 in) (facelift)
- Width: 1,930 mm (76 in)
- Height: 1,480 mm (58 in)
- Curb weight: 1,885–2,120 kg (4,156–4,674 lb)

The Arcfox αS5 (Chinese: 极狐阿尔法S5) is a battery electric and range extender mid-size sedan manufactured by BAIC under the Arcfox brand.

== Overview ==
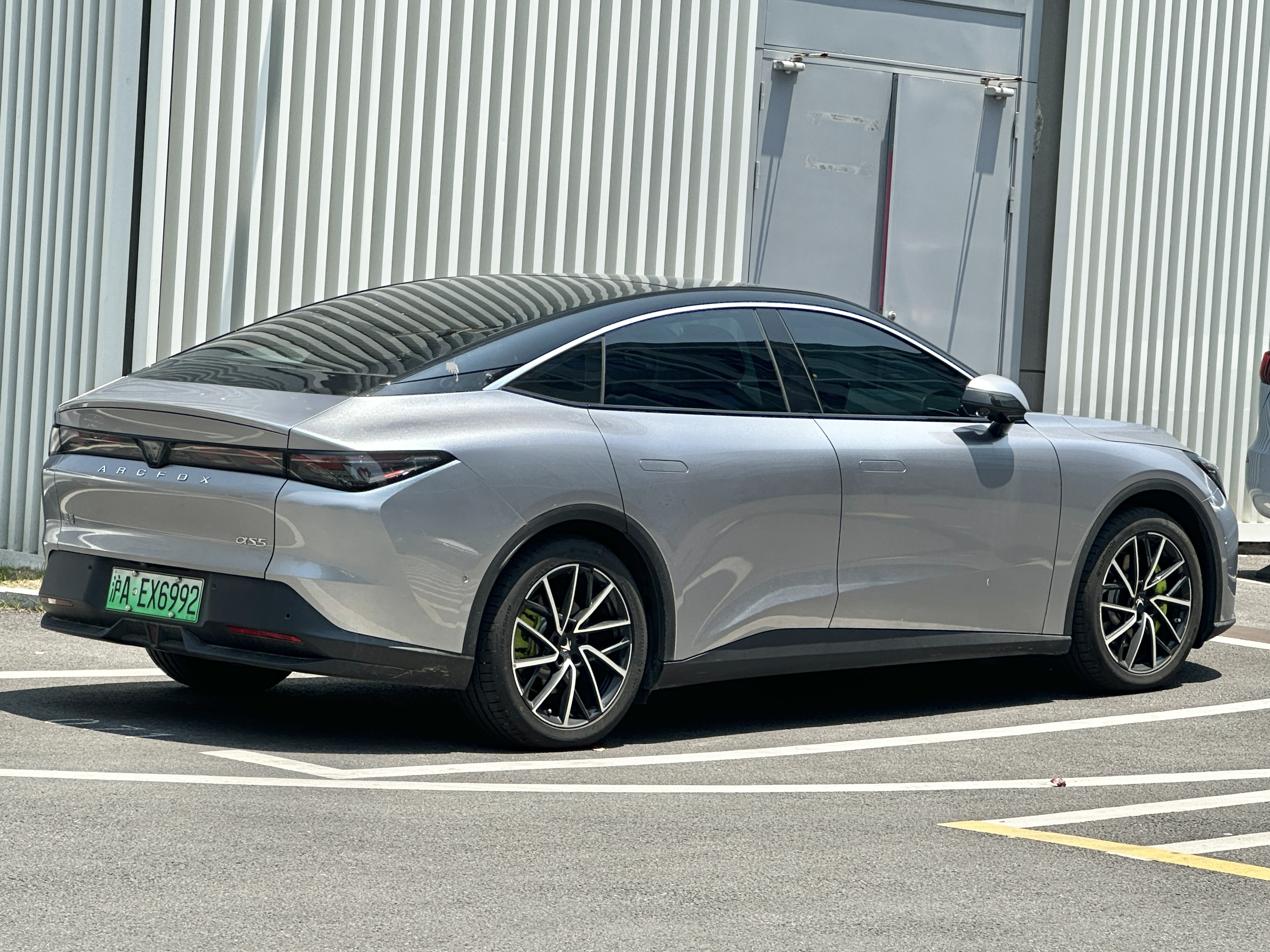
Rear view

In April 2024, during the international auto show in Beijing, the premiere of the first sedan of the Arcfox brand took place, expanding the range with another product from the "Alpha" line with the suffix S5. The car was created as a response to, among others, BYD Seal taking the form of a mid-size sedan. The styling design features aggressively shaped teardrop headlights, a gently sloping roofline, concealed door handles and a light strip at the rear.

The passenger cabin has been redesigned to resemble the αT5 crossover, with a two-spoke steering wheel, no gauges in front of the driver, and all basic vehicle functions concentrated in a large, central 14.6-inch touchscreen. It uses the Huawei multimedia system.

=== 2026 (facelift) ===
Launched in March 2026, the Arcfox αS5 received a facelift featuring a restyled front end. It is now equipped with active grille shutters contributing to a drag coefficient of 0.1925 C_{d}. The infotainment system is now powered by a Qualcomm Snapdragon 8775 SoC with 24GB of RAM and 256GB of storage.

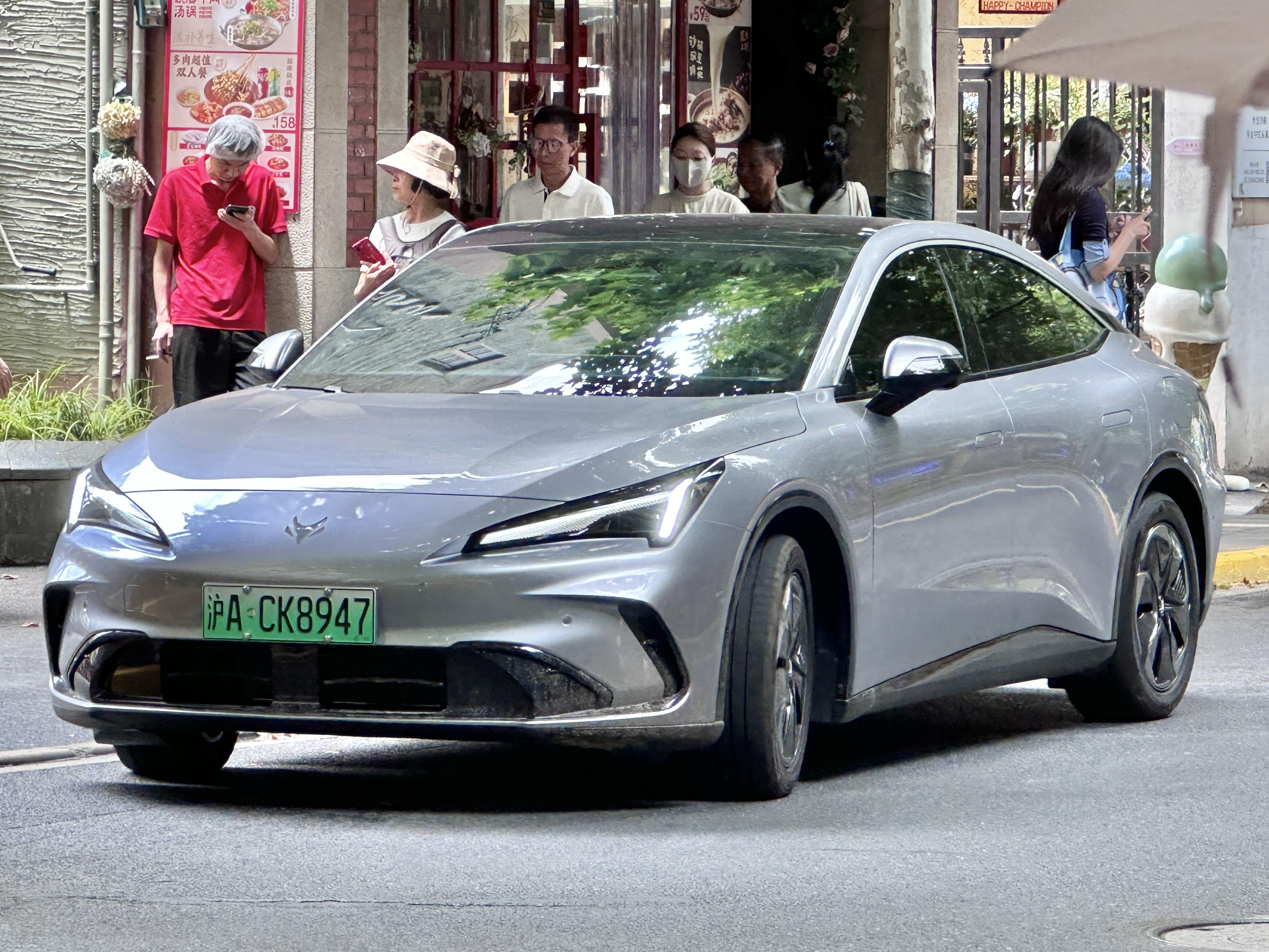
Arcfox αS5 2026 (facelift)

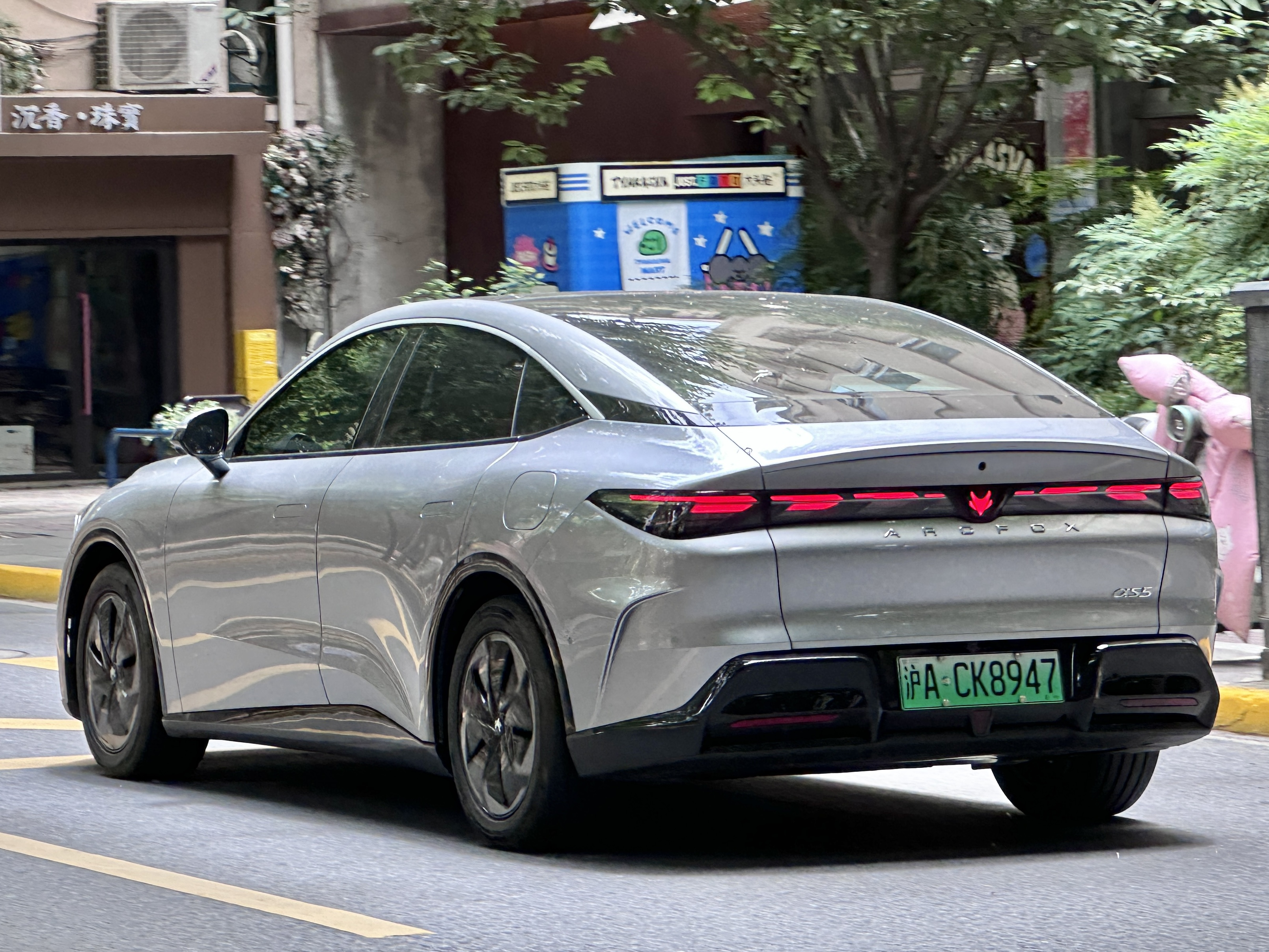
Rear view

=== 2027 update ===
Pre-orders for the 2027 model year update opened on 23 October 2026.

The drivetrain has been reconfigured to be primarily rear-wheel drive, allowing for the addition of a 148-litre (5.2 cu ft) power-opening frunk which can be operated by knocking on the hood. The exterior receives minimal changes the removal of retracting door handles for a flip out design in compliance with new Chinese safety regulations, new Champion Red and Midnight Purple paint colors, and a new sport package featuring frameless mirrors, neon green-painted four-piston brake calipers, and an 3,430 cm^{2} (3.69 sq ft) active rear wing.

Arcfox says the αS5 chassis has 81.6% high-strength steel and aluminium content including the use of 2000 MPa structural reinforcements, resulting in a torsional rigidity of 51,897 N·m/° which Arcfox claims is class leading.

The standard audio system now features 7 speakers, while the upgrade system is 1320-watt 19-speaker with 7.1.4 surround sound.

The ADAS system has been upgraded to the BAIC Yuanjing 4.0 system, which now features a roof-mounted 192-line LiDAR sensor, 3 mmWave radars and 7 cameras, and is powered by the Qualcomm Snapdragon 8775A chip capable of 192TOPS which also powers the cockpit. It is capable of Level 2 supervised autonomous driving in highway and urban conditions and also features multi-story parking structure automated navigation.

The suspension now features continuous damping control with preemptive damping capabilities using LiDAR sensor data.

== Specifications ==
The αS5 is equipped with a fully electric drivetrain with three specifications. The 560Max produces 185 kW (248 hp) and 320 N⋅m (236 ft⋅lb) of torque and has a 64.8 kWh LFP battery capable of charging at up to 160 kW. The 708Max produces 200 kW (268 hp) and 360 N⋅m (266 ft⋅lb) of torque and has a 79.2 kWh NMC battery capable of charging at up to 230 kW. The 650Ultra produces 390 kW (523 hp) and 690 N⋅m (509 ft⋅lb) and has a 74.4 kWh LFP battery capable of charging at up to 404 kW.

The 560Max and 708Max are powered by a single motor electric are two-wheel drive, with the 650Ultra having two motors and is four-wheel drive. With CLTC range being: 560 km (348 mi), 708 km (440 mi), and 650 km (404 mi) respectively.

The range extender powertrain was introduced in March 2026. It uses a 1.5-liter port-injection inline-4 petrol engine with a compression ratio of 14:1 outputting 95 hp (71 kW; 96 PS) at 6,000 rpm and 132 N⋅m (97 lb⋅ft) of torque at 4,500 rpm. It uses a rear motor outputting 268 hp (200 kW; 272 PS) and 365 N⋅m (269 lb⋅ft) of torque, and is equipped with a 27.4 kWh LFP battery supplied by CATL providing 175 km (109 mi) of WLTP electric range, and combined with the 47-liter (12.4 U.S. gal) fuel tank provides a WLTP combined range of 1,220 km (758 mi), or 1,450 km (901 mi) on the CLTC cycle.

For the 2027 model year, the αS5 switches to rear-wheel drive exclusively. The standard model uses a 64.8 kWh LFP pack supplied by CATL capable of charging at up to 100 kW and provides 650 kilometres (404 mi) of CLTC range. Long-range models carry over the 74.4 kWh Shenxing battery pack, which now provides 750 kilometres (466 mi) of CLTC range and which Arcfox says can recharge from 30–80% in 8.9 minutes or replenish 560 km (348 mi) of range within 15 minutes, and retain 92% of its energy at −7 °C (19 °F).

Specifications
Model	Battery		Motor		Power	Torque	Range	DC charging		0–100 km/h (62 mph)	Top speed
Model	Type	Weight	Front	Rear	Power	Torque	CLTC	Peak rate	30–80%	0–100 km/h (62 mph)	Top speed
2024	65 kWh Aurora LFP CATL	481 kg (1,060 lb)	185 kW TZ220XS645 PMSM	—	248 hp (185 kW; 251 PS)	360 N⋅m (266 lb⋅ft)	560 km (348 mi)	160 kW	23 min	7.0 s	180 km/h (112 mph)
2024	79.2 kWh Aurora NMC CATL	470 kg (1,036 lb)	200 kW TZ220XS646 PMSM	—	268 hp (200 kW; 272 PS)	360 N⋅m (266 lb⋅ft)	708 km (440 mi)	230 kW	17 min	6.8 s	180 km/h (112 mph)
2024	79.2 kWh Aurora NMC CATL	470 kg (1,036 lb)	200 kW TZ220XS646 PMSM	190 kW YS220XS560 induction	523 hp (390 kW; 530 PS)	690 N⋅m (509 lb⋅ft)	650 km (404 mi)	230 kW	17 min	3.7 s	180 km/h (112 mph)
2025	64.8 kWh Aurora LFP CATL	476 kg (1,049 lb)	185 kW TZ220XS460 PMSM	—	248 hp (185 kW; 251 PS)	320 N⋅m (236 lb⋅ft)	560 km (348 mi)	160 kW	23 min	7.0 s	180 km/h (112 mph)
2025	74.4 kWh Shenxing LFP CATL	552 kg (1,217 lb)	200 kW TZ220XS646 PMSM	—	268 hp (200 kW; 272 PS)	360 N⋅m (266 lb⋅ft)	668 km (415 mi)	404 kW	9 min	6.8 s	180 km/h (112 mph)
2025	74.4 kWh Shenxing LFP CATL	552 kg (1,217 lb)	200 kW TZ220XS646 PMSM	190 kW YS220XS560 induction	523 hp (390 kW; 530 PS)	690 N⋅m (509 lb⋅ft)	630 km (391 mi)	404 kW	9 min	3.7 s	180 km/h (112 mph)
2025	79.2 kWh Aurora NMC CATL	470 kg (1,036 lb)	200 kW TZ220XS646 PMSM	—	268 hp (200 kW; 272 PS)	360 N⋅m (266 lb⋅ft)	708 km (440 mi)	230 kW	17 min	6.8 s	180 km/h (112 mph)
2026 (EREV)	27.4 kWh Aurora LFP CATL	230 kg (507 lb)	—	200 kW TZ220XS504 PMSM	268 hp (200 kW; 272 PS)	365 N⋅m (269 lb⋅ft)	230 km (143 mi)		15 min	6.5 s	180 km/h (112 mph)
2026	64.8 kWh Aurora LFP CATL	476 kg (1,049 lb)	185 kW TZ220XS460 PMSM	—	248 hp (185 kW; 251 PS)	320 N⋅m (236 lb⋅ft)	630 km (391 mi)	215 kW	15 min	7.0 s	190 km/h (118 mph)
2026	74.4 kWh Shenxing LFP CATL	552 kg (1,217 lb)	200 kW TZ220XS646 PMSM	—	268 hp (200 kW; 272 PS)	360 N⋅m (266 lb⋅ft)	720 km (447 mi)	404 kW	9 min	6.8 s	180 km/h (112 mph)
2026	74.4 kWh Shenxing LFP CATL	552 kg (1,217 lb)	200 kW TZ220XS646 PMSM	190 kW YS220XS560 induction	523 hp (390 kW; 530 PS)	690 N⋅m (509 lb⋅ft)	650 km (404 mi)	404 kW	9 min	3.7 s	180 km/h (112 mph)
2027	64.8 kWh Aurora LFP CATL	476 kg (1,049 lb)	—	200 kW TZ220XY428 PMSM	268 hp (200 kW; 272 PS)	315 N⋅m (232 lb⋅ft)	650 km (404 mi)	100 kW	22 min	6.5 s	175 km/h (109 mph)
2027	74.4 kWh Shenxing LFP CATL	552 kg (1,217 lb)	—	227 kW TZ220XY410 PMSM	304 hp (227 kW; 308 PS)	315 N⋅m (232 lb⋅ft)	750 km (466 mi)	404 kW	9 min	5.9 s	180 km/h (112 mph)

== Sales ==
Year	China
2024	21,712
2025	31,449
