= American Motorcyclist Association =

Nonprofit organization

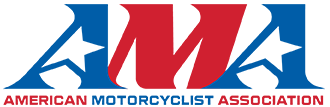
- Sport: Motorsport
- Jurisdiction: USA
- Abbreviation: AMA
- Founded: 1924; 102 years ago
- Affiliation: Fédération Internationale de Motocyclisme
- Regional affiliation: FIM North America
- Headquarters: Pickerington, Ohio, U.S.
- Chairman: Rob Dingman

Official website
- www.americanmotorcyclist.com

The American Motorcyclist Association (AMA) is an American nonprofit organization of more than 200,000 motorcyclists that organizes numerous motorcycling activities and campaigns for motorcyclists' legal rights. Its mission statement is "to promote the motorcycling lifestyle and protect the future of motorcycling." The organization was founded in 1924 and, as of October 2016, had more than 1,100 chartered clubs.

It provides guidance and advice on running events and rallies for clubs and promoters, and allows affiliated members to vote on AMA matters. It also has a corporate membership category with representatives from the US motorcycle industry.

The AMA is the official national federation representative (FMN) for the United States of America in the Fédération Internationale de Motocyclisme (FIM) and organizes US teams and riders for FIM-sanctioned events, including the International Six Day Enduro, Motocross Des Nations, and Trials Des Nations.

== History ==
The AMA was a whites-only organization from its inception in 1924 until the 1950s, not allowing African Americans or any other minority group to join for its first 30 years. A 1930 AMA membership application form, on display at the Harley-Davidson Museum, included the statement "membership is limited to white persons only". This segregation occurred at a time in American history when many motorcycle dealerships refused to sell motorcycles to black riders, forcing an entire population to create their own culture. The museum exhibit has examples of distinctive uniforms worn by motorcycle clubs, both AMA sanctioned and those from the separate culture of black or racially desegregated clubs that proliferated as a consequence of the AMA segregation policy, such as the Berkeley Tigers MC from the San Francisco Bay Area.

Before the acceptance of black members, the term outlaw motorcycle club could refer to either a white counterculture biker club that was "uninterested in 'square' events and competitions", or else a club that accepted non-white members and was therefore not allowed to participate in the AMA. In the 1920s and 1930s, black hillclimbing racer William B. Johnson evaded the whites-only restriction and obtained an AMA membership card, which allowed him to compete around the Northeastern United States and become perhaps the first black AMA member.

After the racial policy was abolished, AMA-sanctioned motorcycle clubs thrived in the post-World War II era, when motorcycle sales soared, and club membership appealed to "better-adjusted" American veterans who enjoyed group participation and operated under strict bylaws governing club meetings and riding events.

In 1995, AMA President Ed Youngblood said that as a consequence of this racial policy from 1924 to the 1950s, blacks continued to be underrepresented in AMA events for decades after the segregationist policy was rescinded. That year, Youngblood presented black AMA member Norman Gaines in their membership advertisement in the campaign "I want to protect my rights as a motorcyclist. That's why I'm an AMA member" in both the AMA member magazine and Motorcyclist magazine.

== Outlaw and one-percenter ==
The term one-percenter was coined after the 1947 Hollister riot in Hollister, California. The AMA reportedly responded that 99% of motorcyclists were law-abiding citizens, implying that the remaining 1% were outlaws. The AMA now says they have no record of such a statement to the press and calls the story apocryphal. One-percenter motorcycle clubs are often also known as outlaw motorcycle gangs or OMGs according to the US Bureau of Alcohol, Tobacco, Firearms and Explosives.

== Competitions ==
The AMA sanctions over 2,000 events each year hosted by chartered clubs and promoters across the country in the disciplines of Motocross, Off-Road, and Track Racing. Each discipline is guided by the AMA Racing Rule Book, which is organized, written, and voted on each year by the AMA Congress, composed of AMA delegates from across the country representing their areas, disciplines, and districts. In addition to a yearly congress, the AMA also organizes the AMA National Awards Banquet that awards championships to all of the AMA Amateur National championships from across the country, in addition to naming the AMA Racer of the Year, AMA Youth Racer of the Year, AMA Women's Racer of the Year, AMA Club of the Year, and more. The AMA Board of Directors annually presents non-competition awards to those who carry on the AMA mission. Those awards include the AMA Dud Perkins Lifetime Achievement Award, the AMA Bessie Stringfield Award, the AMA Hazel Kolb Brighter Image Award, and the Jim Viverito Friend of the AMA Award.

AMA Championship Competition

- MotoAmerica
  - AMA Superbike Championship
  - AMA Supersport Championship
  - AMA King of the Baggers
  - AMA Super Hooligan
  - AMA Stock 1000
  - AMA Talent Cup
  - AMA Twins Cup
  - AMA Mini Cup
- Endurance Racing
  - AMA EnduroCross Championship
  - AMA National Enduro Championship Series
  - AMA US Sprint Enduro Championship Series
  - AMA Florida Enduro Championship Series
- Speedway Racing
  - American Flat Track
  - AMA National Speedway Championship
  - AMA Vintage Flat Track National Championship Series
- Moto Trails
  - AMA Vintage Trials Grand Championship
  - AMA/NATC East MotoTrials Championship Series
  - AMA/NATC East Youth/Women’s Trials Championship
  - AMA/NATC West MotoTrials Championship Series
  - AMA/NATC West Youth/Women’s Trials Championships
  - Bonneville Motorcycle Speed Trials AMA National and FIM World Records
  - NATC Trials Championship
- Off-roading and Hill Climb
  - AMA American Hillclimb
  - AMA Arizona Off-Road State Championship Series
  - AMA Cal Classic
  - AMA East Hare Scrambles Championship Series
  - AMA National Hare and Hound
  - AMA Pioneer Motorcycle Club
  - AMA Vintage Hare Scrambles
  - AMA West Hare Scrambles Championship Series
  - Grand National Cross Country
  - Grassroots Off Road Series
  - J Day Off Road
  - NGPC Racing
- Arena cross
  - AMA GT Arenacross Championship
  - AMA North America Arenacross Championship
  - AMA Partzilla Regional Arenacross Series
- Motocross
  - AMA Motocross Championship
  - AMA Amateur National Motocross
  - AMA District 14 Motocross
  - AMA RMX Championship Series
  - AMA Moto86 Series
- Supercross
  - AMA Supercross Championship
  - SuperMotocross World Championship
- Ice Racing
  - AMA Ice Race Grand Championship – GP
  - AMA Ice Race Grand Championship – Oval
- ATV Racing
  - ATV MotoCross Championship
  - GNCC ATV Racing

=== AMA Pro Racing ===
AMA Pro Racing was formed in 1994 to respond to the growth of motorcycle racing in the United States and holds many events. The AMA is the largest motorsports organization in the world, overseeing 80 professional and more than 4,000 amateur events each year. The AMA also maintains the Motorcycle Hall of Fame located near Columbus, Ohio. It is the designated governing body of motorcycle sport in the US, as designated by the world governing body, the Fédération Internationale de Motocyclisme (FIM).

On March 7, 2008, the AMA Pro Racing series was sold to the Daytona Motorsports Group (DMG), headed by Roger Edmondson and Jim France. The DMG became responsible for the AMA Superbike Series, AMA Motocross Series, AMA Flat Track Series, AMA Supermoto Series, AMA Hillclimb Series, and ATV Pro Racing. The sale did not include the AMA Supercross and AMA Arenacross Series, whose rights are currently owned by Feld Entertainment. DMG would license the AMA name and trademarks to promote the motorcycle racing series. The new management sparked criticism among some of the press and fans for allegedly alienating the factory teams and for introducing NASCAR style rules such as rolling start and pace car. DMG was replaced by MotoAmerica as AMA Superbikes promoter in 2015.

== American Motorcyclist ==
American Motorcyclist magazine is published by the AMA. It has a monthly circulation of 260,000 copies.

== See also ==
- Motorcycling advocacy
- ABATE
- Antique Motorcycle Club of America
- British Motorcyclists Federation
- Federation of European Motorcyclists Associations
- Helmet Law Defense League
- Outlaw motorcycle club
