= British Motorcyclists Federation =

- Abbreviation: BMF
- Founded: 1960
- Founded at: London,
- Type: NGO
- Purpose: Riders' rights group
- Region served: UK
- Members: 53,000 members
- Chairman: Jim Freeman
- Key people: Anna Zee
- Website: www.britishmotorcyclists.co.uk

The British Motorcyclists Federation (BMF) is a motorcycle riders' rights group in the United Kingdom. The BMF was founded in 1960 as the Federation of National One Make Motorcycle Clubs to counter accusations of "leather-jacketed hooligans". It renamed itself the BMF in 1965. The group lobbies for motorcyclists' interests at local, national and European levels.

== Activities ==
The BMF represents responsible motorcycle riders in the UK. About 260 motorcycle clubs are affiliated to the BMF, giving it more than 6,500 full and 53,000 affiliated members. It campaigns at local, regional, national levels within the UK, and within the European Union through its membership of the Federation of European Motorcyclists Associations. It also has representation at the Fédération Internationale de Motocyclisme.

It provides a complete range of motorcycle training, from Compulsory Basic Training for beginners up to its Blue Riband advanced rider training and training to become a professional motorcycle instructor. The BMF gives advice on a wide range of issues from security to an online road defect reporting system. Other member services include insurance and information that covers motorcycle touring.

It also supports numerous motorcycle events held in support of many charities. The BMF's North West Region supports disabled motorcyclists through its sponsorship of a marquee at the National Association for Bikers with a Disability charity's annual You've Been NABBED rally.

It also publishes the magazine Motorcycle Rider.

== Intermediate and advanced motorcycle training ==
The BMF provides two levels of training for riders who already possess a full motorcycle licence. For less experienced riders, the BMF Rider Plus programme provides extra skills in machine handling, cornering and avoiding accidents.

For more experienced riders, the BMF Blue Riband rider award is an advanced riding course to enhance handling skills, cornering and overtaking - while reducing accident risk.

In both cases - unlike the Institute of Advanced Motorists and Royal Society for the Prevention of Accidents - the BMF provides training through professional instructors not volunteer observers.

== See also ==
- Motorcycling
- Motorcycling advocacy
- ABATE
- American Motorcyclist Association
- Federation of European Motorcyclists Associations
- Helmet Law Defense League (HLDL)
