= Hongqi G919 =

Range-extended full-size luxury SUV

Overview
- Manufacturer: FAW Group
- Model code: P567
- Production: 2026–present
- Assembly: China: Changchun, Jilin

Body and chassis
- Class: Full-size luxury SUV (F)
- Body style: 5-door SUV
- Layout: Front-engine, quad-motor, all-wheel-drive
- Chassis: Body-on-frame CA2040H6REEVTX

Powertrain
- Engine: Gasoline range extender: 2.0 L CA4GC20TDH-43 turbo I4
- Electric motor: 4×155 kW CAM220PT24 PMSM
- Power output: 831 hp (620 kW; 843 PS)
- Hybrid drivetrain: Series (EREV)
- Battery: 64.1 kWh NMC Eve Energy
- Range: 1,350 km (839 mi) (CLTC)
- Electric range: 220 km (137 mi) (WLTP); 280 km (174 mi) (CLTC)
- Plug-in charging: DC: 30–80%: 12 minutes

Dimensions
- Wheelbase: 2,900 mm (114.2 in)
- Length: 5,135 mm (202.2 in)
- Width: 2,050 mm (80.7 in)
- Height: 1,950 mm (76.8 in)
- Curb weight: 3,150–3,175 kg (6,945–7,000 lb)

The Hongqi G919 (Chinese: 红旗G919) is a range-extended full-size luxury SUV produced by the FAW Group. It is the first off-road vehicle from the Hongqi marque.

== History ==
The G919 was previewed by an off-road concept vehicle shown at the Shanghai Auto Show on 23 April 2025. At the same time, a naming contest was announced where the winner would receive a free car if they won.

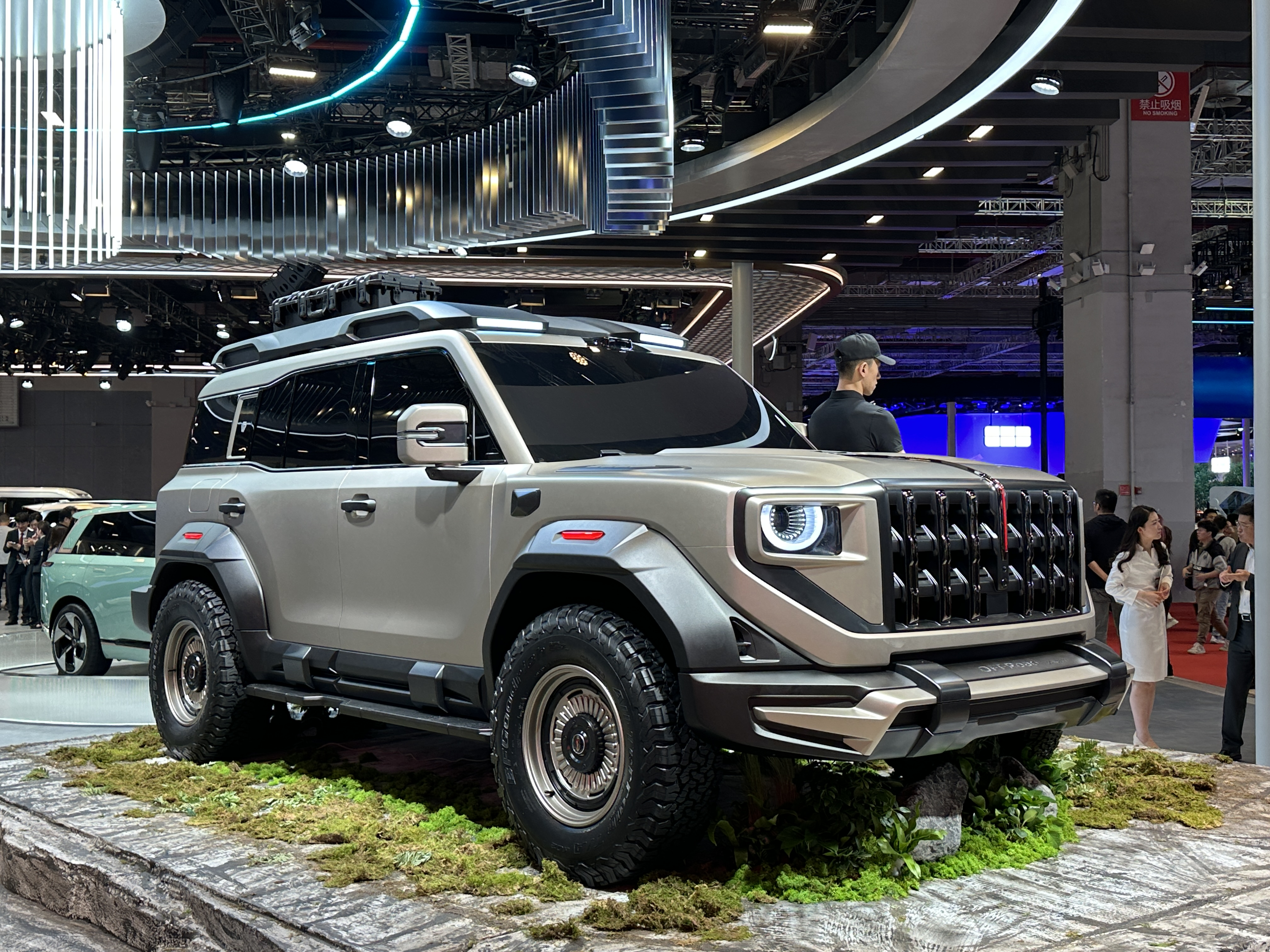
Hongqi Off-Road Concept

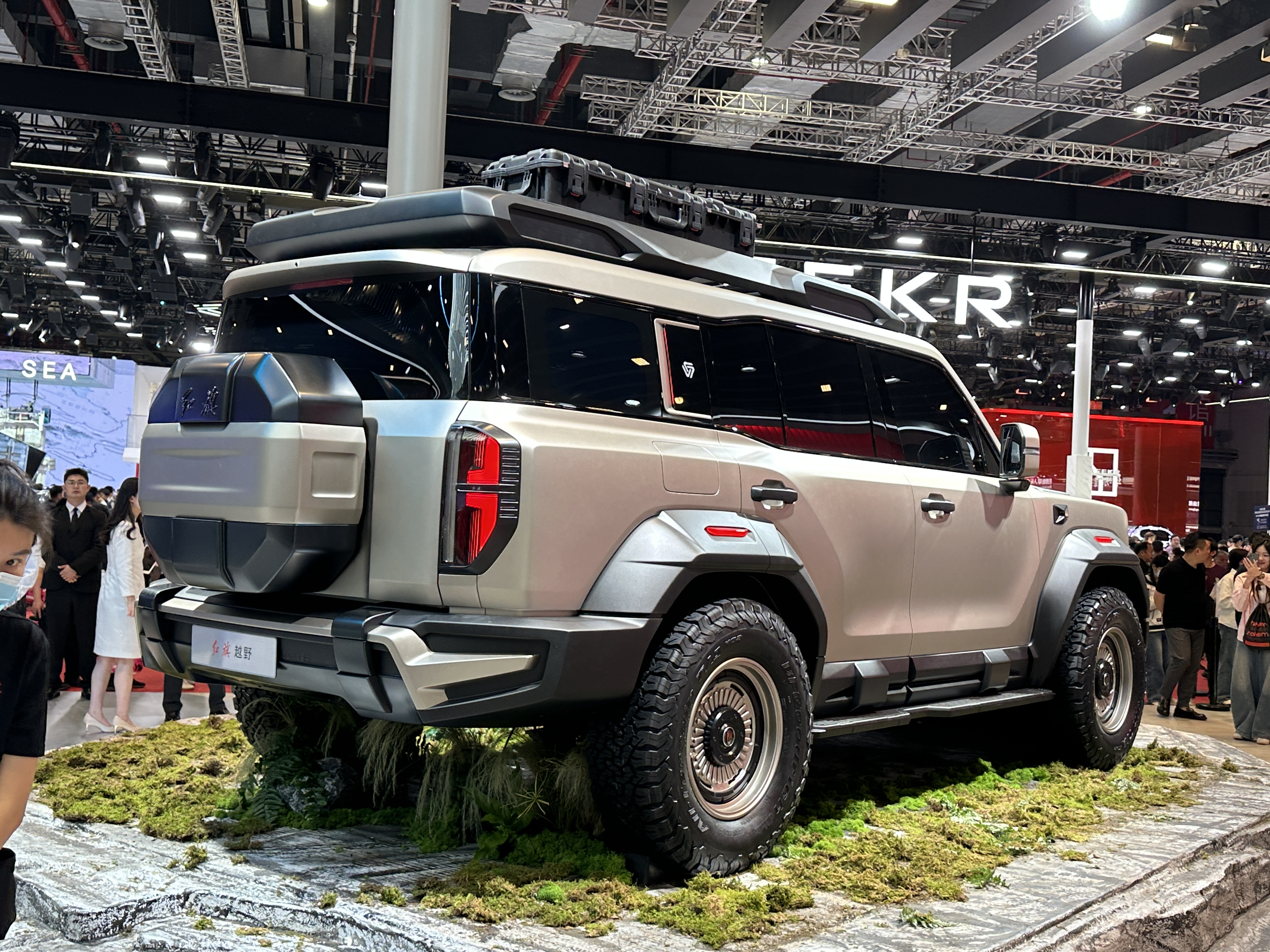
Rear view

The official name of the G919 was originally planned to be unveiled at 2025 Auto Guangzhou. The naming contest had at least 310,000 participants and 67,245 names were submitted for the contest. From the contest, 10 names of the 67,245 were selected between October 8 and October 31.

On February 18, 2026, the first spyshots of the G919 surfaced on the internet.

It was confirmed on April 15, 2026, that the off-road would make its official debut at 2026 Auto China in Beijing.

Its name was revealed on 7 June 2026, as the Hongqi G919.

Pre-orders for the G919 opened on 22 September 2026, and it went on sale a month later on 25 October.

== Overview ==
The exterior uses a theme based on the mortise and tenon woodworking technique. The headlights were designed to resemble the human eye structure and are pair with a geometrical grille and the marque's signature red strip used at the front of their vehicles. It uses a blocky shape used by most off-road SUVs.

Rear view

Interior

=== Features ===
The G919 uses body-on-frame construction and has double wishbone suspension geometry front and rear, with optional dual-chamber air suspension. Hongqi says the frame has a torsional stiffness of up to 9,500N·m/°, which consists of over 90% high-strength and ultra high-strength steel, while the body consists of 84.4% high-strength steel. It has approach, departure, and breakover angles of 30°, 32°, and 20°, respectively, 220 mm (8.7 in) ground clearance or up to 290 mm (11.4 in) with air suspension, and maximum wading depth of 900 mm (35.4 in) when equipped with optional wading depth sensors.

The exterior features 20 accessory mounting points for equipment such as winches, air pumps, roof baskets, and side tents. The rear cargo area has a side-hinged tailgate and measures 950 litres (33.5 cu ft), expanding to 2,120 litres (74.9 cu ft) with the rear seats folded down.

A LiDAR sensor is present on the roof of the G919, alongside a camera that is mounted on the left front fender. Traditional door handles are used. The G919 will also come with a roof rack and a rear-mounted spare tire. The interior uses a three-spoke steering wheel, , an electronic column shifter, 12.3-inch digital instrument panel, 17.3-inch 3K-resolution center infotainment touchscreen, an electronic column shifter, and a 17.3-inch 3K-resolution rear entertainment display, all powered by a Qualcomm Snapdragon 8295P SoC. It is equipped with an 18-speaker Dynaudio sound system, dual active-cooled 50-watt wireless charging pads, 7.3-litre (0.26 cu ft) refrigerator, and rear seatback tables. The front seats have heating, ventilation, and 8-point massage functions, along with active side bolsters and 3 levels of cushion firmness adustment, and the front passenger seat also gets a power legrest. The rear seats have heating and ventilation functions and can recline up to 131°.

It is equipped with an infrared vision system with 220 m (720 ft) pedestrian detection and the Sinan 5.0 Max ADAS system, with a sensor suite consisting of one 384-line variable-angle roof-mounted LiDAR, 1 mmWave radar, 11 cameras, and 12 ultrasonic sensors, powered by a Qualcomm Snapdragon 8650 dedicated ADAS chip and is capable supervised autonomous driving in highway and urban conditions.

== Powertrain ==
The G919 is available exclusively as a range-extender with a quad-motor individual wheel drive layout using 800-volt class power electronics. It is equipped with a 2.0-liter turbocharged gasoline range extender outputting 208 hp (155 kW; 211 PS) (214 hp (160 kW; 217 PS) gross) and 340 N⋅m (251 lb⋅ft) of torque. It is equipped with four permanent magnet synchronous motors each outputting 208 hp (155 kW; 211 PS) and 330 N⋅m (243 lb⋅ft) of torque, for a total of 832 hp (620 kW; 844 PS) and 1,320 N⋅m (974 lb⋅ft) of torque. It has a has a claimed 0–100 km/h (62 mph) time of 4.5 seconds and a top speed of 180 km/h (112 mph).

It is equipped with a 62.9 kWh (64.1 kWh gross capacity) NMC battery pack and is the first to use Eve Energy's latest generation of 'ICON' large 46 mm-diameter cylindrical-format cells. It provides 220 kilometres (137 mi) of pure electric WLTP range and is capable of recharging from 30–80% in 12 minutes.

Hongqi says that the G919 has a total wheel torque of 18,500 N⋅m (13,600 lb⋅ft) and a half-shaft fracture torque rating of 11,500 N⋅m (8,500 lb⋅ft). It is equipped with a standard locking rear differential, optional locking front differential, and virtual locking center differential, and wheel torque on one axle can reach up to 12,600 N⋅m (9,300 lb⋅ft) when the differential is locked. It is also equipped with an electronic torque vectoring system capable of reducing the turning radius to 5.3 metres (17.4 ft), or as low as 2.5 metres (8.2 ft) with the tank turn mode.

Specifications
Battery		Engine	Power	Torque	Electric range		30–80% charge	0–100 km/h (62 mph)
Type	Weight	Engine	Power	Torque	WLTP	CLTC	30–80% charge	0–100 km/h (62 mph)
64.1 (62.9) kWh NMC Eve Energy	353 kg (778 lb)	208 hp (155 kW; 211 PS)	832 hp (620 kW; 844 PS)	1,320 N⋅m (974 lb⋅ft)	220 km (137 mi)	280 km (174 mi)	12 min	4.5 sec
