= Daytime running lamp =

Vehicle lights

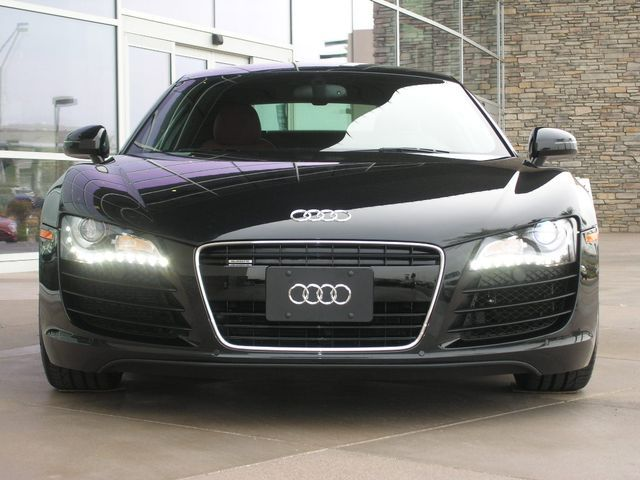
LED DRLs on a First Gen. Audi R8

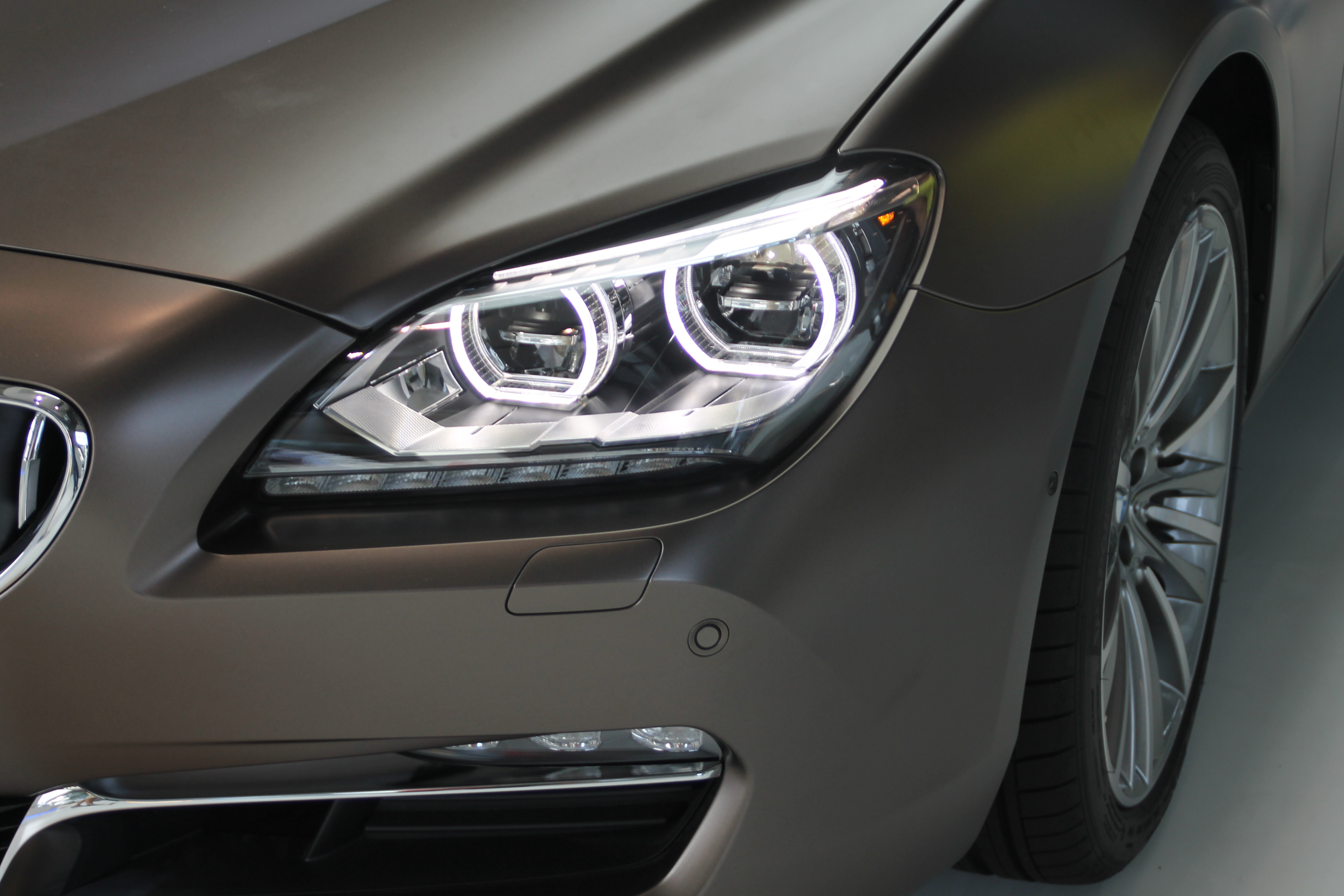
LED DRLs on a BMW 6 Series Gran Coupe (F06)

A daytime running lamp (DRL), also known as daytime running light, is an automotive lighting and bicycle lighting device on the front of a road going motor vehicle or bicycle. It is automatically switched on when the vehicle's handbrake has been released, when the vehicle is in gear, or when the engine is started, emitting white, yellow, or amber light. Their intended use is not to help the driver see the road or their surroundings, but to help other road users identify an active vehicle.

== Implementations ==
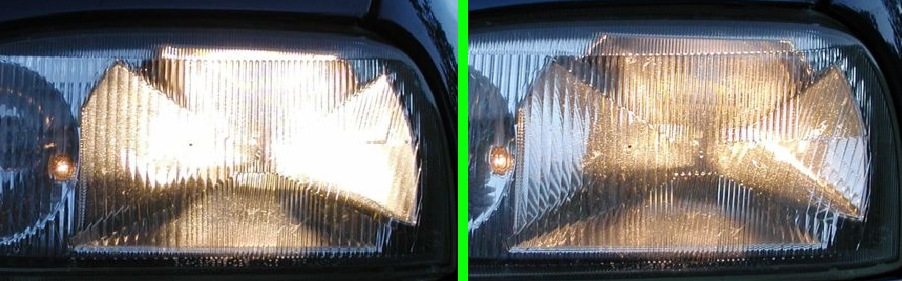
Full-voltage vs. parking light headlamp on European-market Volkswagen, 2007

Depending on prevailing regulations and equipment, vehicles may implement the daytime-running light function by functionally turning on specific lamps, by operating low-beam headlamps or fog lamps at full or reduced intensity, by operating high-beam headlamps at reduced intensity, or by steady-burning operation of the front turn signals. Compared to any mode of headlamp operation to produce the daytime running light, functionally dedicated DRLs maximize the potential benefits in safety performance, glare, motorcycle masking, and other potential drawbacks.

== Usage ==
A daytime running lamp is usually automatically switched on once the ignition is on; other vehicles may switch the daytime running lamps on when the parking brake is released or when the vehicle is shifted into gear. A daytime running lamp emits a brighter light when the headlamps are not turned on and its brightness will be dimmed slightly in conjunction with the headlamps being turned on.

== Safety performance ==
A 2008 study by the US National Highway Traffic Safety Administration analysed the effect of DRLs on frontal and side-on crashes between two vehicles and on vehicle collisions with pedestrians, cyclists, and motorcyclists. The analysis determined that DRLs offer no statistically significant reduction in the frequency or severity of the collisions studied, except for a reduction in light trucks' and vans' involvement in two-vehicle crashes by a statistically significant 5.7%.

=== Effect of ambient light ===
The daytime running light was first mandated, and safety benefits first perceived, in Scandinavian countries where it is persistently dark during the winter season. As ambient light levels increase, the potential safety benefit decreases while the DRL intensity required for a safety improvement increases. The safety benefit produced by DRLs in relatively dark Nordic countries is roughly triple the benefit observed in the relatively bright United States.

=== Effect on motorcycle safety ===
A number of motorcycling advocacy groups are concerned over reduced motorcycle conspicuousness and increased vulnerability with the introduction of headlamp-based DRLs on cars and other dual-track vehicles, since it means motorcycles are no longer the only vehicles displaying headlamps during the day. Some researchers have suggested that amber DRLs be reserved for use exclusively on motorcycles, in countries where amber is not presently a permissible color for DRLs on any vehicles, while other research has concluded there is a safety disadvantage to two 90 mm (3 1/2 in) × 520-candela DRLs on motorcycles in comparison to one 190 mm (7 1/2 in) × 270-candela dipped (low) beam headlight. The latter result suggests that a daytime running lamp's luminous area may have an important influence on its effectiveness.

== Environmental impact ==
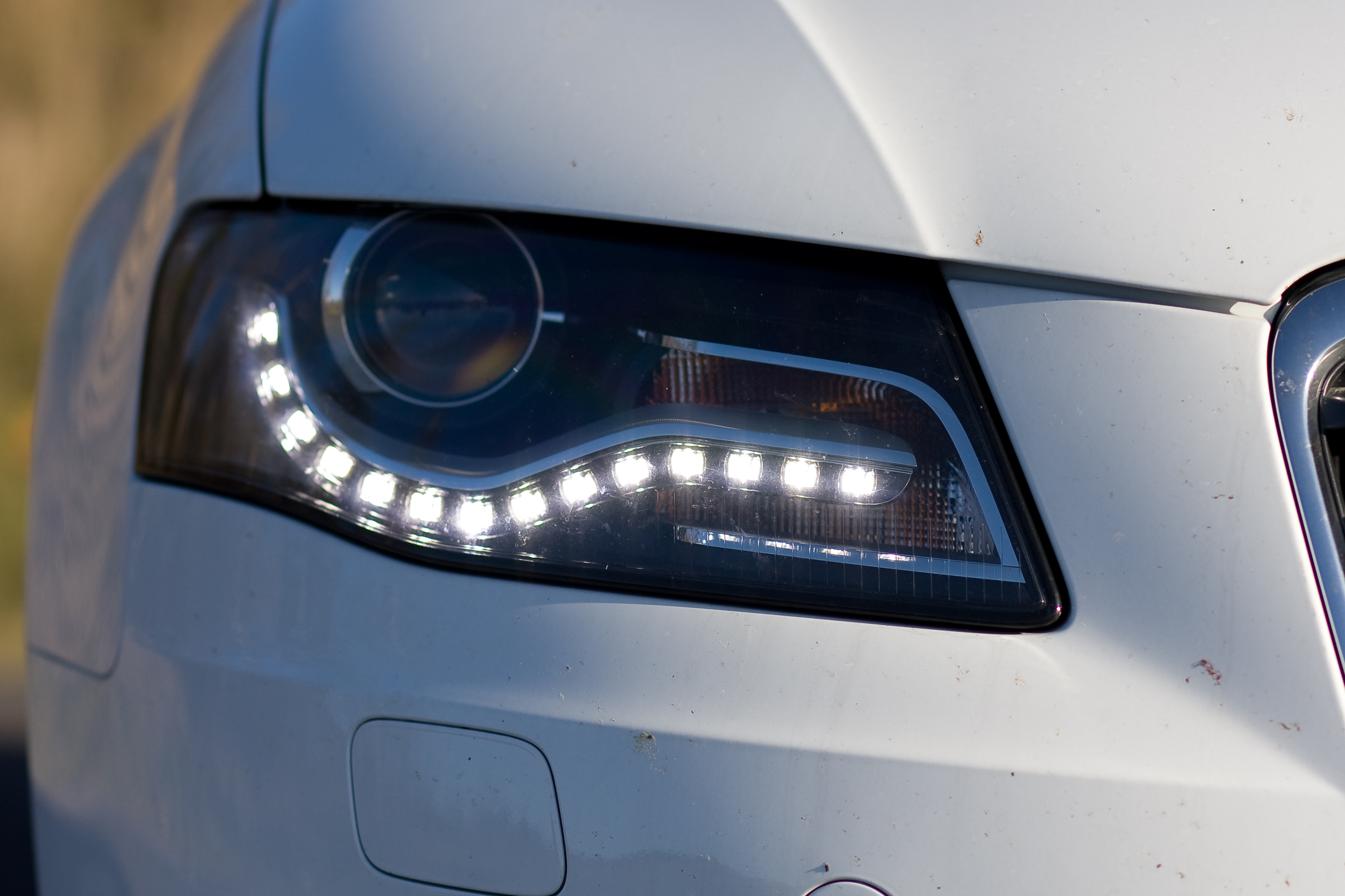
LED daytime running lights on Audi A4

DRL power consumption varies widely depending on the implementation. Current production DRL systems consume from 5 W (dedicated LED system) to over 200 W (headlamps and all parking, tail, and marker lights on). International regulators, primarily in Europe, are working to balance the potential safety benefit offered by DRL with the increased fuel consumption due to their use.

Because the power to run the DRLs must be produced by the engine, which in turn requires burning additional fuel, high-power DRL systems increase CO_{2} emissions sufficiently to affect a country's compliance with the Kyoto Protocol on greenhouse gas emissions. For that reason, low-power solutions are being encouraged and headlamp-based systems are not allowed after DRLs became mandatory in Europe at the beginning of 2011.

LEDs and low-power, high-efficacy, long-life light bulbs produce appropriate amounts of light for an effective DRL without significantly increasing fuel consumption or emissions. Fuel economy increases of up to 0.2 km/L (0.5 mpg_{‑US}; 0.6 mpg_{‑imp}) may be found when comparing a 55-watt DRL system to a 200-watt DRL system. In 2006, the UK's Department of Transport also found significant reductions in emissions and fuel consumption when comparing a 42-watt DRL system to a 160-watt full headlight DRL systems. DRL fuel consumption can be reduced to insignificant levels by the use of 8-to-20-watt DRL systems based on LEDs or high-efficiency filament bulbs.

== Worldwide ==
=== Europe ===
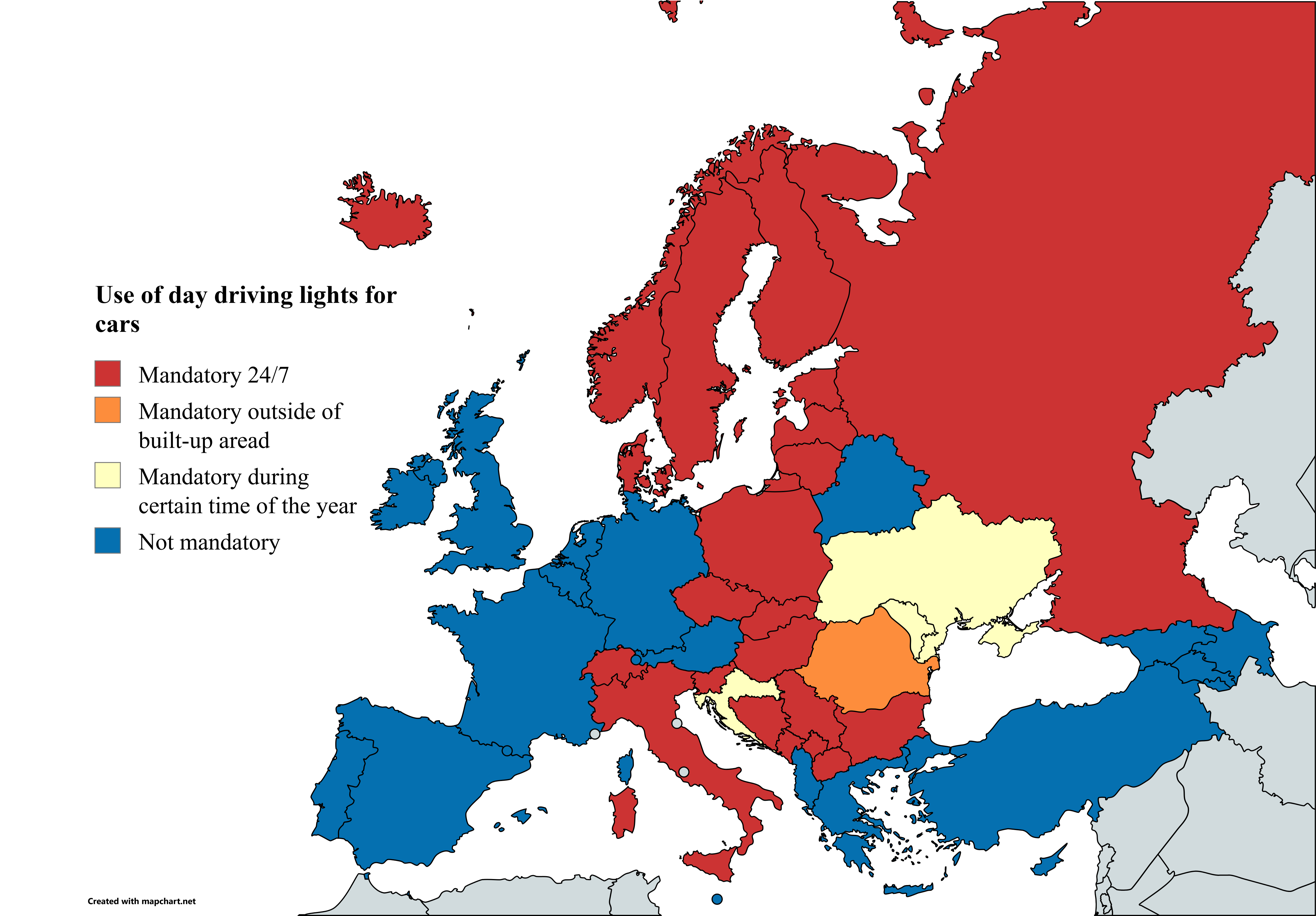
Use of day driving lights for cars in Europe

==== European Union ====
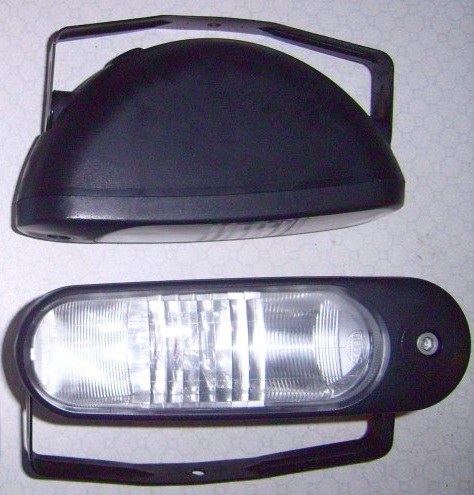
Hella 6-watt halogen-bulb DRLs for retrofit. Other retrofit DRLs use LEDs

European Union Directive 2008/89/EC required all passenger cars and small delivery vans first type approved on or after 7 February 2011 in the EU to come equipped with daytime running lights. European Union Directive 2008/89/EC ended validity on 31 October 2014, implicitly repealed by the replacement Regulation (EC) No 661/2009. which was replaced by Directive 2019/2144. The mandate was extended to trucks and buses in August 2012. Unlike Northern European countries, the European Union does not include the taillights in the requirement.

Using headlamps or front turn signals or fog lamps as DRLs is not permitted; the EU Directive requires functionally specific daytime running lamps compliant with ECE Regulation 87 and mounted to the vehicle in accordance with ECE Regulation 48. DRLs compliant with R87 emit white light on an axis of between 400 and 1,200 candela with an apparent surface of 25 to 200 cm^{2} (4 to 31 sq in) with an additional requirement of between 1 and 1,200 candela in a defined field.

In the past, Germany, Spain, France and other European countries have encouraged or required daytime use of low beam headlamps on certain roads at certain times of year; Ireland encourages the use of low beam headlights during the winter, Italy and Hungary require daytime running lamps outside populated areas, and Bulgaria, Czech Republic, Estonia, Kosovo, Latvia, Lithuania, North Macedonia, Montenegro, Poland, Romania, Serbia, Slovakia and Slovenia require the use of full or reduced voltage low beam headlights at all times. Whether this requirement is met by the DRLs required on new cars since February 2011 is a matter of individual countries' laws.

==== Nordic countries ====
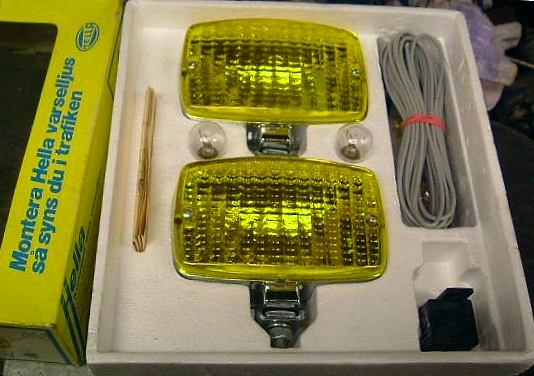
Hella DRL retrofit kit in selective yellow offered in Sweden in the 1970s. Package text reads "Install Hella perception lights so you are seen in traffic".

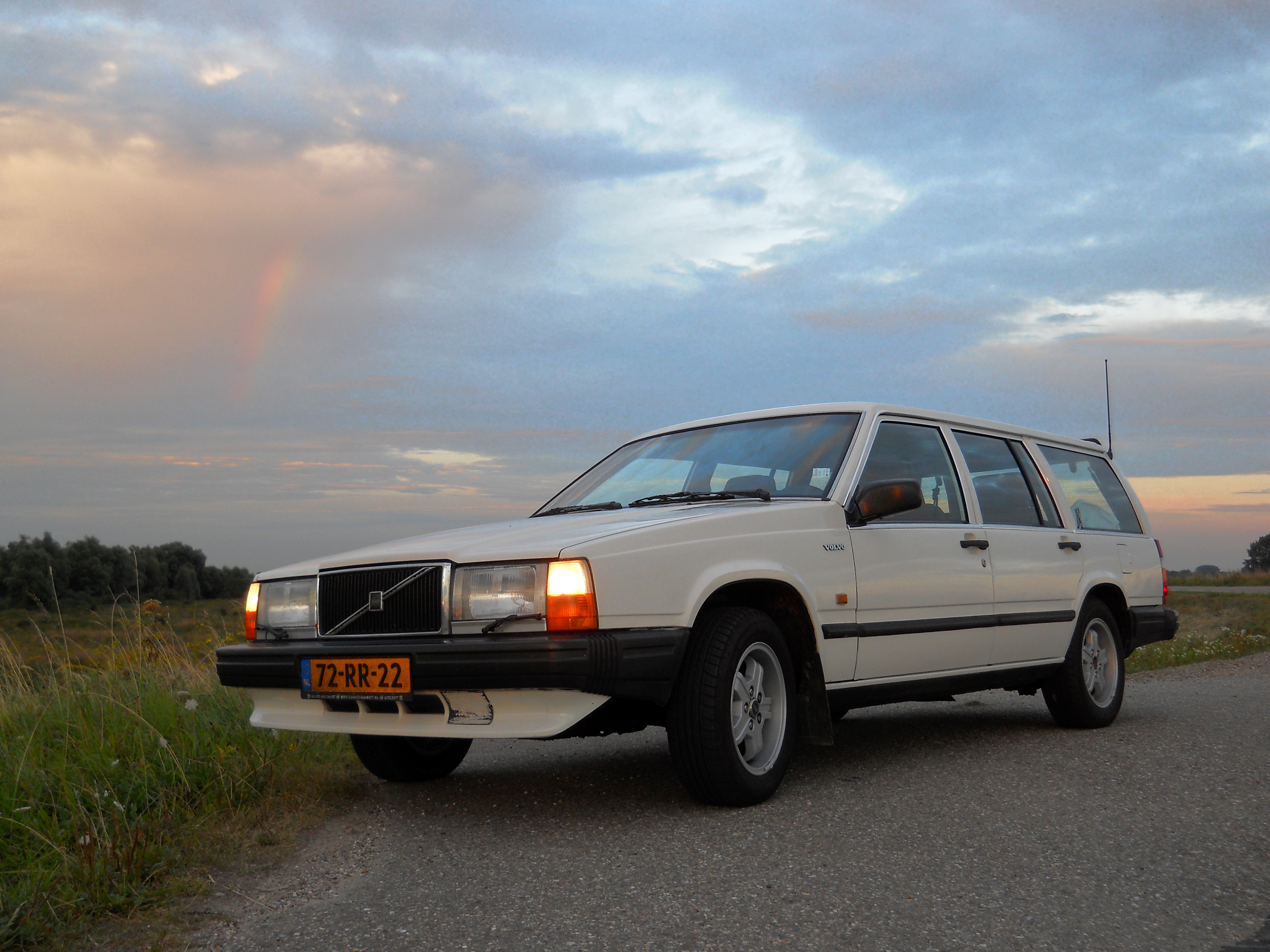
Early type of DRL as used by Volvo and Saab on Nordic markets in the 1970s and 1980s: Bright filaments were mounted in the front parking lamps as "perception light"

DRLs were first mandated in the Nordic countries, where ambient light levels in the winter are generally low even during the day. Sweden was the first country to require widespread DRLs in October 1977. At the time, the function was known as varselljus ("perception light" or "notice light"). The initial regulations in these countries favored devices incorporating 21-watt signal bulbs identical to those used in brake lamps and turn signals, producing yellow or white light of approximately 400 to 600 candela on a axis, mounted at the outer left and right edges of the front of the vehicle.

Finland adopted a daytime-light requirement in 1972 on rural roads in wintertime, and in 1982 on rural roads in summertime and 1997 on all roads all year long; Norway in 1985, Iceland in 1988, and Denmark in 1990. To increase manufacturer flexibility in complying with the requirement for DRLs, the daytime illumination of low beam headlights was added as an optional implementation. Given the headlamp specifications in use in those countries, such an implementation would produce approximately 450 candela axially.

==== United Kingdom ====
UK regulations briefly required vehicles first used on or after 1 April 1987 to be equipped with a dim-dip device or functionally dedicated daytime running lamps, except those vehicles type-approved to ECE Regulation 48 regarding installation of lighting equipment—this exception was made because ECE R48 did not require dim-dip or daytime running lights, and while countries signatory to the ECE Regulations are permitted to maintain their own national regulations as an option to the ECE regulations, they are not permitted to bar vehicles approved under the ECE regulations. The dim-dip system operated the low beam headlamps (called "dipped beam" in the UK) at between 10% and 20% of normal low beam intensity. The running lamps permitted as an alternative to dim-dip were required to emit at least 200 candela straight ahead, and no more than 800 candela in any direction. In practice, most vehicles were equipped with the dim-dip option rather than the running lamps.

The dim-dip lights were not intended for use as daytime running lights. Rather, they operated when the engine was running and the driver switched on the front position (parking) lamps. Dim-dip was intended to provide a nighttime "town beam" with intensity between that of the parking lamps commonly used at the time by British drivers in city traffic after dark, and low beam headlamps; the former were considered insufficiently intense to provide improved conspicuity in conditions requiring it, while the latter were considered too glaring for safe use in built-up areas. The UK was the only country to require such dim-dip systems, though vehicles so equipped were sold in other Commonwealth countries with left-hand traffic.

In 1988, the European Commission successfully prosecuted the UK government in the European Court of Justice, arguing that the UK requirement for dim-dip was illegal under EC directives prohibiting member states from enacting vehicle lighting requirements not contained in pan-European EC directives. As a result, the UK requirement for dim-dip was quashed. Nevertheless, dim-dip systems remain permitted, and while such systems are not presently as common as they once were, dim-dip functionality was fitted on many new cars (such as the Volkswagen Polo) well into the 1990s.

=== Canada ===
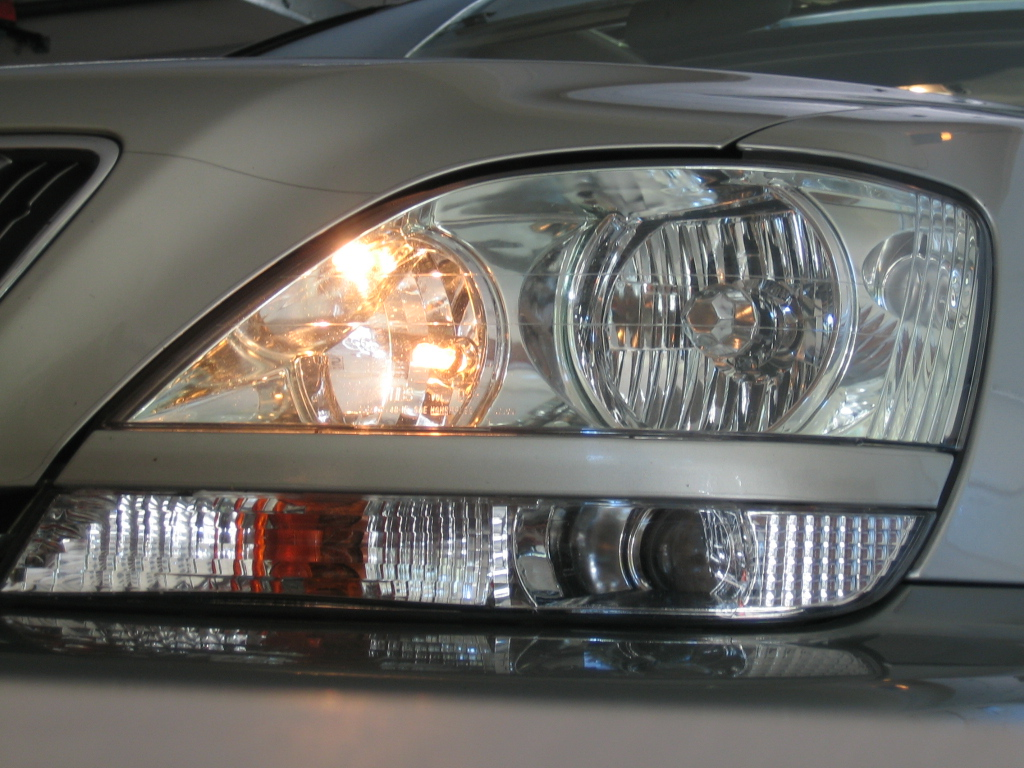
Reduced-voltage high beam DRL on a US/Canada 2002 Lexus RX300

Canada Motor Vehicle Safety Standard 108 requires DRLs on all new vehicles made or imported after 1 January 1990. Canada's proposed DRL regulation was essentially similar to regulations in place in Scandinavia, with an axial luminous intensity limit of 1,500 candela, but automakers claimed it was too expensive to add a new front lighting device, and would increase warranty costs (due to increased bulb replacements) to run the low beams. After a regulatory battle, the standard was rewritten to permit the use of reduced-voltage high beam headlamps producing up to 7,000 candela axially, as well as permitting any light color from white to amber or selective yellow. These changes to the regulation permitted automakers to implement a less costly DRL, such as by connecting the high beam filaments in series to supply each filament with half its rated voltage, or by burning the front turn signals full-time except when they are actually flashing as turn indicators.

=== United States ===
Shortly after Canada mandated DRLs, General Motors, interested in reducing the build variations of cars for the North American market, petitioned the US National Highway Traffic Safety Administration in 1990 to permit (but not require) US vehicles to be equipped with DRLs like those in Canada. NHTSA objected on grounds of the potential for high-intensity DRLs to cause problems, such as glare and turn signal masking, and issued a proposed rule in 1991 that specified a maximum intensity of 2,600 candela. Industry and safety watchdogs reacted to the proposed rule, and eventually the glare objections were set aside and most of the same types of DRLs allowed in Canada were permitted but not required effective with the 1995 model year. General Motors immediately equipped most (and, in following years, all) of its vehicles with DRLs beginning with the Chevrolet Corsica. Saab, Volkswagen, Volvo, Suzuki and Subaru gradually introduced DRLs in the US market beginning in 1995. In recent years, Lexus has installed high-beam or turn signal based DRLs on US models. Some Toyota models come with DRLs as standard or optional equipment, and with a driver-controllable on and off switch. Starting in the 2006 model year, Honda began equipping their US models with DRLs, mostly by reduced-intensity operation of the high beam headlamps.

Public reaction to DRLs, generally neutral to positive in Canada, is decidedly mixed in the US. Thousands of complaints regarding glare from DRLs were lodged with the DOT shortly after DRLs were permitted on cars, and there was also concern that headlamp-based DRLs reduce the conspicuity of motorcycles, and that DRLs based on front turn signals introduce ambiguity into the turn signal system. In 1997, in response to these complaints and after measuring actual DRL intensity well above the 7,000-candela limit on vehicles in use, DOT proposed changes to the DRL specification that would have capped axial intensity at 1,500 candela, a level equivalent to the European 1,200 candela and identical to the initially proposed Canadian limit. During the open comment period, a volume of public comments were received by NHTSA in support of lowering the intensity or advocating the complete elimination of DRLs from US roads. Automaker sentiment generally followed prevailing experience with European automakers experienced at complying with European DRL requirements voicing no objection to the proposal, and North American automakers repeating the same objections they raised in response to Canada's initial 1,500-candela proposal.

The NHTSA proposal for DRL intensity reduction was rescinded in 2004, pending agency review and decision on a petition filed in 2001 by General Motors, seeking to have NHTSA mandate DRLs on all US vehicles. The GM petition was denied by the NHTSA in 2009, on grounds of severe methodological and analytical flaws in the studies and data provided by GM as evidence for a safety benefit to DRLs. In denying the petition, the NHTSA said:

[...] the agency remains neutral with respect to a policy regarding the inclusion of DRLs in vehicles [...] we do not find data that provides a definitive safety benefit that justifies Federal regulation [...] manufacturers should continue to make individual decisions regarding DRLs in their vehicles.

Several states on the Eastern seaboard, the Southeast, Gulf Coast, and California have laws that require headlights to be switched on when windshield wipers are in use. DRLs are not considered headlights in most vehicle codes and so DRLs may not meet the letter of these laws in use.

=== Australia ===
DRLs are permitted but not required in Australia, though the Australasian College of Road Safety, an Australian automotive safety group, advocates making DRLs mandatory rather than optional.

== See also ==
- Automobile safety
- Bicycle safety
