= Motorcycling advocacy =

Activism on behalf of motorcyclists

Motorcycling advocacy is activism for motorcyclists seeking to establish and protect their rights, and to influence issues of interest to the motorcycling community. This includes lobbying organizations that work to influence laws, and groups or individuals who influence public attitudes.

The British Motorcycle Action Group was founded in 1973 specifically in response to helmet compulsion, which generated debate in the UK House of Commons at the time. In addition, the British Motorcyclists Federation (BMF), founded in 1960 as a reaction to the public perception of motorcyclists as leather-jacketed hooligans, has itself moved into political lobbying. The American ABATE similarly works to improve motorcycle safety, as well as runs charity fund-raising events, and rallies, often for motorcycle-related political interests.

In the United States, the National Highway Traffic Safety Administration (NHTSA, part of the Department of Transportation) has been the main federal government agency active in the debate over motorcycle rights for such things as off-road riding, vehicle requirements and helmets.

== Helmet laws ==
Motorcycle helmets greatly reduce injuries and fatalities in motorcycle accidents, thus many countries have laws requiring acceptable helmets to be worn by motorcycle riders. These laws vary considerably, sometimes exempting mopeds and other small-displacement bikes, with the UK exempting followers of the Sikh religion wearing a turban. Worldwide, many countries have defined their own sets of standards that are used to judge the effectiveness of a motorcycle helmet in an accident, and define the minimal acceptable standard thereof. In some countries, most notably the United States and India, there is some opposition to compulsory helmet use (see Helmet Law Defense League); not all U.S. states have a compulsory helmet law.

== Advocacy groups ==
- ABATE
- American Motorcyclist Association
- British Motorcyclists Federation, UK-based
- Federation of European Motorcyclists Associations
- Helmet Law Defense League (HLDL)
- Motorcycle Action Group (MAG), UK-based group originally formed to fight helmet legislation
