= Helmet Law Defense League =

Organization

The Helmet Law Defense League (HLDL) is a group founded in 1993 that opposes the laws in states which mandate motorcycle helmets. The group contends that mandatory motorcycle helmet laws enacted at the state, county, and municipal levels of government against consumers and users are unconstitutional due to vagueness, and this often results in arbitrary and ad hoc enforcement in those states which have enacted mandatory helmet laws.

The HLDL claims that the Federal Motor Vehicle Safety Standards (FMVSS) enacted by the US Congress at the United States Federal level under USC Title 49 Chapter 301 apply to manufacturers, importers, distributors, and retailers, but proscribe no regulation to consumers and motorists, and in the opinion of the HLDL's supporters, no enforcement guidelines for law enforcement agencies at the state level or below. Based on these opinions, the HLDL claims that in states which have embedded statutory reference to Federal Motor Vehicle Safety Standards, those standards are not applicable to consumers and those motorists who choose to use, or to not use, motorcycle helmets. Therefore, the HLDL says, enforcement actions are arbitrary and ad hoc.

The HLDL researches, analyzes, and publishes many different legal arguments founded on Constitutional law, statutory law, and common law.

Upon the (cancer) death of Richard "Quig" Quigley, biker rights advocate, on 15 September 2007, the HLDL internet site, which was constantly updated by Quigley, was frozen in time. Surviving members of the Helmet Law Defense League continue to be active in analyzing legal arguments, and contesting helmet laws in both pro se and attorney-assisted court cases. Publication of Helmet Law Defense League articles and updates, post-2007, has migrated to a think tank within the national motorcyclist rights collective known as Bikers of Lesser Tolerance (B.O.L.T.), which Richard Quigley was a member.

== See also ==
- Tax protester arguments
