= List of countries by traffic-related death rate =

Death rate road traffic injuries

This list of countries by traffic-related death rate shows the annual number of road fatalities per capita per year, per number of motor vehicles, and per vehicle-km in some countries in the year the data was collected.

According to the World Health Organization (WHO), road traffic injuries caused an estimated 1.35 million deaths worldwide in 2016. That is, one person is killed every 26 seconds on average.

Only 28 countries, representing 449 million people (seven percent of the world's population), have laws that address the five risk factors of speed, drunk driving, helmets, seat-belts and child restraints. Over a third of road traffic deaths in low- and middle-income countries are among pedestrians and cyclists. However, fewer than 35 percent of low- and middle-income countries have policies in place to protect these road users. The average rate was 17.4 per 100,000 people. Low-income countries now have the highest annual road traffic fatality rates, at 24.1 per 100,000, while the rate in high-income countries is lowest, at 9.2 per 100,000.

Seventy-four percent of road traffic deaths occur in middle-income countries, which account for only 53 percent of the world's registered vehicles. In low-income countries it is even worse. Only one percent of the world's registered cars produce 16 percent of world's road traffic deaths. This indicates that these countries bear a disproportionately high burden of road traffic deaths relative to their level of motorization.

In the United States, fatal crashes involving cyclists, motorcyclists, and pedestrians are on the rise, offsetting the decrease in fatal crashes involving only passenger cars. As a result, the overall reduction in fatal crashes from 1991 to 2021 is only 21%. In contrast, other developed countries tracked by the International Transport Forum saw a median decrease of 77% in fatal crashes, with Spain experiencing the largest reduction. On a population-adjusted basis, Spain had 86% fewer car crash fatalities in 2021 compared to 1991.

There are large disparities in road traffic death rates between regions. The risk of dying as a result of a road traffic injury is highest in the African Region (26.6 per 100 000 population), and lowest in the European Region (9.3 per 100 000).

Adults aged between 15 and 44 years account for 59 percent of global road traffic deaths. 77 percent of road deaths are males.

The total fatalities figures comes from the WHO report (table A2, column point estimate, pp. 264–271) and are often an adjusted number of road traffic fatalities in order to reflect the different reporting and counting methods among the many countries (e.g., "a death after how many days since accident event is still counted as a road fatality?" (by international standard adjusted to a 30-day period), or "to compensate for under-reporting in some countries".

== List ==
The table shows that the highest death tolls tend to be in African countries, and the lowest in European countries. The table first lists WHO geographic regions before alphabetically sorted countries.

(For context, this list shall be cross-referenced with lists of motor vehicles or motorcycles per capita, as numerous countries have low per capita vehicle ownership; being either heavily reliant on motorcycles or public transportation.)

Country/region	Continent	Per 100,000 inhabitants	Per 1 billion vehicle-km	Total (Note: Latest year (adjusted/estimated figures from WHO report))	Year (Note: Standard source: WHO report 2019)
Global		15.0		1,282,150	2021
Africa		19.4		297,087	2021
Eastern Mediterranean		16.4		126,958	2021
Western Pacific		15.2		317,393	2021
Southeast Asia		16.1		317,069	2021
Americas		14.1		154,780	2021
Europe		6.7		68,863	2021
Zimbabwe	Africa	41.2		6,037	2019
Liberia	Africa	38.9		1920	2019
Eritrea	Africa	37.9		1,326	2019
South Sudan	Africa	36.7		4,063	2019
Democratic Republic of the Congo	Africa	34.9		30,256	2019
Namibia	Africa	34.8		868	2019
Malawi	Africa	33.4		6,221	2019
Tonga	Oceania	33.0		34	2019
Guinea-Bissau	Africa	32.2		619	2019
Lesotho	Africa	31.9		678	2019
Vietnam	Asia	30.6		29,475	2019
Mozambique	Africa	30.0		9,117	2019
Congo	Africa	29.7		1,598	2019
Guinea	Africa	29.7		3,788	2019
Gambia	Africa	29.6		695	2019
Yemen	Asia	29.4		8,561	2019
Madagascar	Africa	29.2		7,880	2019
Togo	Africa	28.7		2,316	2019
Ethiopia	Africa	28.2		31,564	2019
Burkina Faso	Africa	27.8		6,137	2021
Dominican Republic	North America	27.5		2,921	2022
Iraq	Asia	27.3		10,726	2019
Sudan	Africa	26.8		11,459	2019
Comoros	Africa	26.6		226	2019
Chad	Africa	26.4		4,533	2021
Central African Republic	Africa	25.9		1,412	2021
Ghana	Africa	25.7		7,808	2019
Mauritania	Africa	25.6		1,158	2019
Niger	Africa	25.5		5,946	2019
Thailand	Asia	25.4		18,218	2021
Benin	Africa	24.8		3,225	2021
Eswatini	Africa	24.7		295	2021
North Korea	Asia	24.2		6,210	2019
Afghanistan	Asia	24.1		9,684	2021
Ivory Coast	Africa	24.1		6,202	2019
Ecuador	South America	23.4		4,173	2021
Senegal	Africa	23.4		3,832	2019
Mali	Africa	22.7		4,465	2019
Palau	Oceania	22.2		4	2021
South Africa	Africa	22.2		13,014	2019
El Salvador	North America	21.5		1,358	2021
Iran	Asia	21.5		17,803	2019
Libya	Africa	21.3		1,444	2019
Mongolia	Asia	21.0		679	2019
Paraguay	South America	21.0		1,405	2021
Nigeria	Africa	20.7		41,693	2019
Zambia	Africa	20.5		3,654	2019
Myanmar	Asia	20.4		11,004	2019
Somalia	Africa	20.2		3,440	2021
Cambodia	Asia	18.8		3,113	2021
Bangladesh	Asia	18.6		31,578	2021
Honduras	North America	18.5		1,904	2021
Saudi Arabia	Asia	18.5		6,651	2021
Algeria	Africa	18.3		8,106	2021
Laos	Asia	17.9		1,281	2019
Jamaica	North America	17.8		502	2021
Bolivia	South America	17.6		2,127	2021
Cook Islands	Oceania	17.6		3	2021
Belize	North America	17.5		70	2021
China	Asia	17.4		248,099	2021
Azerbaijan	Asia	17.2		1,769	2021
Morocco	Africa	17.0		6,185	2019
Botswana	Africa	16.5		426	2021
Cape Verde	Africa	16.5		97	2021
Tunisia	Africa	16.5		1,928	2019
Lebanon	Asia	16.4		1,127	2019
Nepal	Asia	16.3		4,654	2019
Bahamas	North America	16.2		66	2021
Suriname	South America	16.2		99	2021
Uganda	Africa	16.0		7,315	2021
Tanzania	Africa	15.8		10,052	2021
Brazil	South America	15.7		33,586	2021
Tajikistan	Asia	15.7		1,461	2019
Colombia	South America	15.5		8,030	2022
Costa Rica	North America	15.5		798	2021
Kuwait	Asia	15.4		649	2019
Guyana	South America	15.2		122	2021
Angola	Africa	15.0		5,188	2021
Syria	Asia	14.9		2,550	2019
United States	North America	14.2	6.9	47,750	2021
Micronesia	Oceania	14.1		16	2021
Malaysia	Asia	13.9	16.2 (Note: Figure from 2010.)	4,680	2021
Sierra Leone	Africa	13.8		1,165	2021
Bosnia and Herzegovina	Europe	13.7		447	2021
Armenia	Asia	13.6		379	2021
Jordan	Asia	13.6		1,514	2021
Nicaragua	North America	13.6		932	2021
Djibouti	Africa	13.5		229	2019
Fiji	Oceania	13.5		120	2019
Turkmenistan	Asia	13.5		800	2019
Venezuela	South America	13.2		3,718	2021
Pakistan	Asia	13.0		28,170	2019
Samoa	Oceania	13.0		26	2019
Uruguay	South America	13.0		447	2021
Kazakhstan	Asia	12.7		2,352	2019
Kyrgyzstan	Asia	12.7		812	2019
Peru	South America	12.7		4,284	2021
Guatemala	North America	12.6		2,221	2021
India	Asia	12.6		172,000	2023
Papua New Guinea	Oceania	12.6		1,105	2019
Gabon	Africa	12.5		293	2021
Vanuatu	Oceania	12.5		40	2021
Georgia	Europe	12.4		496	2019
Burundi	Africa	12.3		1,546	2021
Bhutan	Asia	12.2		95	2021
Mauritius	Africa	12.2		155	2019
Taiwan	Asia	12.1		2,865	2019
Mexico	North America	12.0	27.5	15,267	2021
Philippines	Asia	12.0		13,017	2019
Marshall Islands	Oceania	11.9		5	2021
Timor-Leste	Asia	11.9		154	2019
Equatorial Guinea	Africa	11.7		192	2021
São Tomé and Príncipe	Africa	11.7		26	2021
Uzbekistan	Asia	11.7		3,853	2019
Rwanda	Africa	11.6		1,563	2021
Sri Lanka	Asia	11.5		2,513	2021
Indonesia	Asia	11.3		30,668	2019
Seychelles	Africa	11.3		11	2019
Solomon Islands	Oceania	11.2		79	2021
Dominica	North America	11.0		8	2021
Oman	Asia	11.0		497	2021
Albania	Europe	10.8		309	2021
Cameroon	Africa	10.6		2,870	2021
Russia	Europe	10.6		15,335	2021
Ukraine	Europe	10.5		4,558	2021
Egypt	Africa	10.1		10,141	2019
Barbados	North America	10.0		28	2021
Latvia	Europe	9.8		183	2021
Romania	Europe	9.6		1,856	2021
Montenegro	Europe	9.1		57	2021
Saint Lucia	North America	8.9		16	2021
United Arab Emirates	Asia	8.9		870	2019
Argentina	South America	8.8		3,983	2021
Bulgaria	Europe	8.4		578	2021
Kenya	Africa	8.2		4,386	2023
Bahrain	Asia	8.1		118	2021
Croatia	Europe	8.1		328	2021
Moldova	Europe	7.9		189	2025
Chile	South America	7.7		1,439	2024
Antigua and Barbuda	North America	7.5		7	2021
Belarus	Europe	7.4		706	2021
Serbia	Europe	7.4		537	2021
New Zealand	Oceania	7.3	7.2	375	2022
Panama	North America	7.3		316	2021
Qatar	Asia	7.3		206	2019
Turkey	Asia	6.7		5,573	2019
Grenada	North America	6.4		8	2021
Slovakia	Europe	6.4		346	2021
Kiribati	Oceania	6.2		8	2021
Greece	Europe	6.1		641	2022
San Marino	Europe	5.9		2	2021
Hungary	Europe	5.5		536	2022
Luxembourg	Europe	5.5		36	2022
Cuba	North America	5.4		613	2021
Italy	Europe	5.3		3,159	2022
North Macedonia	Europe	5.1		107	2019
Poland	Europe	5.0		1,896	2022
Trinidad and Tobago	North America	5.0		77	2021
France	Europe	4.9	5.8	3,267	2022
South Korea	Asia	4.9	8.2	2,551	2023
Saint Vincent and the Grenadines	North America	4.8		5	2021
Canada	North America	4.7	4.3	1,805	2021
Belgium	Europe	4.6	7.3	540	2022
Australia	Oceania	4.5	4.9	1,180	2022
Portugal	Europe	4.4		462	2022
Lithuania	Europe	4.2		120	2022
Austria	Europe	4.1	5.1	379	2022
Czech Republic	Europe	4.1		438	2024
Malta	Europe	4.1		18	2019
Netherlands	Europe	4.1	4.7	737	2022
Slovenia	Europe	4.0	7.0	85	2022
Cyprus	Europe	3.9		49	2021
Spain	Europe	3.7		1,759	2022
Brunei	Asia	3.6		16	2021
Israel	Asia	3.6	5.9	351	2022
Finland	Europe	3.4	5.1	189	2022
Germany	Europe	3.3	4.2	2,788	2022
Estonia	Europe	3.1		43	2025
Ireland	Europe	3.0	3.8	155	2022
Switzerland	Europe	2.7	3.2	241	2022
Denmark	Europe	2.6	3.9	154	2022
United Kingdom	Europe	2.6	3.8	1,749	2022
Andorra	Europe	2.5		2	2021
Iceland	Europe	2.3	4.9	9	2022
Japan	Asia	2.1		2,678	2023
Norway	Europe	2.1	3.0	116	2022
Singapore	Asia	2.1		121	2019
Sweden	Europe	2.1	3.3	227	2022
Maldives	Asia	1.6		9	2019
Monaco	Europe	0.0		0	2021

== See also ==
- Epidemiology of motor vehicle collisions
- Traffic collision
- Road traffic safety
- Smeed's law
- List of countries and territories by motor vehicles per capita

Nations:

- List of motor vehicle deaths in Australia by year
- Road toll (Australia and New Zealand)
- List of motor vehicle deaths in Iceland by year
- List of road traffic accidents deaths in the Republic of Ireland by year
- List of motor vehicle deaths in Japan by year
- List of motor vehicle deaths in Thailand by year
- Motor vehicle fatality rate in U.S. by year
- Road safety in Europe

General:

- List of causes of death by rate
