= Road safety in Australia =

Road deaths in Australia, 1983 to 2008

Around 1,200 people are killed each year on Australia's roads and about 40,000 are seriously injured. Australia has a goal of zero deaths and serious injuries on its roads by 2050 (Vision Zero).

The National Road Safety Strategy 2021–30 sets a target of 50% reduction in deaths and 30% reduction in serious injuries by 2030.

As of February 2026, Australia is not on track to reach its road safety targets, with 1,296 deaths on roads in the 12 months to April 2024 and a rising number of lives lost over the past five years.

Introducing 30km/h speeds in urban residential areas would reduce the annual number of lives lost on Australian roads by 13 per cent.

== Overview ==
In Australia road deaths are reported at a state level as well as nationally by the Bureau of Infrastructure and Transport Research Economics. Similar to New Zealand, Australia also reports national figures for special holidays, though usually only for the Christmas and Easter holiday periods.

In 2010, 1367 people lost their lives in road traffic crashes in Australia. While strategies to reduce road deaths, including legislation, improvements to vehicles which help to make them safer, and educational programs have been developed by the national government, under the 1992 Road Safety Strategy, it is up to the local governments to adopt and enforce these policies. The state of Victoria has implemented several initiatives such as speed camera, random alcohol breath tests, and an integrated state trauma system, which have successfully reduced the number of deaths caused by road traffic crashes. Requiring motorists and passengers to wear seat belts appears to have reduced road deaths in Australia.

Random breath testing ("RBT"), utilised throughout Australia, differs from the sobriety check-points commonly used in other countries. In Australia, random breath testing is accomplished by setting up a highly visible road block, wherein all drivers passing through are asked to take an alcohol breath test, regardless of whether there is any cause to believe the driver has been drinking. RBT was shown to reduce alcohol related road deaths by 8–71% in fourteen different studies reviewed by Dr. Corinne Peek-Asa.

=== New South Wales ===
In the state of New South Wales the agency responsible for managing roads and streets is Transport for NSW. The first listed priority in the October 2025 "Connecting NSW Strategy Priorities for Transport" strategy is "Towards zero trauma". Daily statistics are published on the NSW Centre for Road Safety Statistics page.

In NSW, permanent 40 km/h speed limits in High Pedestrian Activity Areas (HPAA) have significantly reduced road trauma. Roads with HPAAs have almost double the reduction in casualty crashes compared to other urban roads since 2003.

The Transport for NSW 2026 Road Safety Action Plan has an identical target to National Road Safety Strategy 2021–30. The 2026 Road Safety Action Plan includes a commitment to applying safer speed settings, particularly 30 km/h and 40 km/h, as well as 10 km/h and 20 km/h zones.

In 2022, TfNSW commissioned Real Time Traffic with its partner Lab3 to provision a deployable computer vision technology to detect and report near misses and crashes weekly. Over a period of two weeks, 217 near misses were detected at two locations.

== Use of the term 'road toll' ==
'Road toll' is a legacy term used in Australia for the number of deaths caused annually by road crashes. While the term is still sometime used, most agencies instead using the phase "road deaths", "road fatalities", "lives lost" or "road trauma". The problem with talking about 'road toll' is that "it implies that road trauma is an acceptable cost of having roads." Journalists and media reporting guidelines suggest not using the term.

== History ==
In Canberra, the 1985 National Capital Development Commission report titled Transport Implications of City Development indicated concern that "concentration of metropolitan employment in City" would increase accident [sic] rates significantly. A draft edit included that:

One major safety issue in residential areas will be that of young children on route to schools. The extent of residential area parking and residential street traffic volumes predicted imply a real probability of serious accidents involving school children. Political pressures will be exceedingly strong to have immediate solutions in such situations. There may also be a case for Commonwealth liability.

== See also ==
- List of countries by traffic-related death rate
- List of motor vehicle deaths in Australia by year
- Australian Road Rules
- Speed limits in Australia
