= Epidemiology of motor vehicle collisions =

Death rate road traffic injuries

Worldwide, it was estimated that 1.25 million people were killed and many millions more were injured in motor vehicle collisions in 2013. This makes motor vehicle collisions the leading cause of death among young adults of 15–29 years of age (360,000 die a year) and the ninth most frequent cause of death for all ages worldwide. In the United States, 40,100 people died and 2.8 million were injured in crashes in 2017, and around 2,000 children under 16 years old die every year.

== History and trends ==
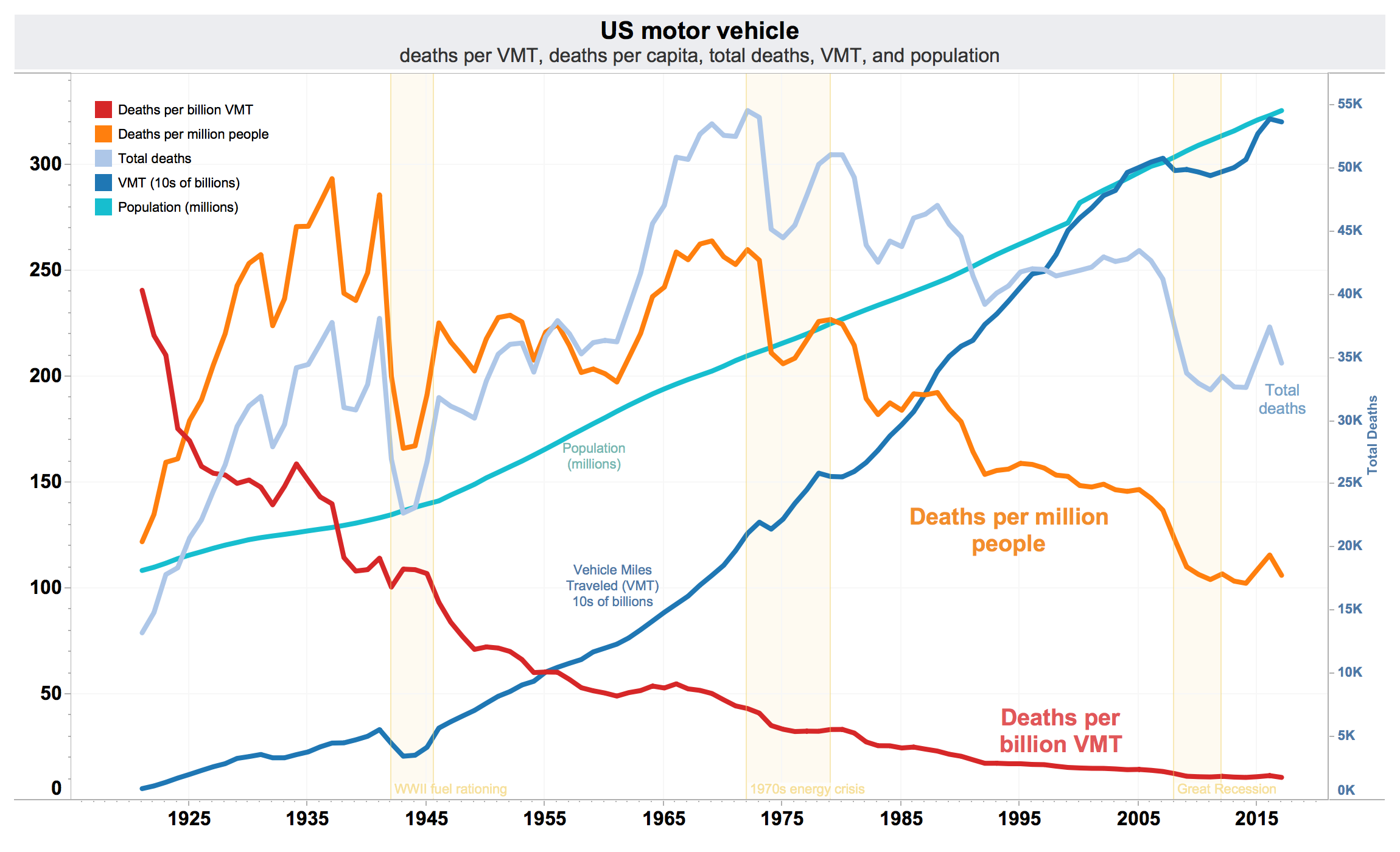
Annual US traffic fatalities per billion vehicle miles traveled (red), per one million people (orange), total annual deaths (light blue), VMT in tens of billions (dark blue) and population in millions (teal), from 1921 to 2017

Road toll figures in developed nations show that car collision fatalities have declined since 1980. Japan is an extreme example, with road deaths decreasing to 5,115 in 2008, which was 25% of the 1970 rate per capita and 17% of the 1970 rate per vehicle distance travelled. In 2008, for the first time, more pedestrians than vehicle occupants were killed in Japan by cars. Besides improving general road conditions like lighting and separated walkways, Japan has been installing intelligent transportation system technology such as stalled-car monitors to avoid crashes.

In developing nations, statistics may be grossly inaccurate or hard to get. Some nations have not significantly reduced the total death rate, which stood at 12,000 in Thailand in 2007, for example.

In the United States, twenty-eight states had reductions in the number of automobile crash fatalities between 2005 and 2006. 55% of vehicle occupants 16 years or older in 2006 were not using seat belts when they crashed.

Road fatality trends tend to follow Smeed's law, an empirical schema that correlates increased fatality rates per capita with traffic congestion.

=== Deaths in 2005 ===
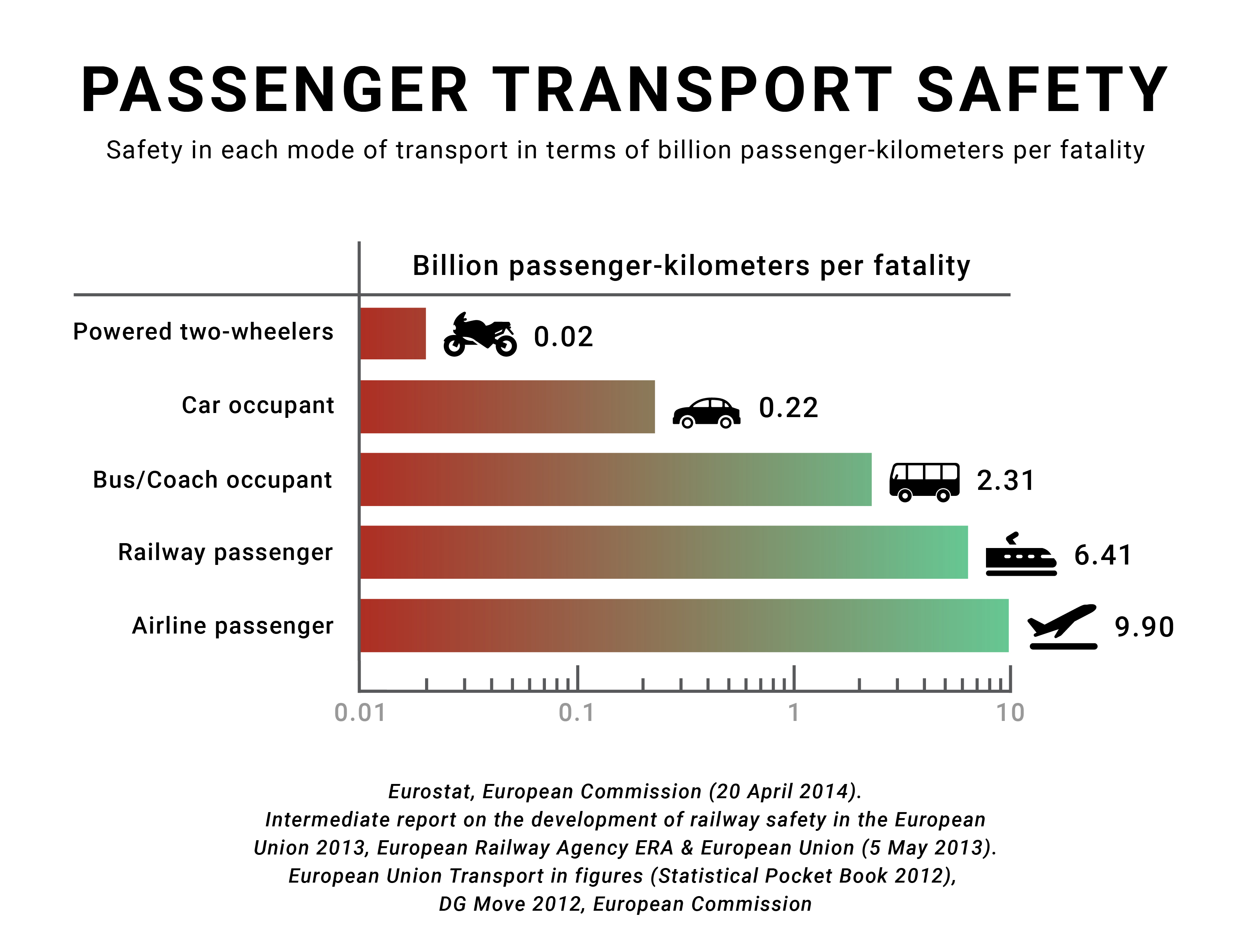
According to Eurostat the automobile is one of the least safe means of transport, if safety is measured as the fewest fatalities per travelled distance. Based on data by EU-27 member nations, 2008–2010.

Crashes are categorized by what is struck and the direction of impact, or impacts. These are some common crash types, based on the total number that occurred in the US in 2005, the percentage of total crashes, and the percentage of fatal crashes:

- Rear impacts (1,824,000 crashes, 29.6% of all US crashes, 5.4% of US fatal crashes)
- Angle or side impacts (1,779,000 crashes, 28.9% of all US crashes, 20.7% of US fatal crashes)
- Run-off-road collisions (992,000 crashes, 16.1% of US crashes, 31.7% of US fatal crashes)
- Collisions with animals (275,000 crashes, 4.5% of US crashes, 0.4% of fatal crashes)
- Rollovers (141,000 crashes, 2.3% of all US crashes, 10.9% of US fatal crashes)
- Head-on collision (123,000 crashes, only 2.0% of all US crashes, but 10.1% of US fatal crashes)
- Collisions with pedestrians and bicyclists (114,000 crashes, only 1.8% of US crashes, but 13.5% of US fatal crashes)
- Back-up collisions killed 221 people in the US in 2007, and injured about 14,400. This is one of the most common types of non-traffic auto collision in which road workers and children 15 and younger are killed.

Rollover, head-on, pedestrian, and bicyclist crashes combined are only 6.1% of all crashes, but cause 34.5% of traffic-related fatalities.

Sometimes the vehicles in the collision can suffer more than one type of impact, such as during a shunt or high-speed spin. This is called a "second harmful event," such as when a vehicle is redirected by the first crash into another vehicle or fixed object.

Country	Surface (thousands of km^{2})	Population (millions)	Population Density/km^{2}	Vehicles in circulation (thousands)	Length of road network (kilometers)	Circulation (millions of vehicles x km)	Number of vehicles/100 inhabitants	Deaths per million inhabitants	Deaths per billion km travelled
Austria	84	8.2	97.7	5,279	107,143	82,221	64.5	93.8	9.3
Belgium	33	10.4	320.3	6,159	151,372	94,677	59.1	104.5	11.5
Czech Republic	79	10.2	129.6	4,732	55,495	50,262	46.3	95.8	17.2
Denmark	43	5.4	126	2,570	72,074	47,940	47.3	61	6.9
Finland	338	5.2	15.5	2,871	79,150	51,675	54.7	72.2	7.3
France	551	60.5	109.7	37,168	1,002 486	552,800	61.4	77.9	9.6
Germany	357	82.5	231.1	54,520	626,981	684,283	66.1	74.8	7.8
Greece	132	11.1	84	6,641	40,164	81,635	59.9	149.1	20.3
Hungary	93	10.1	108.5	3,370	180,994	ND	33.4	96.6	ND
Republic of Ireland	71	4.1	58.6	1,937	95,752	37,840	46.7	96.2	10.5
Italy	301	58.1	192.8	43,141	305,388	654,197	74.3	94	8.3
Luxembourg	3	0.5	179.8	358	2,876	2,875	77	98.9	16.0
Netherlands	42	16.3	392.5	8,627	117,430	133,800	52.9	46	5.6
Poland	323	38.5	119.4	16,815	381,462	377,289	43.6	81.3	10.4
Portugal	93	10.5	113.3	5,481	81,739	ND	52.2	118.8	ND
United Kingdom	244	60.2	246.7	33,717	413,120	499,396	56	55.9	6.7
Slovakia	49	5.4	110.1	1,834	17,755	13,402	34	112.6	45.4
Slovenia	20	2	97	1,150	20,196	15,519	58.5	69*	16.6
Spain	505	43.4	86	27,657	666,204	ND	63.7	103.1	ND
Sweden	450	9	20.1	5,131	214,000	75,196	56.8	48.7	5.9
Partial Total Eu (20 countries)	3809	451.1	118.4	269,158	4,631,781	3,451,938	59.7	87.5	11.6
Iceland	103	0.3	2.9	236	91,916	2,006	80.3	64.6	9.5
Norway	324	4.6	14.3	2,938	92,511	36,550	63.6	48.5	6.1
Switzerland	41	7.4	179.6	5,043	71,027	62,685	68	55.2	6.5

Representation of regional death statistics on map reveals significant differences even between neighboring regions.

Source IRTAD for the following data:

- Number of vehicles: 2005 except Ireland 2003; Luxembourg 2004; Slovakia 2002.
- Length of the network: 2005 except Hungary and Luxembourg 2004; Germany and Denmark 2003; Slovakia 2002; Iceland 2000; Ireland 2001; Netherlands 1999; Greece and United Kingdom 1998; Portugal 1993; Italy 1992.
- Distance in Kilometres: 2005 except Denmark 2004; Italy and Netherlands 2003; Ireland 2001; Iceland and Slovakia 2000; United Kingdom and Greece 1998.
- Population: source IRTAD except for Ireland, Luxembourg, Slovakia, Sweden, Iceland and Norway: source INED.

== Deaths ==
=== Deaths per passenger-kilometer ===
The 28 EU-28 countries, for the 28 members, computed an indicator named "per 10 billion pkm". Pkm is an indicator of traffic volume which is used for not having consistent vehicle-kilometre data. Are counted cars and estimated motorised two-wheelers. In 2016, this indicator ranges from 23 for Sweden to 192 for Romania, with a value of 52 for the EU-28. In Germany, France, the UK and Italy, this score is respectively 33, 46, 28, 44.

=== Deaths in Europe ===
In 2019, the 27 members states of the European Union had 51 road deaths per million inhabitants. Because the UK had less fatalities than the average EU and due to Brexit; this rate raised to 51. Including the UK, the rate of the 28 would have been 48.

The safest of those 28 nations was Sweden (22 deaths/million inhabitants) while Romania reported the highest fatality rates of the EU in 2019. (96/million).

=== Deaths in the United States of America ===
In 2022, the NHTSA counted 42,795 fatalities in motor vehicle traffic crashes; that is 13.5 fatalities per billion vehicle miles traveled (8.39 fatalities per billion vehicle kilometers).

== See also ==
- Road-traffic safety
- Management systems for road safety
- Smeed's law

Nations:

- List of motor vehicle deaths in Australia by year
- List of motor vehicle deaths in Japan by year
- List of motor vehicle deaths in Thailand by year
- List of motor vehicle deaths in U.S. by year and Transportation safety in the United States
