= Road safety in New Zealand =

Road deaths in New Zealand, 1951 to 2008

In 2026, the provisional number of road deaths in New Zealand for the year stands at 294.

The New Zealand Government publishes Road Safety Objectives, which outlines a plan for tackling road safety issues.

== Overview ==
New Zealand reports a daily, monthly, quarterly and annual nationwide road death statistics, plus special period figures for a number of holiday periods:

- Christmas – New Year : between 4pm on 24 December (22 or 23 December if 24 December falls on a weekend) and 6am on 3 January (4 or 5 January if 1 and/or 2 January fall on a weekend or 2 January falls on a Friday).
- Easter — from 4pm on the day before Good Friday and 6am the following Tuesday.
- Queen's Birthday — from 4pm on the Friday before the first Monday in June to 6am the following Tuesday.
- Labour Day Weekend — from 4pm on the Friday before the last Monday in October to 6am the following Tuesday.

The road deaths statistics include deaths which occur within 30 days of a road accident as a result of injuries received in the accident. Deaths of pedestrians and cyclists are included, but deaths from vehicular accidents not on legal roads (e.g. on farms) are excluded.

The New Zealand road deaths statistics have exhibited a downward trend since the late 1980s through to 2019, which was attributed to a number of factors:

- A reduction in drink driving, due to public education and strict policing.
- Improvements in vehicle safety.
- An increase in the wearing of seat belts due to public education
- Hazard mitigation works on dangerous stretches of road.
- Reduction of speed limits in some accident blackspots and areas frequented by vulnerable road users.

=== Recent road deaths statistics ===
Road deaths statistics are available from as far back as 1921, when records began. A peak was reached with 843 deaths in 1973. Here are some figures from the last few years (dashes indicate figures not published or unavailable).

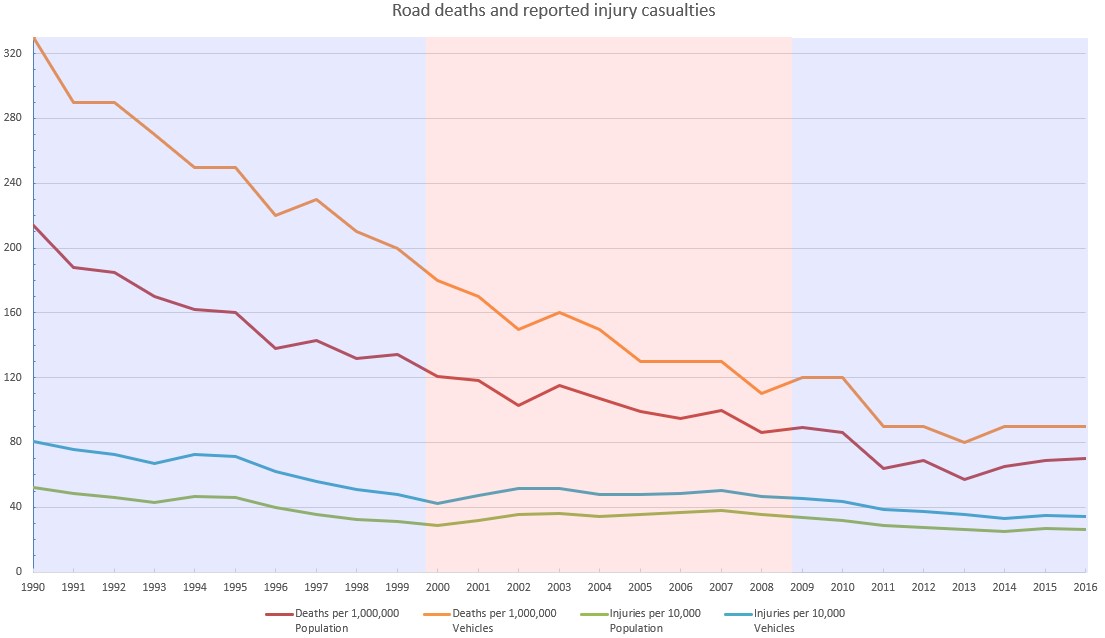
New Zealand Road Deaths and reported injury casualties 1990-2016

Year	Road deaths	Fatal crashes	No. of injuries
2012	308	-	12,122
2013	253	-	11,781
2014	293	-	11,219
2015	317	-	12,270
2016	327	285	12,456
2017	378	344	14,039
2018	378		14,696
2019	350		14,742
2020	318	292	
2021	318	285	
2022	372	335	
2023	343	306	

==== Deaths per capita ====
Road deaths and injuries per capita since 2000.

Year	Population (000)	Vehicles (000)	No. of fatalities	Per 100,000 population	Per 10,000 vehicles	No. of injuries	Per 100,000 population	Per 10,000 vehicles
2000	3830.8	2601.7	462	12.1	1.8	10962	286	42.1
2001	3850.1	2633.2	455	11.8	1.7	12368	321	47.0
2002	3939.1	2709.5	405	10.3	1.5	13918	353	51.4
2003	4009.2	2801.0	461	11.5	1.6	14372	359	51.3
2004	4060.9	2920.7	435	10.7	1.5	13890	342	47.6
2005	4098.3	3030.4	405	9.9	1.3	14451	353	47.7
2006	4139.5	3124.3	393	9.5	1.3	15174	367	48.6
2007	4228.3	3189.1	421	10.0	1.3	16013	379	50.2
2008	4268.6	3247.8	366	8.6	1.1	15174	356	46.7
2009	4315.8	3220.3	384	8.9	1.2	14541	337	45.2
2010	4367.8	3230.6	375	8.6	1.2	14031	321	43.4
2011	4405.3	3233.6	284	6.4	0.9	12574	285	38.9
2012	4433.0	3250.1	308	6.9	0.9	12122	273	37.3
2013	4471.1	3304.7	253	5.7	0.8	11781	264	35.6
2014	4509.9	3398.1	293	6.5	0.9	11219	249	33.0
2015	4596.7	3514.8	319	6.9	0.9	12270	267	34.9
2016	4693.0	3656.3	327	7.0	0.9	12456	265	34.1
2017	4,765	3,827	378	7.9	1	14,039	299	36.7
2018	4,841	3,975	378	7.8	1	14,696	304	37
2019	4,920	4,076	352	7.2	0.9	14,742	300	36.2

==== By types of road user ====
A breakdown of the types of road users involved in the road death deaths statistics since 2010.

Year	Drivers	Passengers	Motor Cyclists	Cyclists	Pedestrians	Other	Total
Highest:	307(1987)	250 (1973)	146(1988)	41 (1957)	157 (1973)	-	-
Lowest:	49 (1952)	49 (2013)	28 (2003)	5(2016)	25 (2015/2016)		
2010	180	98	50	10	36	2	375
2011	150	61	33	9	31	0	284
2012	135	82	50	8	33	0	308
2013	125	49	39	8	30	2	253
2014	127	70	43	10	43	0	293
2015	157	75	54	6	25	2	319
2016	163	78	52	5	25	4	327
2017	161	66	34	16	32		309
2018	191	92	45	6	40	4	378
2019	173	79	51	13	29	3	348
2020	158	64	53	11	30	2	318
2021	170	72	43	7	25	1	318
2022	202	64	50	19	36	1	372
2023	184	72	53	9	25	0	343

==== By age ====
The following table gives the number of road deaths by age group from 2010. The total killed includes unknown aged fatalities.

Year	0–14 years	15–24 years	25–39 years	40–59 years	60+ years	TOTAL
2010	18	113	76	83	85	375
2011	11	82	46	79	65	284
2012	14	62	68	78	84	308
2013	6	64	41	76	64	253
2014	13	61	66	69	81	293
2015	8	84	73	79	74	319
2016	17	82	64	93	71	327
2017	12	66	79	75	76	309
2018	18	69	67	65	84	303
2019	23	40	54	87	68	272
2020	10	64	73	83	88	318
2021	14	62	92	80	70	318
2022	9	73	92	86	101	372
2023	8	76	99	70	90	343

==== By region ====
Local Body boundary changes mean that records have been kept from 1980 onwards. In November 2010, the Auckland Super City was established. The figures have been altered for Auckland and other regions to allow for this development.

REGION	Lowest Total	Highest Total	2012	2013	2014	2015	2016	2017	2018	2019	2020
Northland	7 (2011)	54 (1989)	18	21	18	23	27	28	27	25	23
Auckland	36 (2014)	197 (1987)	41	48	36	52	46	54	46	34	25
Waikato	33 (2013)	141 (1991)	65	33	48	69	79	54	58	65	50
Bay of Plenty	18 (2013)	70 (1987)	23	18	30	29	31	19	29	32	24
Gisborne / Hawke's Bay	10 (2013)	64 (1986)	31	10	19	15	16	23	18	17	26
Taranaki	7 (2013)	45 (1991)	17	7	11	8	12	2	15	15	11
Manawatu/Wanganui	15 (2013)	81 (1987)	29	15	34	28	16	28	36	16	26
Wellington	10 (2015)	71 (1987)	11	18	12	10	16	12	10	8	11
Nelson / Marlborough	5 (2015)	27 (1984)	9	9	7	5	10	12	7	5	11
West Coast	2 (2020)	18 (2001)	7	9	9	7	4	6	3	3	2
Canterbury	32 (2009)	96 (1989)	33	49	38	47	34	45	38	35	23
Otago	11 (2009)	43 (1988)	17	14	19	18	20	13	9	12	18
Southland	2 (2013)	25 (1984)	7	2	12	8	16	13	7	5	8

==== Trucks ====
Around 20% of deaths involve trucks, though trucks form only about 3% of traffic on the roads. A speed study of 188 trucks found 86% took corners faster than the recommended speed and, of truck crashes on the Kaikōura coast, 73% had rolled on a corners with an advisory speed sign.

==== Tourist road deaths ====
Overseas licence holders are involved in just over 6 percent of fatal and injury crashes. In 2016 overseas drivers (those with an overseas drivers licence) were involved in 24 fatal traffic crashes, 114 serious injury crashes and 506 minor injury crashes. In comparison, in total in New Zealand in 2016, there were 286 fatal crashes, 2,099 serious injury crashes and 7,583 minor injury crashes. Over the five years from 2012 to 2016, 6.2 percent of fatal and injury crashes involved an overseas driver. Over the same period, 4.1 percent of all drivers involved in crashes were overseas drivers. In 2019 6 fatal crashes involved overseas drivers, killing 17 people.

== Use of the term 'road toll' ==
'Road toll' is a legacy term used in New Zealand for the number of deaths caused annually by road accidents. While the term is still sometime used, the New Zealand Ministry of Transport now uses the term "road deaths". The problem with talking about 'road toll' is that "it implies that road trauma is an acceptable cost of having roads." Journalists and media reporting guidelines suggest not using the term.

== See also ==
- List of countries by traffic-related death rate
