= Road toll =

Road toll may refer to:

- Road toll (modern), a fee for use of roads today
- Road toll (historical), a historic fee for the use of roads
- Road toll (Australia and New Zealand), the death toll on Australasian roads
