= Sustainable Development Goal 3 =

United Nations goal of good health and well-being

- Commercial?: No
- Type of project: Non-Profit
- Location: Global
- Founder: United Nations (UN)
- Established: 2015
- Website: sdgs.un.org

The Sustainable Development Goal 3 (SDG 3 or Global Goal 3), as one of the Sustainable Development Goals established by the United Nations in 2015, promotes "good health and well-being," specifically aiming "to ensure healthy lives and promote well-being for all at all ages." The targets of SDG 3 focus on various aspects of healthy life and healthy lifestyle. Progress towards the targets is measured using 28 indicators. SDG 3 aims to achieve universal health coverage and equitable access of healthcare services to all men and women. It proposes to end the preventable death of newborns, infants and children under five (child mortality) and end epidemics.

SDG 3 has 13 targets and 28 indicators to measure progress toward targets. The first nine targets are outcome targets:

- reducing maternal mortality
- ending all preventable deaths under five years of age
- fighting communicable diseases
- reducing mortality from non-communicable diseases and promoting mental health
- preventing and treating substance abuse
- reducing road injuries and deaths
- granting universal access to sexual and reproductive care, family planning and education
- achieving universal health coverage
- reducing illnesses and deaths from hazardous chemicals and pollution.

The four means of implementation targets are:

- implementing the WHO Framework Convention on Tobacco Control
- supporting research, development, and universal access to affordable vaccines and medicines
- increasing health financing and support the health workforce in developing countries
- improving early warning systems for global health risks.

Good health is essential to sustainable development and the 2030 Agenda. It focuses on broader economic and social inequalities, urbanization, climate crisis, and the continuing burden of HIV and other infectious diseases, while not forgetting emerging challenges such as non-communicable diseases.

Progress has been made in increasing life expectancy and reducing some of the common causes of child and maternal mortality. Between 2000 and 2016, the worldwide under-five mortality rate decreased by 47 percent (from 78 deaths per 1,000 live births to 41 deaths per 1,000 live births). Still, the number of children dying under age five is very high: 5.6 million in 2016.

== Background ==
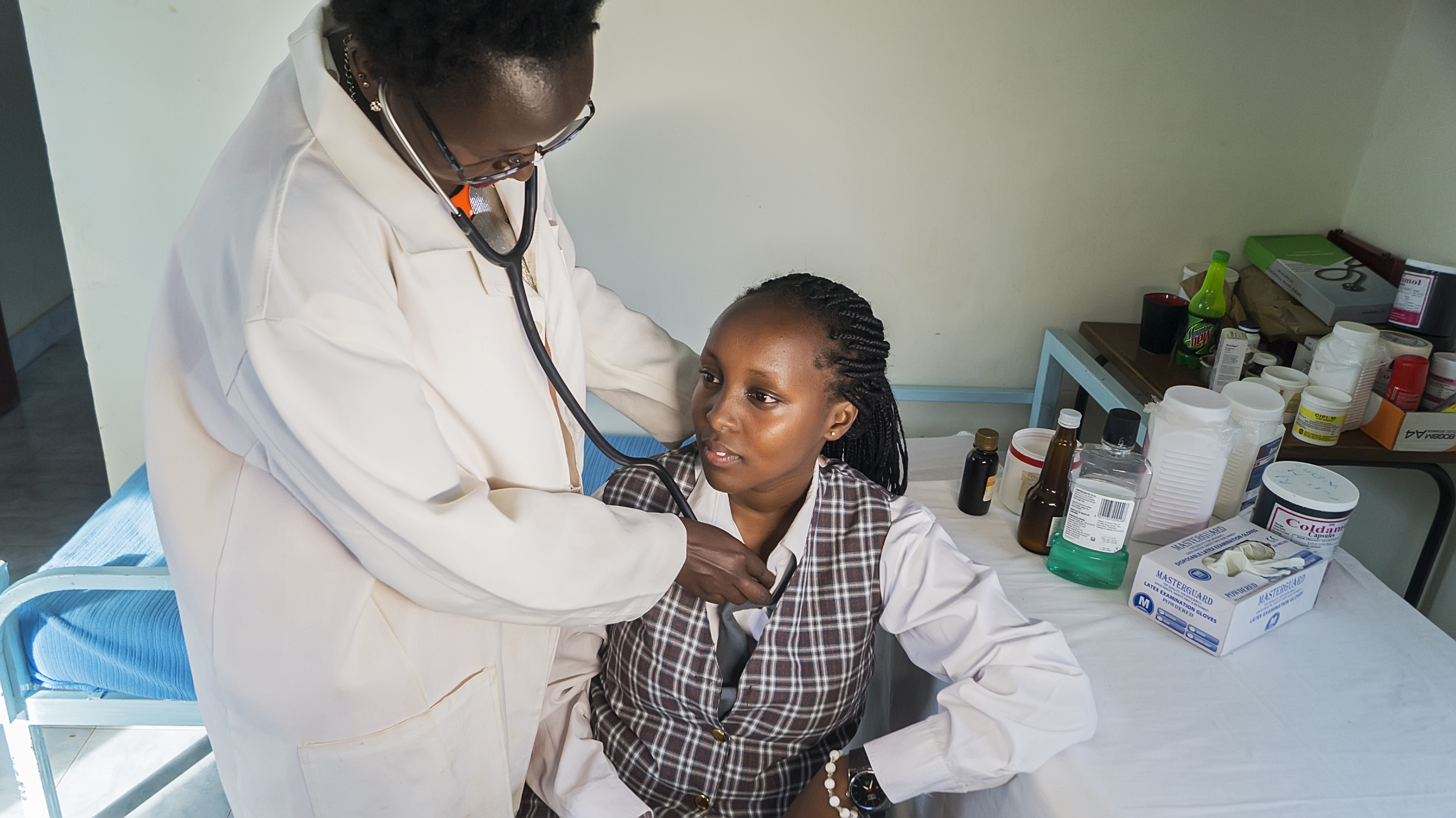
School nurse checks student's health in Kenya.

The UNDP reports that "every 2 seconds, someone aged 30 to 70 years dies prematurely from non-communicable disease, cardiovascular disease, chronic respiratory disease, diabetes or cancer."

According to statistics, globally, "Children face the highest risk of dying in their first month of life at an average global rate of 17 deaths per 1,000 live births in 2024 . . . .In comparison, the probability of dying after the first month and before reaching age 1 was estimated at 10 deaths per 1,000 and the probability of dying after reaching age 1 and before reaching age 5 was estimated at 10 deaths per 1,000 in 2024. Globally, 2.3 million children died in the first month of life in 2024 – approximately 6,300 neonatal deaths every day.". Lack of access to quality healthcare is one of the major factors. Neonatal mortality was highest in sub-Saharan Africa and South Asia, with the neonatal mortality rate estimated at 26 and 22 deaths per 1,000 live births, respectively, in 2024.

Significant steps have been made in increasing life expectancy and reducing some of the common causes of child and maternal mortality. "In 2023, the global under-five mortality rate was half of what it was in 2000 – a remarkable achievement that reflects decades of sustained investment and collaboration by governments, donors, health professionals, communities and families. Still, the journey toward ending all preventable child deaths is far from complete. An estimated 4.8 million children died before reaching their fifth birthday in 2023—overwhelmingly preventable deaths. This includes 2.3 million newborns who died within the first 28 days of life and 2.5 million children aged 1–59 months. Beyond early childhood, an additional 2.1 million children, adolescents and youth aged 5–24 also lost their lives".

== Targets, indicators, and progress ==
The UN has defined 13 Targets and 28 Indicators for SDG 3. The main data source and maps for the indicators for SDG 3 come from Our World in Data's SDG Tracker. The targets of SDG 3 cover a wide range of issues including reduction of maternal mortality (Target 3.1), ending all preventable deaths under five years of age (Target 3.2), fight communicable diseases (Target 3.3), ensure a reduction of mortality from non-communicable diseases and promote mental health (Target 3.4), prevent and treat substance abuse (Target 3.5), reduce road injuries and deaths (Target 3.6), grant universal access to sexual and reproductive health care, family planning and education (Target 3.7), achieve universal health coverage (Target 3.8), reduce illnesses and deaths from hazardous chemicals and pollution (Target 3.9), implement the WHO Framework Convention on Tobacco Control (Target 3.a), support research, development and universal access to affordable vaccines and medicines (Target 3.b), increase health financing and support health workforce in developing countries (Target 3.c) and improve early warning systems for global health risks (Target 3.d).

=== Target 3.1: Reduce maternal mortality ===
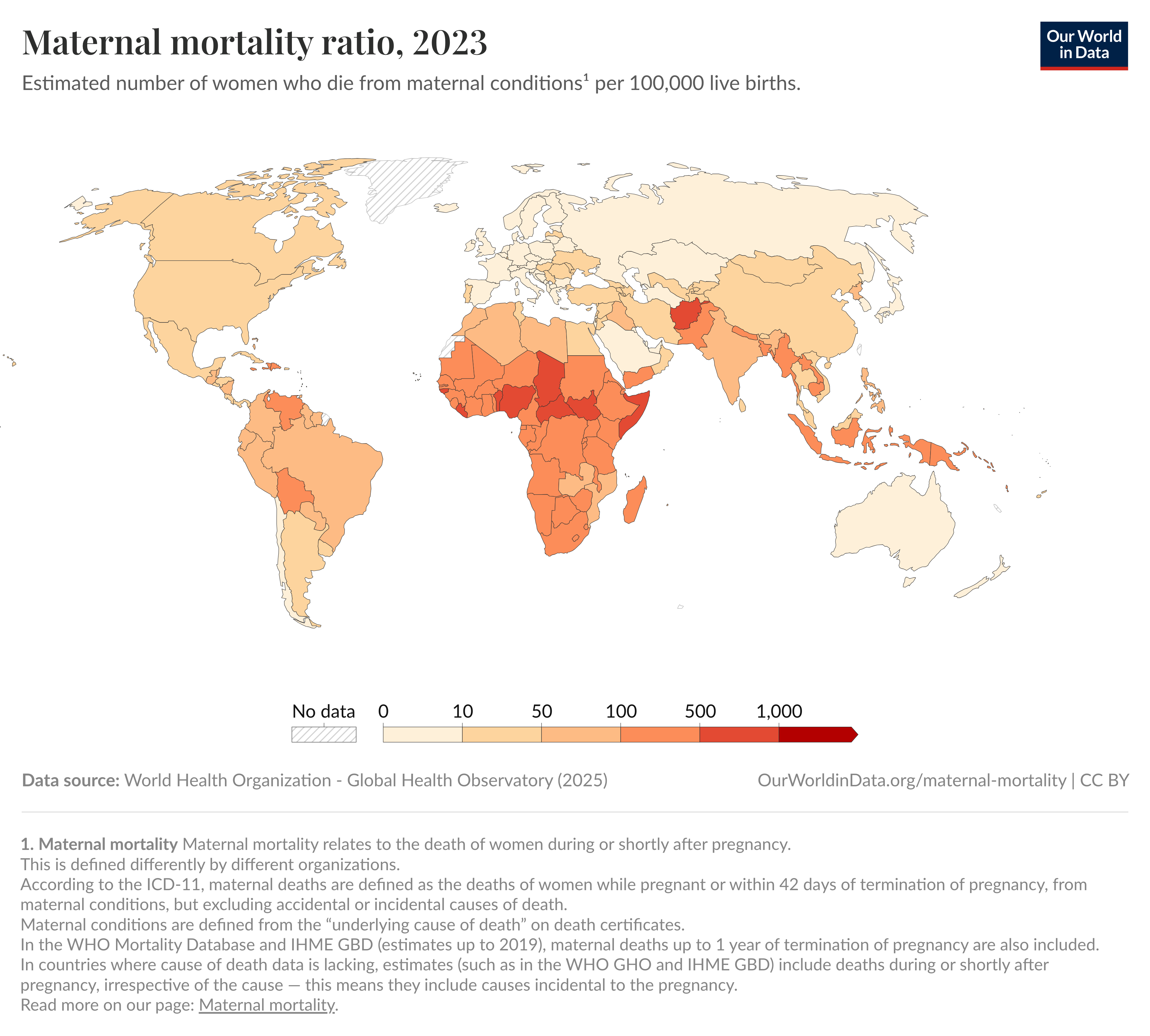
World map for indicator 3.1.1 in 2023 - Maternal mortality ratio

The full text of Target 3.1 is: "By 2030, reduce the global maternal mortality ratio to less than 70 per 100,000 live births".

- Indicator 3.1.1: Maternal mortality ratio. The maternal mortality ratio refers to the number of women who die from pregnancy-related causes while pregnant or within 42 days of pregnancy termination per 100,000 live births.
- Indicator 3.1.2: Percentage of births attended by personnel trained to give the necessary supervision, care, and advice to women during pregnancy, labour, and the postpartum period; to conduct deliveries on their own; and to care for new-borns

Target 3.1 aims to reduce maternal mortality to less than 70 deaths per 100,000 live births. Maternal mortality ratio declined by 40 percent between 2000 and 2023, there were approximately 260,000 maternal deaths worldwide in 2023, most from preventable causes. In 2015, maternal health conditions were also the leading cause of death among girls aged 15–19. Key strategies for meeting SDG 3 will be to reduce adolescent pregnancy (which is strongly linked to gender equality), provide better data for all women and girls, and achieve universal coverage of skilled birth attendants.

=== Target 3.2: End all preventable deaths under five years of age ===
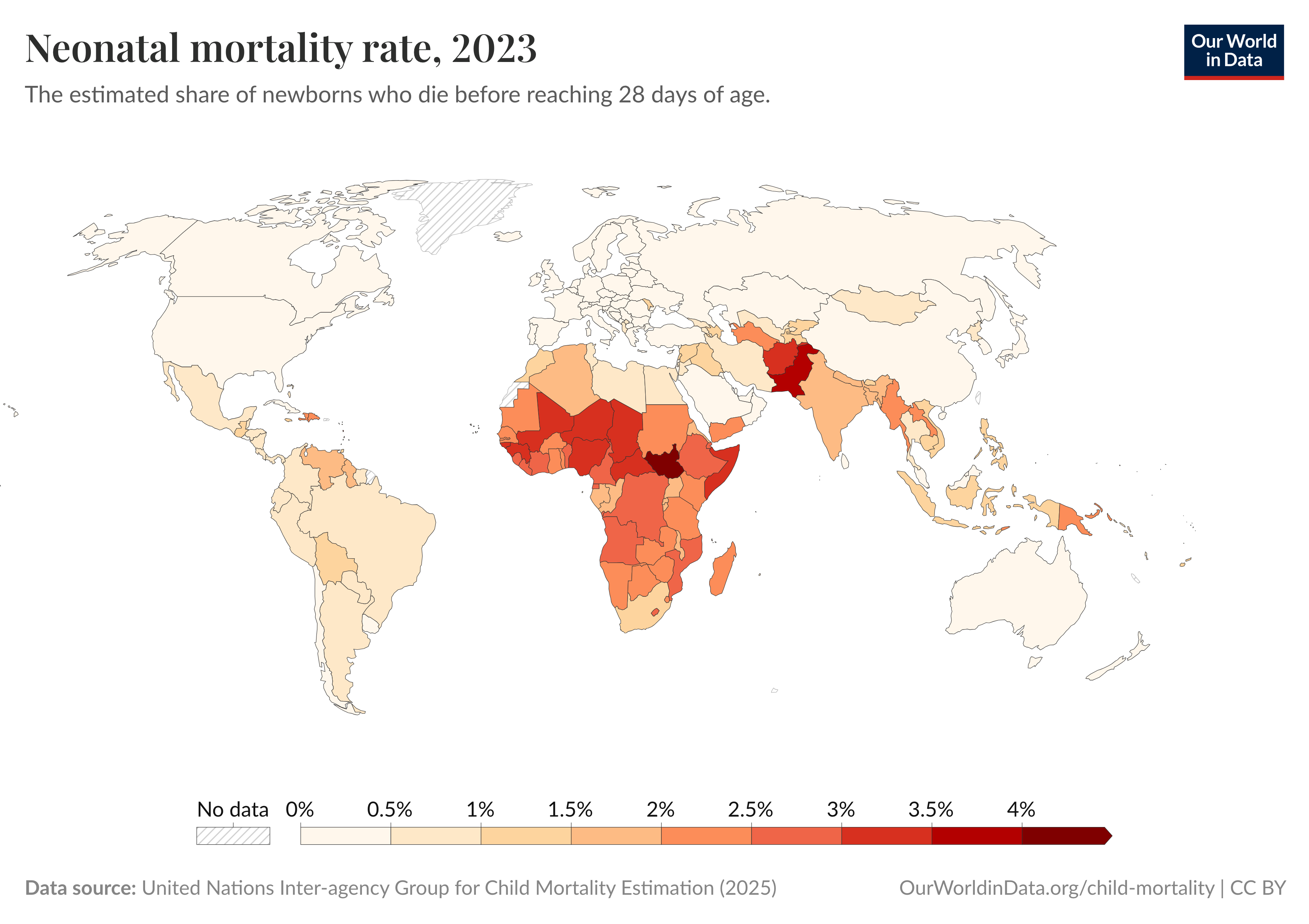
World map for indicator 3.2.2 in 2023 - Neonatal mortality rate

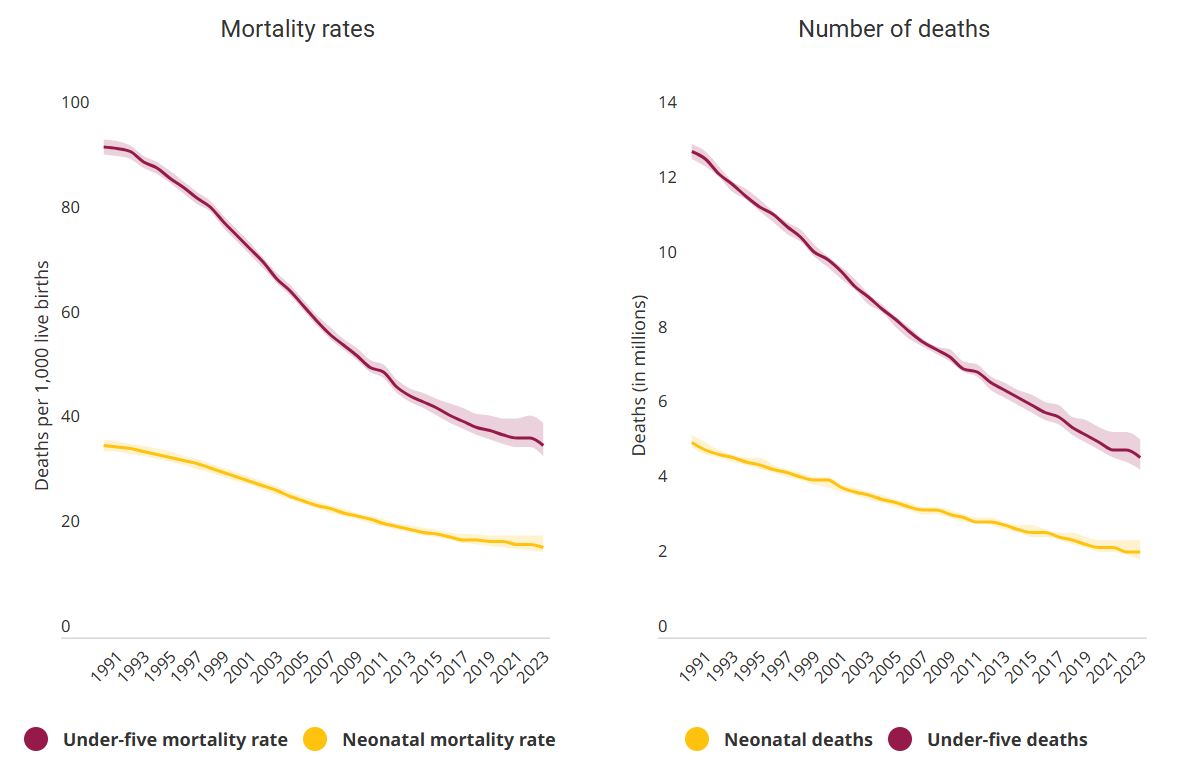
Trends in neonatal mortality rate and number of deaths from 1991 to 2023

The full text of Target 3.2 is: "By 2030, end preventable deaths of newborns and children under five years of age, with all countries aiming to reduce neonatal mortality to at least as low as 12 per 1,000 live births and under‑five mortality to at least as low as 25 per 1,000 live births."

- Indicator 3.2.1: Under-five mortality rate. The under-five mortality rate measures the number of children per 1,000 live births who die before their fifth birthday.
- Indicator 3.2.2: Neonatal mortality rate. The neonatal mortality rate is defined as the share of newborns per 1,000 live births in a given year who die before reaching 28 days of age.

The overall decline in under-five mortality is promising, but progress has not been as good across all age groups. Since 2000, deaths among children aged 1–59 months have fallen by 58 per cent, compared to a 44 per cent decline in neonatal deaths. Nearly half of all under-five deaths in 2023 occurred within the first 28 days of life. This shows the need for more investment in targeted interventions in this vulnerable age group.

Improving antenatal care programs could reduce the neonatal mortality rate.

=== Target 3.3: Fight communicable diseases ===
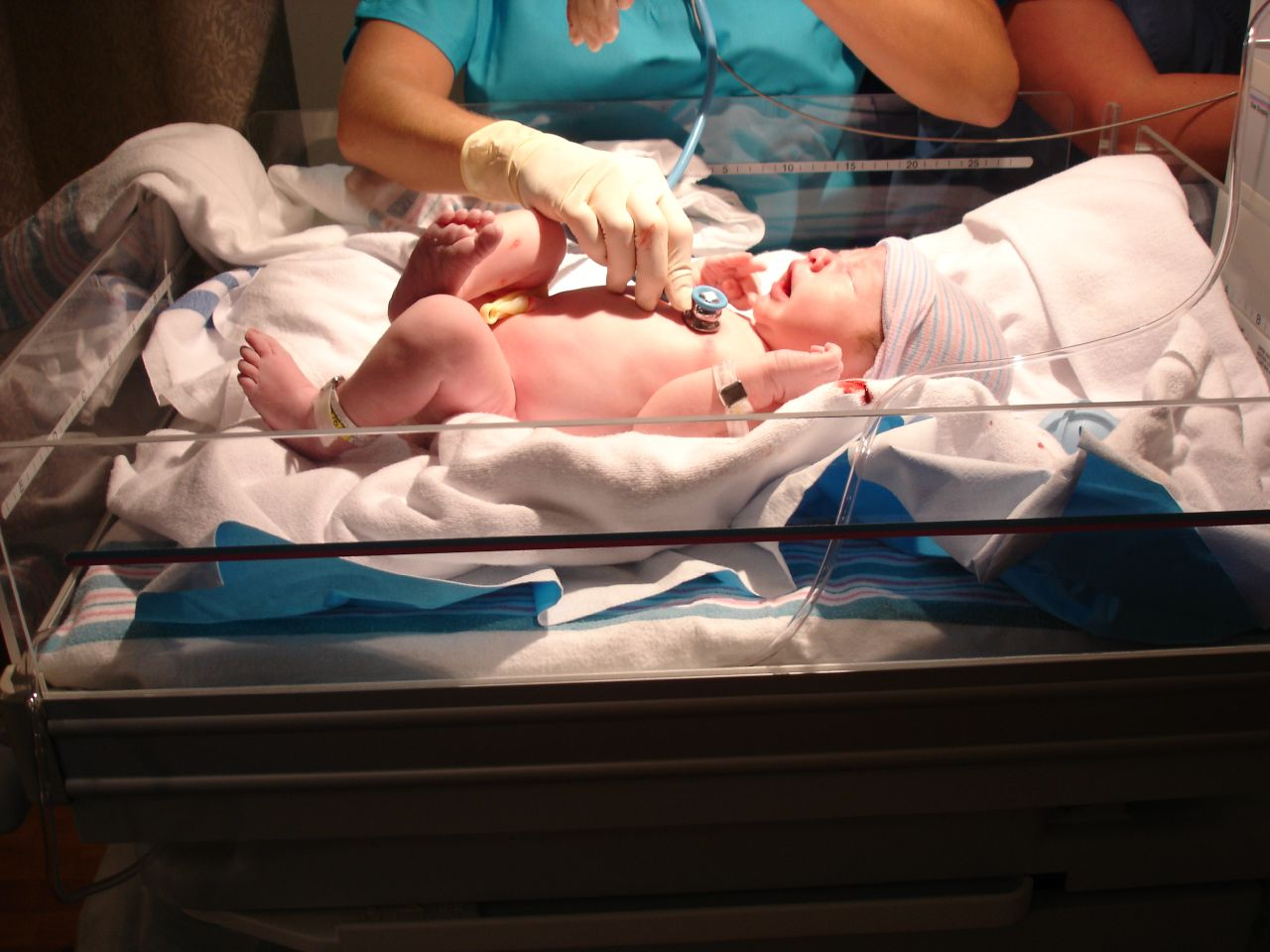
Newborn checkup - The nurse is checking the newborn.

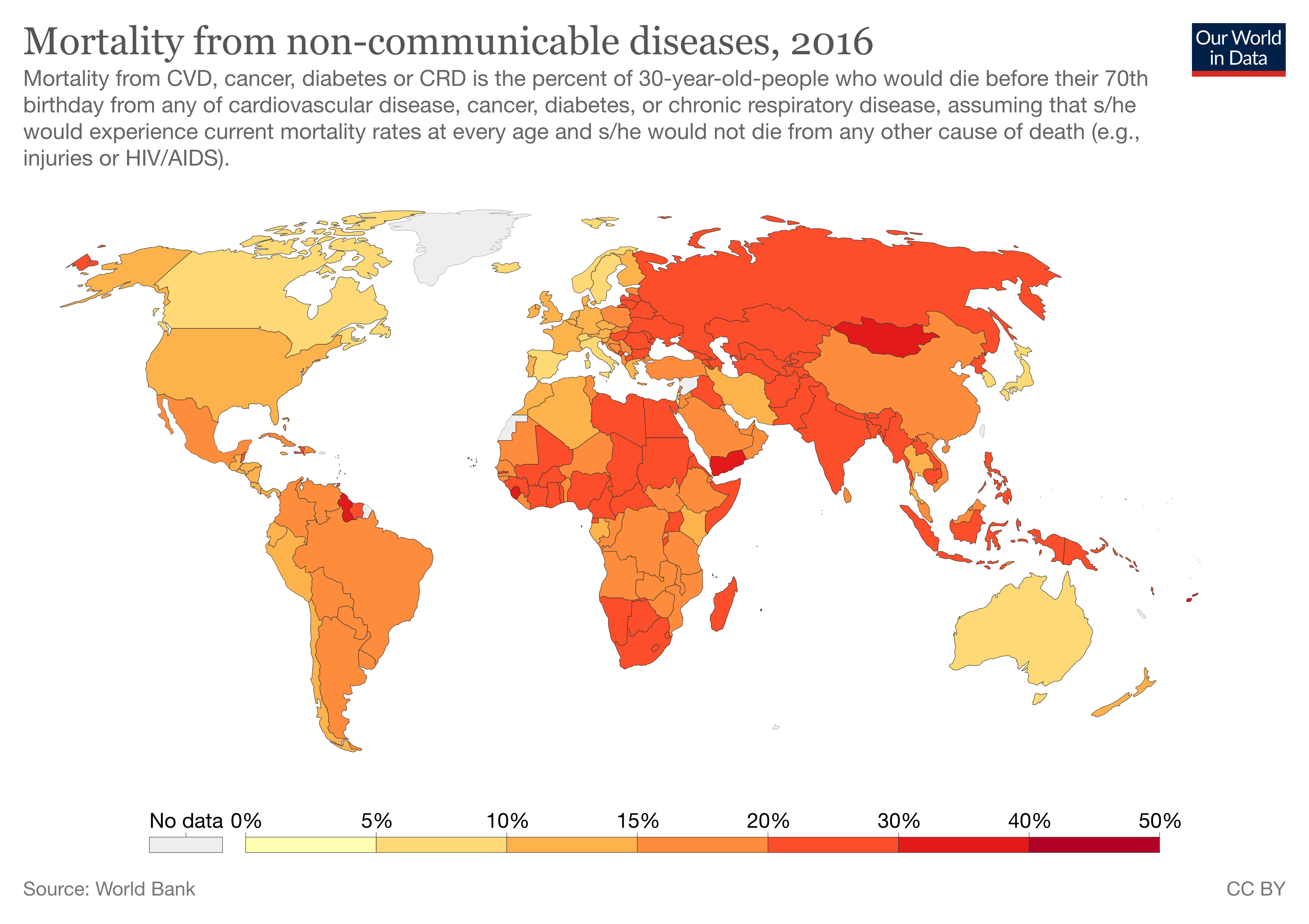
World map for indicator 3.4.1 in 2016 - Mortality rate from CVD, Cancer, Diabetes or CRD Between Exact ages 30 and 70 (%)

The full text of Target 3.3 is: "By 2030, end the epidemics of AIDS, tuberculosis, malaria and neglected tropical diseases and combat hepatitis, water-borne diseases and other communicable diseases."

- Indicator 3.3.1: Number of new HIV infections per 1,000 uninfected population
- Indicator 3.3.2: Tuberculosis per 100,000 population
- Indicator 3.3.3: Malaria incidence per 1,000 population
- Indicator 3.3.4: Hepatitis B incidence per 100,000 population
- Indicator 3.3.5: Number of people requiring interventions against neglected tropical disease

Target 3.3 proposes to end the preventable death of newborns and children under five and to end epidemics such as AIDS, tuberculosis, malaria, and water-borne diseases, for example.

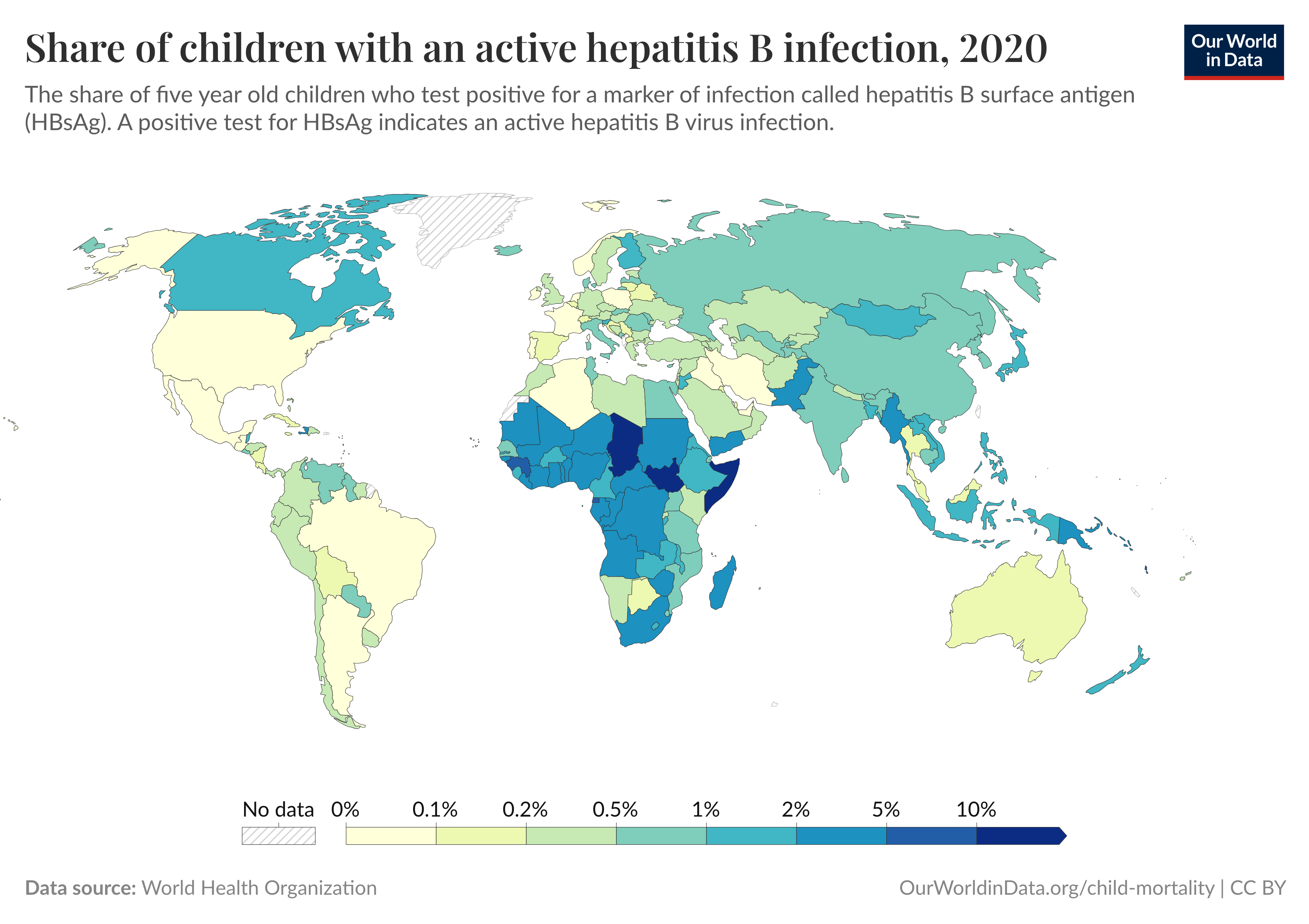
World map for Indicator 3.3.4 in 2020 - Hepatitis B incidence

From 2000 to 2024, new HIV infections declined by 78 percent for children under 15 and by 63 percent among adolescents aged 15–19.

In 2023, there were about 134 tuberculosis cases per 100,000 population.

=== Target 3.4: Reduce mortality from non-communicable diseases and promote mental health ===
The full text of Target 3.4 is: "By 2030, reduce by one-third premature mortality from non-communicable diseases through prevention and treatment and promote mental health and well-being."

- Indicator 3.4.1: Mortality rate attributed to cardiovascular disease, cancer, diabetes or chronic respiratory disease
- Indicator 3.4.2: Suicide mortality rate

In 2021, deaths caused by the four main NCDs were 19 million from cardiovascular diseases, 10 million from cancers, 4.0 million from chronic respiratory diseases, and over 2.0 million from diabetes.

=== Target 3.5: Prevent and treat substance abuse ===
The full text of Target 3.5 is: "Strengthen the prevention and treatment of substance abuse, including narcotic drug abuse and harmful use of alcohol."

- Indicator 3.5.1: Coverage of treatment interventions (pharmacological, psychosocial and rehabilitation and aftercare services) for substance use disorders
- Indicator 3.5.2: Harmful use of alcohol, defined according to the national context as alcohol per capita consumption (aged 15 years and older) within a calendar year in litres of pure alcohol.

World map for indicator 3.6.1 in 2021 - Death rate due to road traffic injuries in 2021

=== Target 3.6: Reduce road injuries and deaths ===
The full text of Target 3.6 is: "halving the global number of deaths and injuries from road traffic crashes by 2030."

Target 3.6 has only one Indicator: Indicator 3.6.1 is the Death rate due to road traffic injuries.

The need for improvements in safer infrastructure and government regulation continues. In countries with great success, such as Sweden that boasts a 66 percent reduction in injury and deaths from 1990 to 2015, tough government regulation has been key.

A Decade of Action for Road Safety 2011-2020 was declared in March 2010 by the United Nations General Assembly. In February 2020, the Stockholm Declaration that set a global target of reducing road traffic deaths and injuries by 50 percent by 2030. In August 2020, the United Nations ratified the Stockholm Declaration declaring 2021–2030 the Second Decade of action for Road Safety.

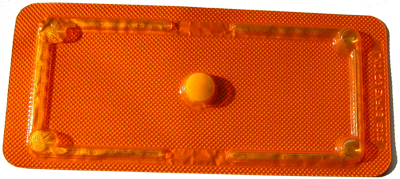
Emergency contraception pill

=== Target 3.7: Universal access to sexual and reproductive care, family planning and education ===
The full text of Target 3.7 is: "By 2030, ensure universal access to sexual and reproductive health-care services, including for family planning, information and education, and the integration of reproductive health into national strategies and programs."

- Indicator 3.7.1: Percentage of married women ages 15–49 years whose need for family planning is satisfied with modern methods of contraception.
- Indicator 3.7.2: Adolescent birth rate (aged 10–14 years; aged 15–19 years) per 1,000 women in that age group.

For example, in Sub‑Saharan Africa, modern contraceptive use among married women or women in a partnership has increased from about 29 percent in 2015 to 34 percent in 2023.

Lianne Gonsalves of the Department of Sexual and Reproductive Health and Research at the World Health Organization (WHO) has led a report linking their sexual and reproductive health work to this UN target.

=== Target 3.8: Achieve universal health coverage ===
The full text of Target 3.8 is: "Achieve universal health coverage, including financial risk protection, access to quality essential health-care services and access to safe, effective, quality and affordable essential medicines and vaccines for all."

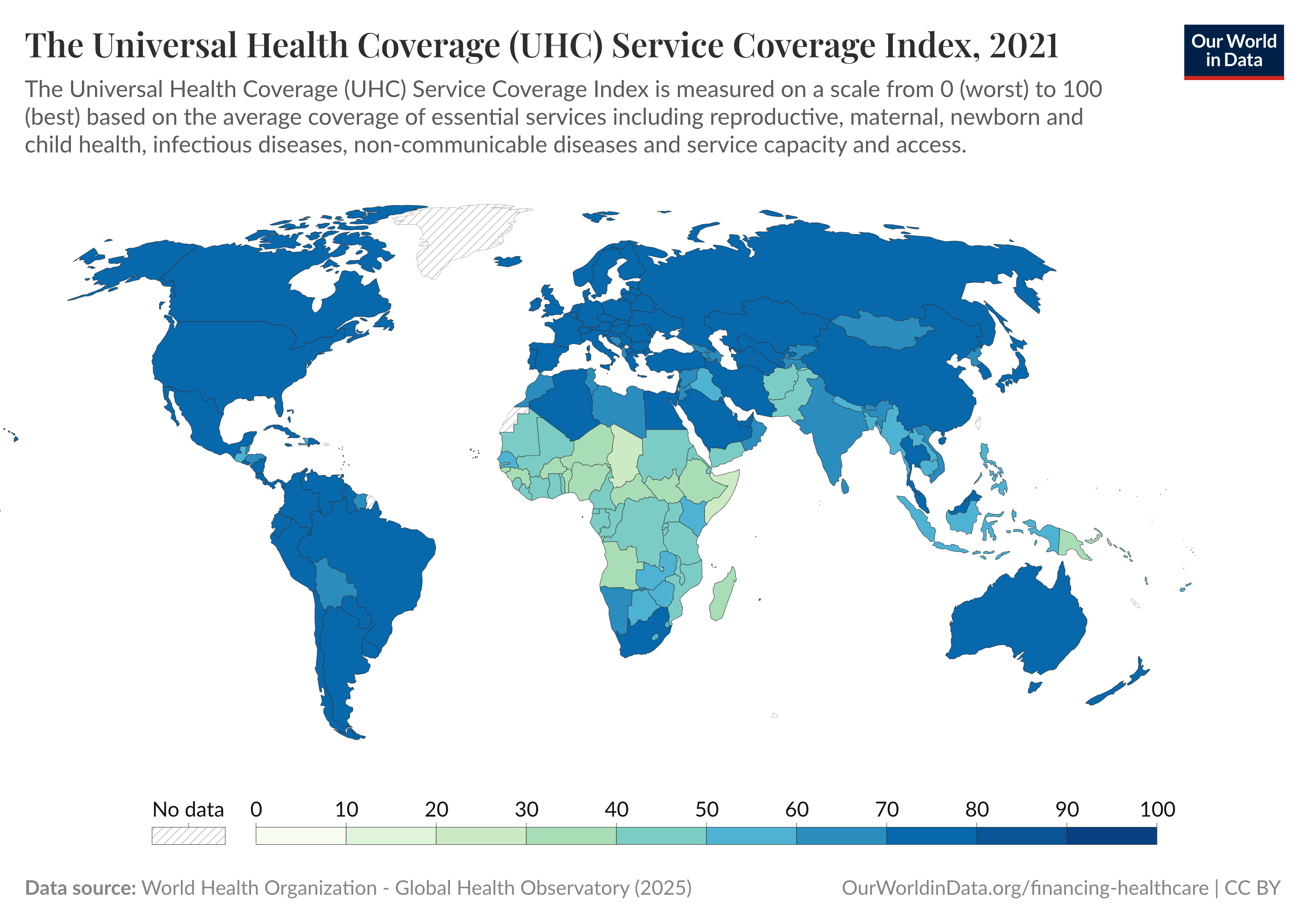
The Universal Healthcare Coverage (UHC) Index, 2021

- Indicator 3.8.1: Coverage of essential health services.
- Indicator 3.8.2: Proportion of population with large household expenditures on health as a share of total household expenditure or income

Indicator 3.8.1 is based on 14 tracer metrics classified into four categories. They are: (1) reproductive, maternal, newborn and child health, (2) infectious diseases, (3) noncommunicable diseases, and (4) service capacity and access. The tracer metrics measure the availability of each of these health services.

The WHO is the main custodian for indicator 3.8.1, compiling the data from national Ministries of Health and National Statistical Offices.

The progress towards universal coverage remains inconsistent. There have been challenges in terms of both service coverage and financial protection against risks.

Universal Health Coverage (UHC) includes migrants and refugees, even if they do not have legal status.

Primary health care (PHC) is important for universal health coverage. It is usually accessible and affordable.

=== Target 3.9: Reduce illnesses and deaths from hazardous chemicals and pollution ===
The full text of Target 3.9 is: "By 2030, substantially reduce the number of deaths and illnesses from hazardous chemicals and air, water and soil pollution and contamination."

- Indicator 3.9.1: Mortality rate attributed to the household (indoor) and ambient (outdoor) air pollution.
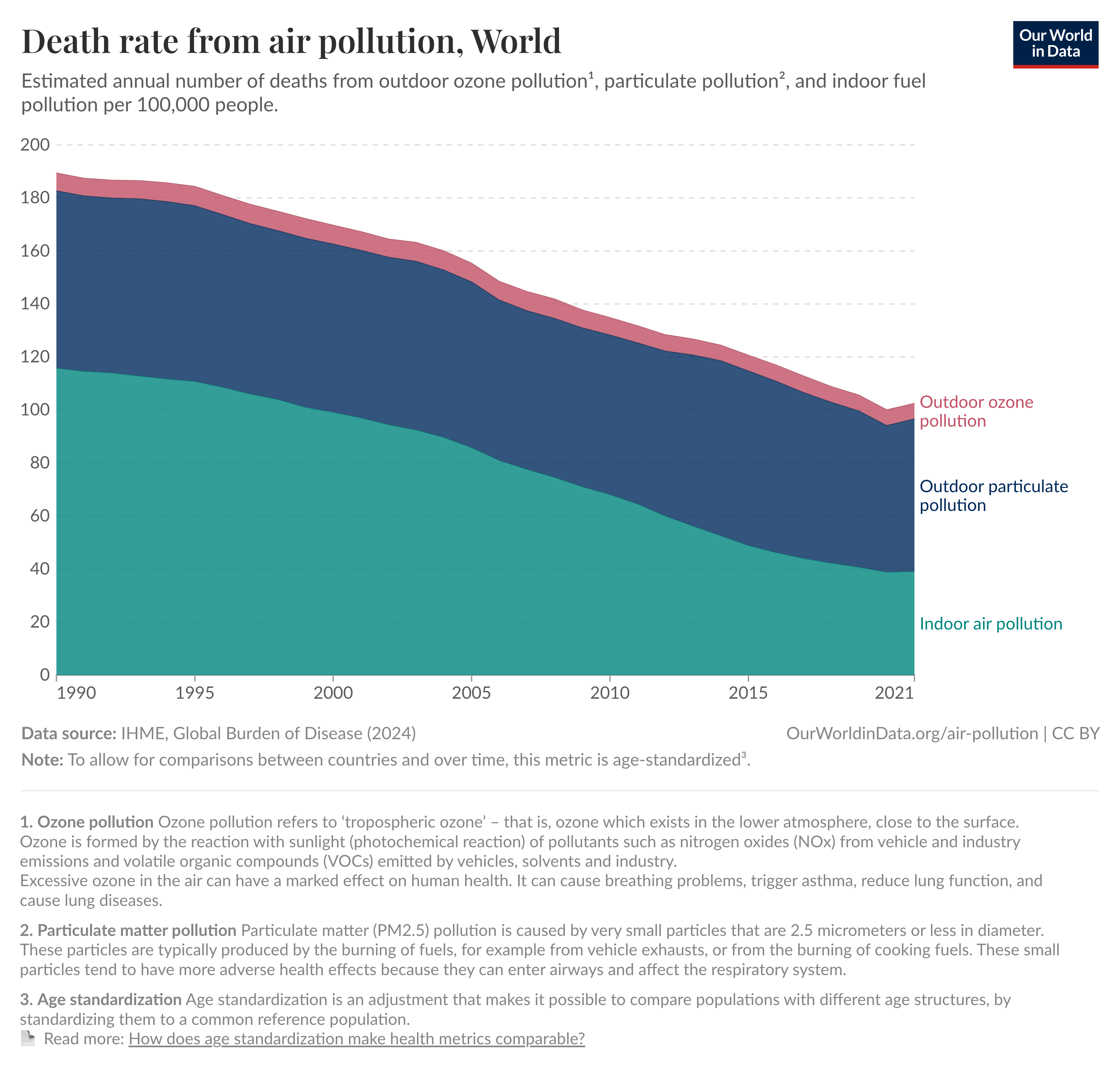
  Estimated annual number of deaths from outdoor ozone pollution, particulate pollution, and indoor fuel pollution per 100,000 people
- Indicator 3.9.2: Mortality rate attributed to unsafe water and, sanitation, and lack of hygiene.
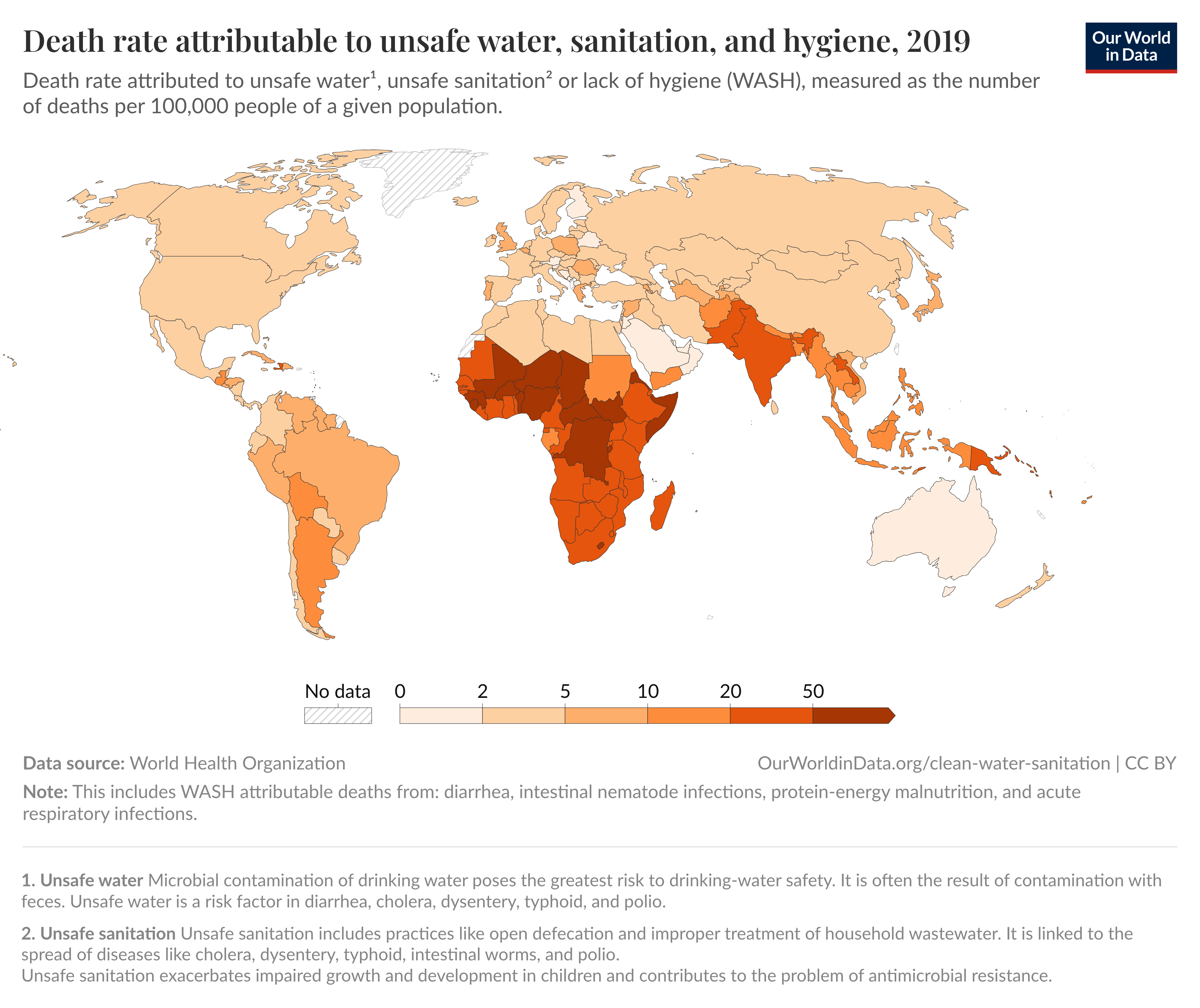
  Death rate attributed to unsafe water, unsafe sanitation or lack of hygiene (WASH), measured as the number of deaths per 100,000 people of a given population
- Indicator 3.9.3: Mortality rate attributed to unintentional poisoning.
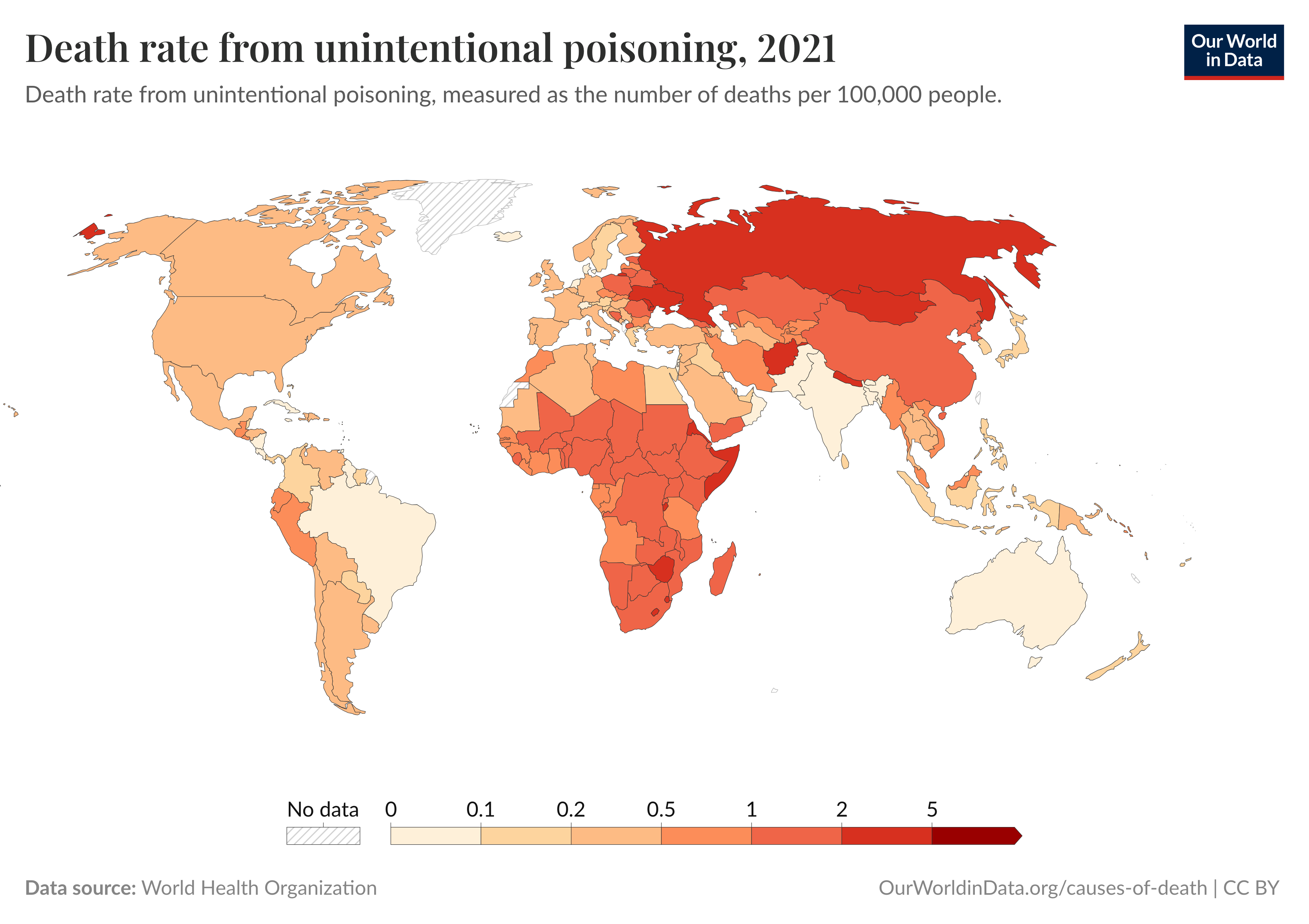
  Death rate from unintentional poisoning, measured as the number of deaths per 100,000 people

The WHO is the main custodian for indicators 3.9.1-3.9.3. Data is collected from national Ministries of Health for indicator 3.9.1. Indicators 3.9.2 and 3.9.3 use databases containing medical certifications with causes of death.

Household air pollution is estimated to cause half of all pneumonia deaths among children under age five.

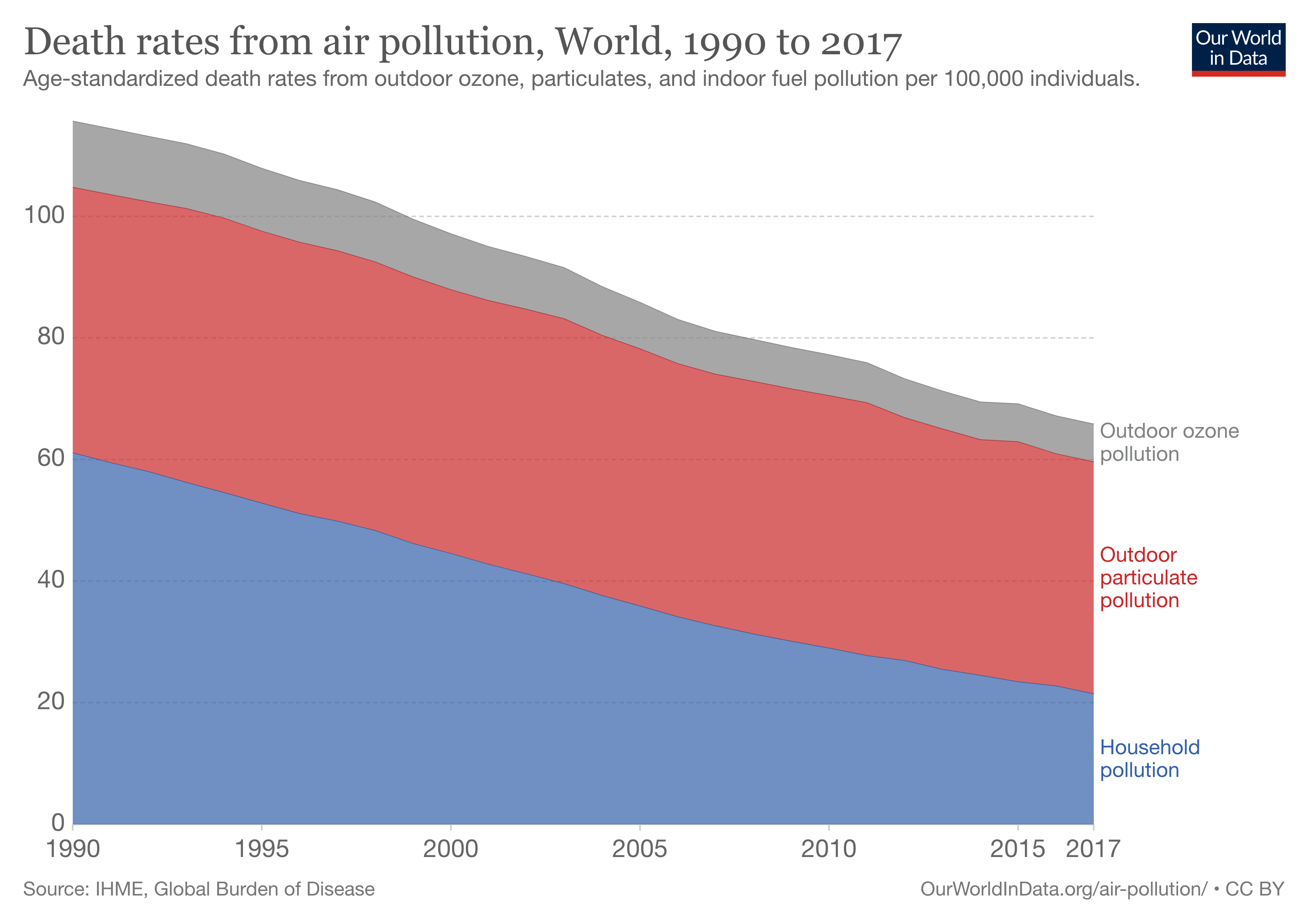
Deaths - ambient ozone pollution - sex: both - age-standardized (rate)

=== Target 3.a: Implement the WHO framework convention on tobacco control ===
The full text of Target 3.a is: "Strengthen the implementation of the World Health Organization Framework Convention on Tobacco Control in all countries, as appropriate."

Target 3.a has only one Indicator: Indicator 3.a.1 is the "age-standardized prevalence of current tobacco use among persons aged 15 years and older".

The WHO Framework Convention on Tobacco Control has been ratified by the great majority of countries (180 countries). The WHO Tobacco Free Initiative, Secretariat of the WHO Framework Convention on Tobacco Control and the Protocol to Eliminate Illicit Trade in Tobacco Products is the main custodian for indicator 3.a.1. WHO member states and party states to the Framework Convention on Tobacco Control provide data.

In 2019 the global average value for the "age-standardized smoking prevalence among ages 15 and older" was 17%, down from nearly 25% in 1990, which is a positive development.

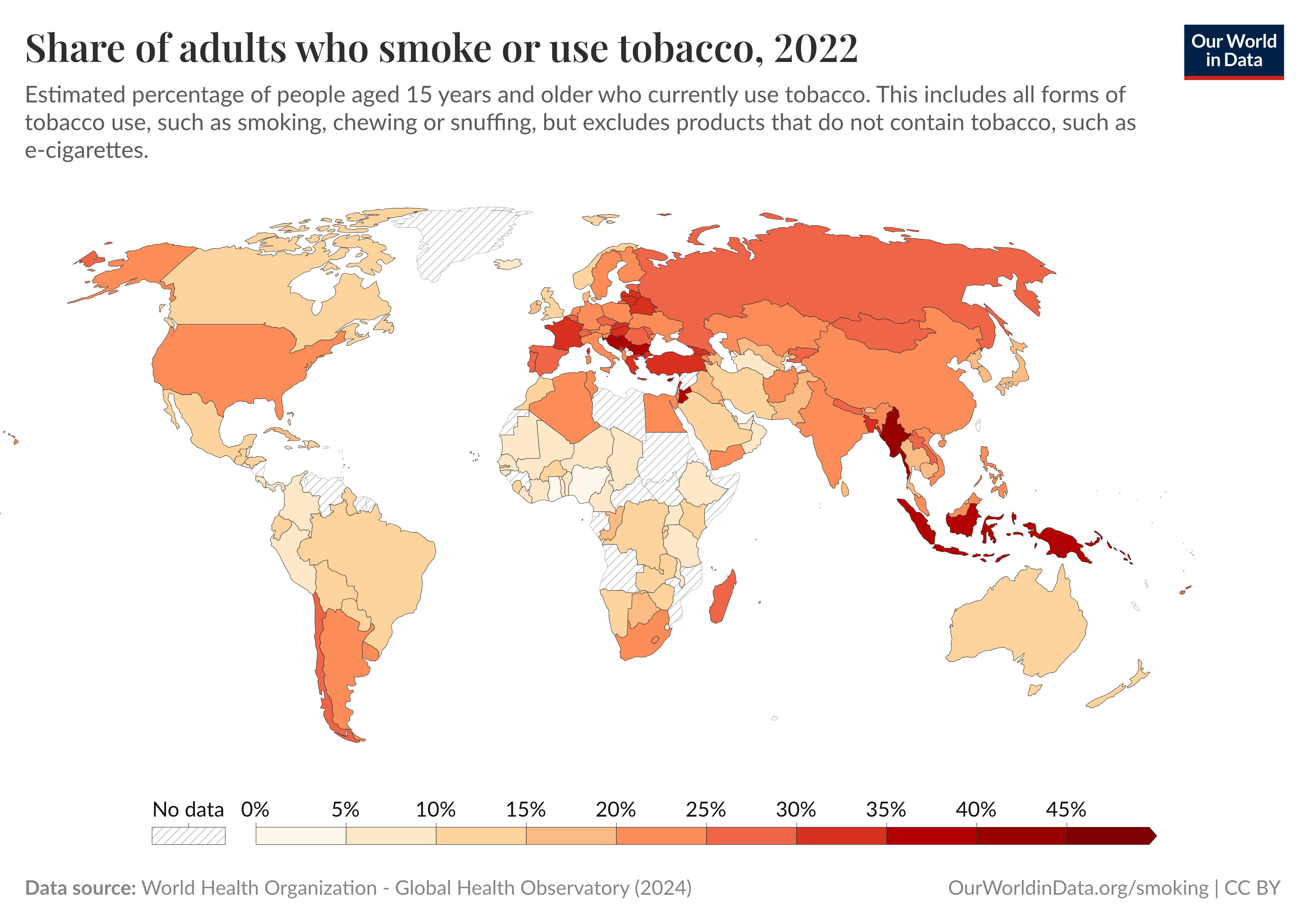
Estimated percentage of people aged 15 years and older who currently use tobacco. This includes all forms of tobacco use, such as smoking, chewing or snuffing, but excludes products that do not contain tobacco, such as e-cigarettes.

=== Target 3.b: Support research, development and universal access to affordable vaccines and medicines ===
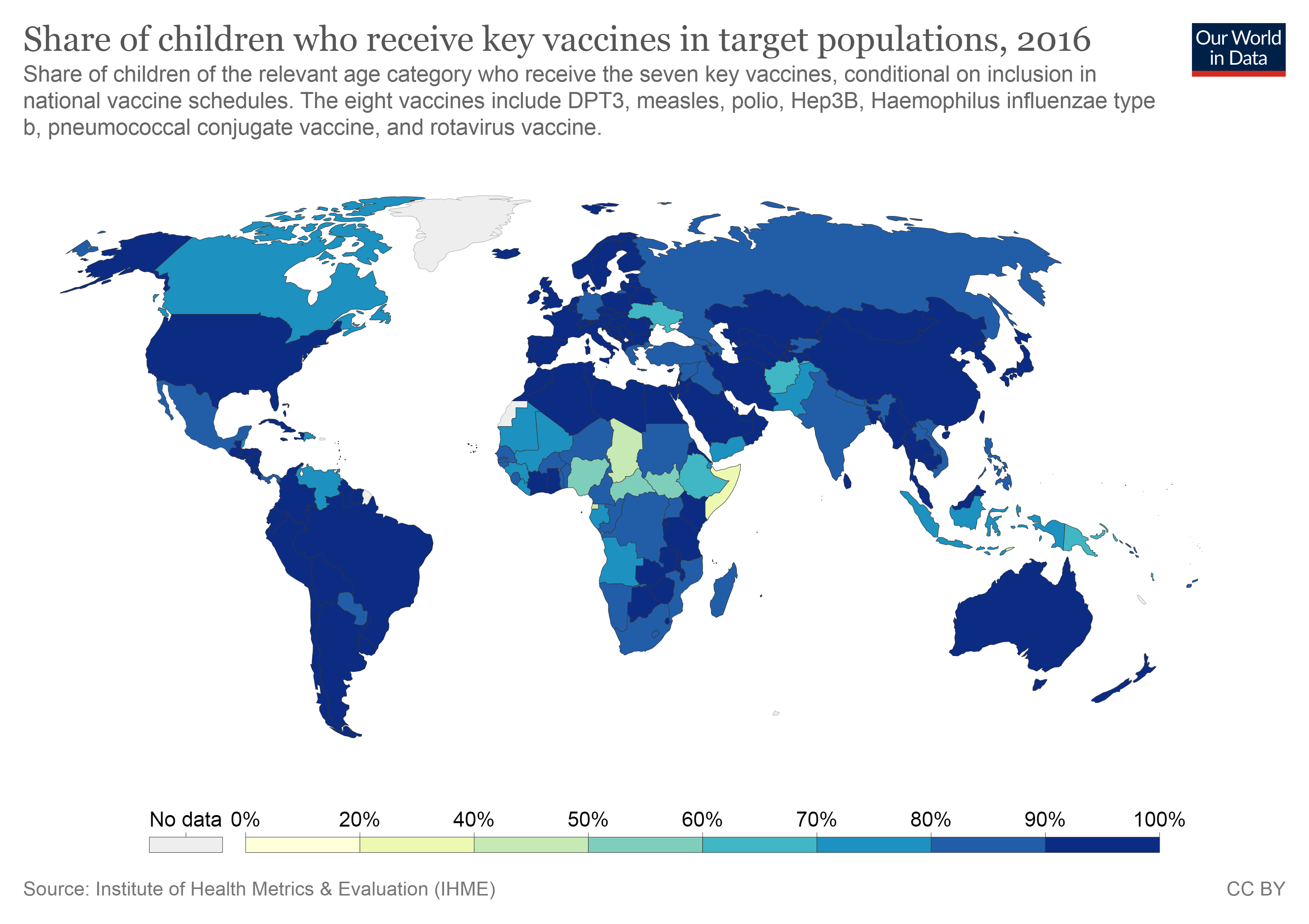
World Map for Indicator 3.b.1 - Share of children who receive key vaccines in target populations

The full text of Target 3.b is: "Support the research and development of vaccines and medicines for the communicable and non‑communicable diseases that primarily affect developing countries, provide access to affordable essential medicines and vaccines, in accordance with the Doha Declaration on the TRIPS Agreement and Public Health, which affirms the right of developing countries to use to the full the provisions in the Agreement on Trade-Related Aspects of Intellectual Property Rights regarding flexibilities to protect public health, and, in particular, provide access to medicines for all."

- Indicator 3.b.1: Proportion of the target population covered by all vaccines included in their national program.
- Indicator 3.b.2: Total net official development assistance (ODA) to medical research and basic health sectors.
- Indicator 3.b.3: Proportion of health facilities that have a core set of relevant essential medicines available and affordable on a sustainable basis.

Three organizations share custody of the indicators for target 3.b: the WHO and UNICEF for 3.b.1, OECD for 3.b.2, and the WHO for 3.b.3.

A review in 2017 pointed out that "as little as 1% of all funding for health R&D is allocated to diseases that are predominantly incident in developing countries".

SDG 3 aims to achieve universal health coverage, including access to essential medicines and vaccines. Around two in five countries will need to accelerate progress in order to reach SDG targets for immunization. Immunization averts an estimated 2 million to 3 million deaths every year.

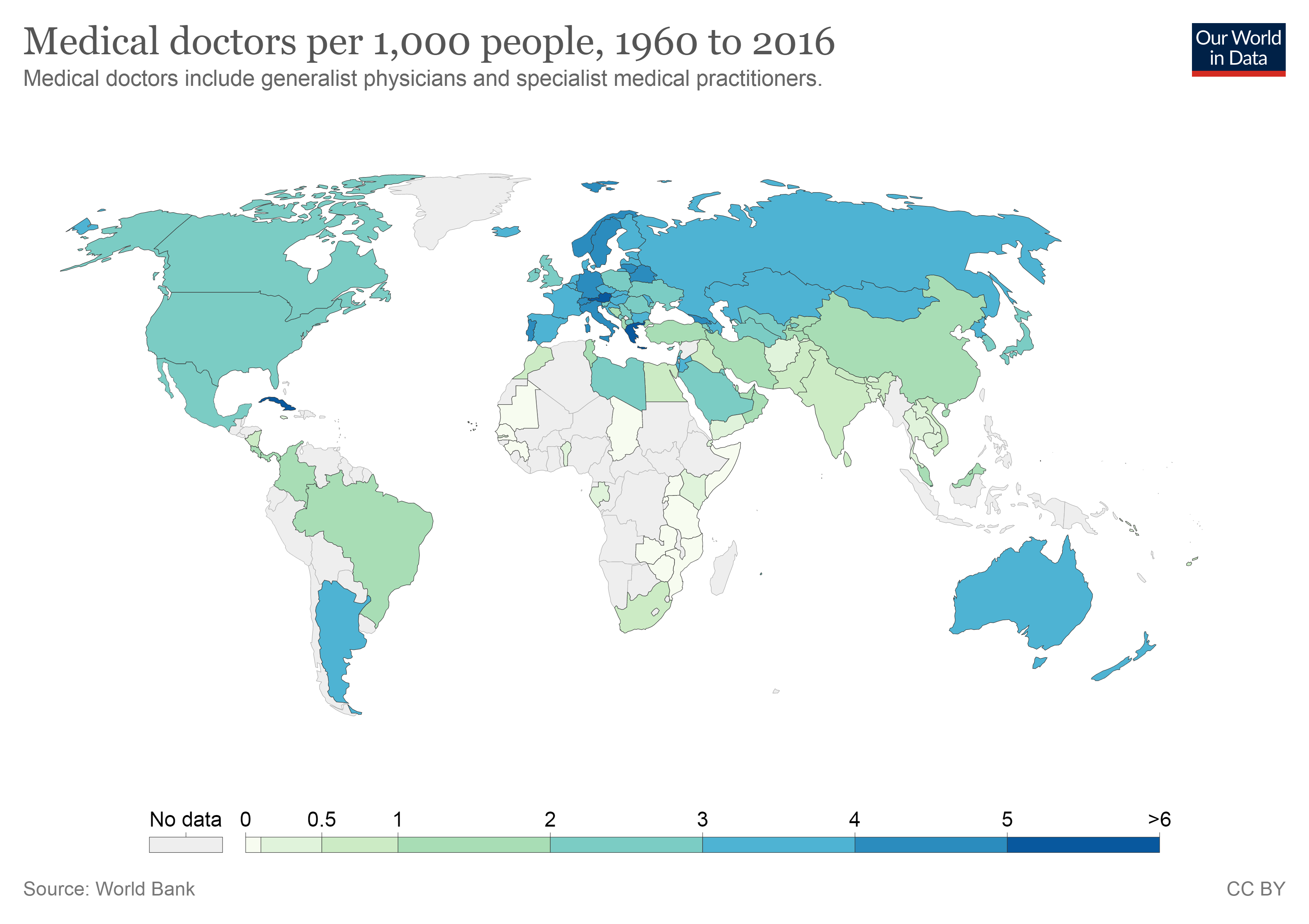
World map for indicator 3.c.1 in 2016 - Health worker density and distribution

=== Target 3.c: Increase health financing and support health workforce in developing countries ===
The full text of Target 3.c is: "Substantially increase health financing and the recruitment, development, training and retention of the health workforce in developing countries, especially in the least developed countries and small island developing states."

Target 3.c has only one Indicator: Indicator 3.c.1 is the Health worker density and distribution. The WHO is in custody of indicator 3.c.1. The National Health Workforce Accounts, published by the WHO in 2017, provides national-level data for the indicator.

The WHO predicts that there will be a shortage of 11 million health personnel by the year 2030, especially in low- and middle-income countries.

There is a joint ITU/WHO initiative "Be Healthy Be Mobile" which brings mobile health services to scale.

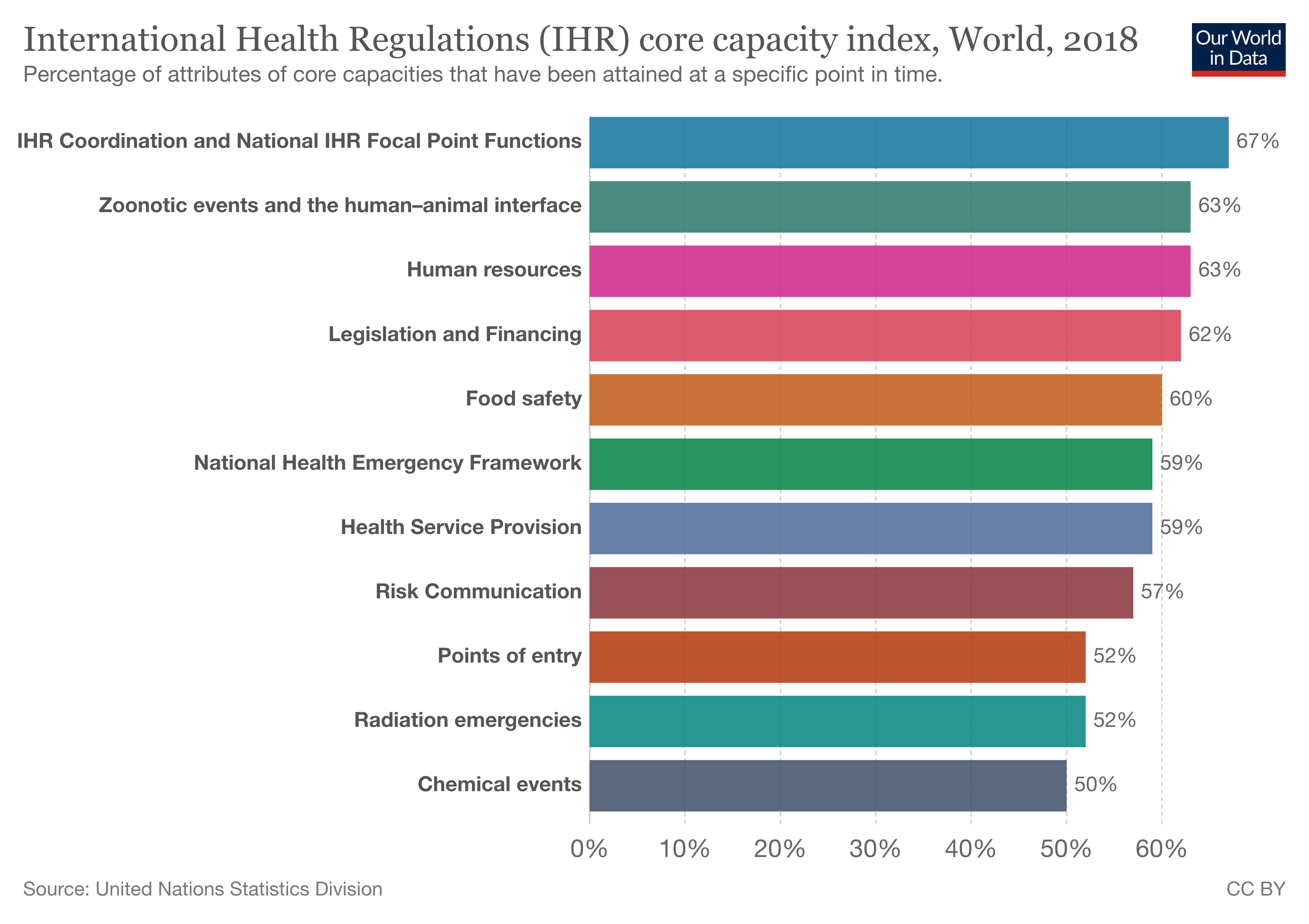
International health regulations (IHR) capacity, by the type of IHR capacity (%) - SH_IHR_CAPS - laboratory

=== Target 3.d: Improve early warning systems for global health risks ===
The full text of Target 3.d is: "Strengthen the capacity of all countries, in particular developing countries, for early warning, risk reduction and management of national and global health risks."

- Indicator 3.d.1: International Health Regulations (IHR) capacity and health emergency preparedness
- Indicator 3.d.2: Percentage of bloodstream infections due to selected antimicrobial resistant organisms.
- Indicator 3.d.3, Proportion of health facilities that have a core set of relevant essential medicines available and affordable on a sustainable basis (where antibiotics will be disaggregated from the core set of data used in the metadata).

Both indicators 3.d.1 and 3.d.2 are in custody of the WHO. The data is collected from member states and their Ministries of Health.

=== Custodian agencies ===
There are six custodian agencies for the 28 indicators of SDG 3. The World Health Organization (WHO) is the main custodian for SDG 3 indicators, being the custodian for 20 out of 28 indicators. This means that the WHO is the dominant custodian agency for this SDG.

The other five custodians for SDG 3 indicators, other than WHO, are:

- UN Children's Fund (UNICEF) (four indicators),
- Population Division of the UN Department of Economic and Social Affairs (Indicators 3.7.1 and 3.7.2),
- Joint United Nations Programme on HIV/AIDS (Indicator 3.3.1),
- Organisation for Economic Cooperation and Development (OECD) (Indicator 3.b.2) and
- United Nations Office on Drugs and Crime (Indicator 3.5.1).

== Monitoring progress ==
An annual report is prepared by the Secretary-General of the United Nations evaluating the progress towards the Sustainable Development Goals.

A 2018 study in the journal Nature found that while "nearly all African countries demonstrated improvements for children under 5 years old for stunting, wasting, and underweight... much, if not all of the continent will fail to meet the Sustainable Development Goal target—to end malnutrition by 2030".

== Challenges ==
=== Impact of COVID-19 pandemic ===
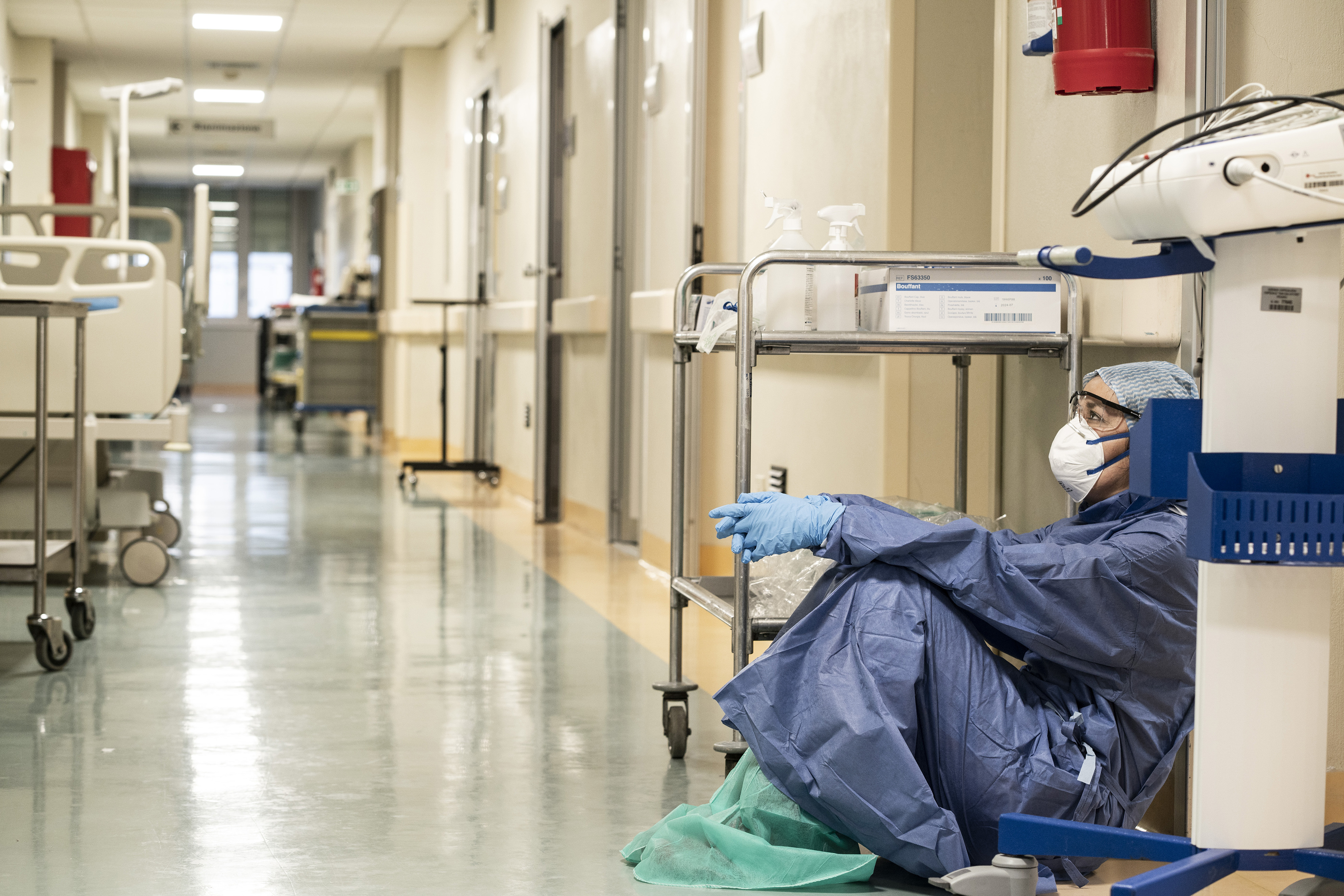
Italian hospital staff of the San Salvatore Hospital in Pesaro, Italy, during COVID-19 pandemic

The COVID-19 pandemic is a serious threat to the progress of SDG 3 aimed to ensure healthy lives and well-being for all. As the pandemic spread worldwide, the lockdown had over 70 countries putting a hold on various health services such as child vaccination, family planning, and cancer screening. The pandemic also led to overloading and overcrowding of health facilities, and many people became afraid of visiting for fear of being infected.

Responses to most non-COVID-19 diseases were either neglected or interrupted during the pandemic, and healthcare systems were in turn stretched beyond their capacity to provide adequate care. This reversed decades of improvement, and has reiterated the need for governments to prioritize issues of healthy living and well-being and work towards the goal of SDG 3.

The governments of countries who already suffer from health worker shortages and other healthcare system strains can take advantage of the lessons learnt during this crisis to build their resilience against future health pandemics.

=== Health financing ===
Health expenditure per capita by country in 2024

Insufficient financing is another big problem in achieving SDG 3. Limited and unstable funding can diminish essential health support, slow the integration of new technologies and life-saving services. These deficiencies also make it more difficult for people to access healthcare.

In most low- and middle-income countries, the government does not have enough funding for providing basic health services. To reach the goal of SDG 3 by the year 2030, $274 billion extra annually is required by 67 low- and middle-income countries.

== Links with other SDGs ==
Healthy lives and well-being are influenced by social, environmental, and other financial factors. Therefore, while SDG 3is set as an individual goal, this targets of SDG 3 link to targets in other goals, for instance to SDG 2, SDG 4, SDG 5, and SDG 6.

=== SDG 2: Zero Hunger ===
Lack of food supplication leads to malnutrition and illness. Rather, the access to food allows people to be healthy and seek a better life condition.

=== SDG4: Ensure inclusive and equitable quality education and promote lifelong learning opportunities for all ===
Education brings an opportunity to overcome poverty by obtaining jobs, which correspondingly provides life-long health and well-being such as safe housing, water, and sanitation. It is necessary to focus on the other factors which inhibit equal access to education such as barriers based on gender, ethnicity, or nationalities to achieve this goal.

=== SDG 5: Achieve gender equality and empower all women and girls ===
Gender equality allows students to accomplish their necessary education and find the opportunity to get jobs for their life-long health. With higher quality of medication, sanitation, justice of the improvements for woman's health, it is expected that violation and discrimination against women will be reduced.

=== SDG 6: Clean waters and sanitation ===
Health at the individual and community level requires access to safe water and sanitation, which contributes to environmental conditions such as preventing spreading diseases.

== Organizations ==
Organizations dedicated to good health and well-being include:

- The Global Fund to Fight AIDS
  - Financing mechanism for ensuring health, safety, and future of all people against AIDS, tuberculosis (TB) and malaria
- Joint United Nations Program on HIV/AIDS (UNAIDS)
  - One of the United Nations Development Group, which is global action for preventing HIV/AIDS pandemic
- World Bank
  - International organization to assist developing countries financially such as low-interest loans and credits, and grants
- World Health Organization (WHO)
  - A specialized agency of the United Nations (UN), contributing to the well-being around the world by coordinating the health system, preventing expansion of disease, and making health service accessible
- UNICEF
  - The United Nations agency for children, working for the rights of children across more than 190 countries and territories
- Department of Economic and Social Affairs (DESA)
  - Department for the rights of Indigenous Peoples with advice on Indigenous issues in the UN system
- United Nations Office on Drugs and Crime (UNODC)
  - A United Nations Office to support countries to prevent drugs and crime problems through the human criminal justice system and conventions
- Organisation for Economic Co-operation and Development (OECD)
  - An International organization for improvign policies mainly in developed countries compared with other policies for the economy
- UN Women
  - A United Nations agency for the righths of women and girls in the fields of gender equality including violence against women and LGBT people
- Gavi the Vaccine Alliance
  - A public-private partnership contributing to distributing necessary vaccines for children in developing countries
- Vodafone Foundation
  - A British multinational telecommunications company developing programs for digital learning, resilience for crisis
- Doctors Without Borders
  - A non-governmental organization working for the medical care in the area of conflivt or in the time of pandemic
- Red Cross International
  - An independent organization assisting people form conflict or other violence and rasing awareness of the reality to let the government and people make a change.
- Medical IMPACT
  - Non-governmental, non-profit organization providing medical support where and when needed and rasing awareness about healthcare
- Partners in Health
  - An international nonprofit public health organization ensuring health support in providing medical care, management of sanitary condition, and fostering staff in developing countries
- PanAfricare
  - Organization for well-being and health in Africa ensuring several necessities for the basic life such as education, communities, healthcare, and industries in the local area
- The Global Health Network
  - A platform of collection of websites providing information about health such as disease and its regions, related support, and other organizations
