= Lianne Gonsalves =

American public health scientist at the World Health Organization

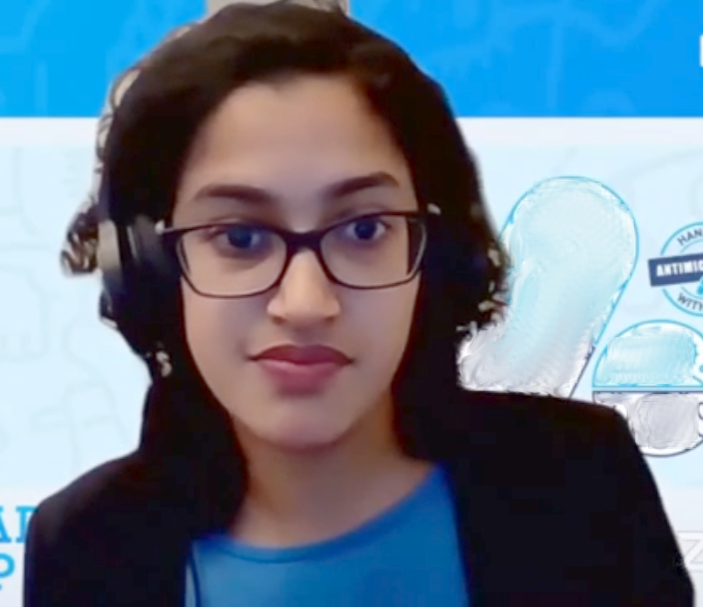
- In a 2021 video on World Antimicrobial Awareness Week
- Born: Lianne Marie Gonsalves
- Education: North Carolina State University; Johns Hopkins Bloomberg School of Public Health
- Occupation: Scientist
- Employer: World Health Organization

Lianne Marie Gonsalves is an American scientist and technical officer for the Department of Sexual and Reproductive Health and Research at the World Health Organization in Geneva. Her research explores the area of adolescent sexual and reproductive health.

== Background ==
Gonsalves grew up in Cary, North Carolina. As an undergraduate at North Carolina State University, Gonsalves pursued a course in biological sciences with the possible ambition of becoming a doctor. While at university, an undergraduate research trip to Guatemala encouraged her to pursue studies in public health. She graduated from NC State in 2010, later moving to Venezuela for a Fulbright Scholarship. In 2013, Gonsalves graduated from the Johns Hopkins Bloomberg School of Public Health with a Masters of Science in Public Health. At Johns Hopkins, she researched family planning practices in Ethiopia on a Boren Scholarship. She later earned her doctorate in epidemiology at the Swiss Tropical and Public Health Institute. For her doctoral dissertation, she researched the role of pharmacies as contraceptive outlets for young people in Kenya.

=== World Health Organization ===
Gonsalves joined the World Health Organization (WHO) in 2013. At WHO, she leads public engagement on the topics of sexual education, health and well-being, as well as research initiatives on the topics of contraception, intersex surgery and sexual education.

Her projects have included the World Health Organization Sexual Health Survey, a comprehensive project on global sexual health, and she has led reports linking sexual and reproductive health to the United Nations Sustainable Development Goals (SDGs), specifically the Sustainable Development Goal 3.7 of "Universal access to sexual and reproductive care, family planning and education."

Gonsalves also manages the WHO's ARMADILLO digital sexual health information project in Kenya and Peru which has pioneered a free text message service offering young people access to accurate and understandable information on sexual and reproductive health.

== See also ==
- Comprehensive sex education
