= Road toll (Australia and New Zealand) =

Number of deaths caused by road accidents

Around 1,200 people are killed each year on Australia's roads and about 40,000 are seriously injured. Australia has a goal of zero deaths and serious injuries on our roads by 2050 (Vision Zero).

In 2024, the provisional number of road deaths in New Zealand stands at 289. The New Zealand Government publishes Road Safety Objectives, which outlines a plan for tackling road safety issues.

New Zealand’s annual rate of road deaths per 100,000 people is higher than comparable states in Australia. In 2022, New Zealand had 7.3 road deaths per 100,000 people. With similar populations and road networks, Victoria had 4.4 road deaths per 100,000 people, and Queensland had 5.1 road deaths per 100,000 people. New Zealand ended 2024 with its lowest per capita road death rate in over 100 years, according to provisional data.

== See also ==
- List of countries by traffic-related death rate
- List of motor vehicle deaths in Australia by year
