= List of motor vehicle deaths in Iceland by year =

This is a list of motor vehicle deaths in Iceland by year. The first fatal vehicle accident in Iceland occurred 29 June 1919, when 66-year-old pedestrian Ólöf Margrét Helgadóttir was hit in Bankastræti at the intersection with Ingólfsstræti. She sustained severe injuries when the front wheels of the vehicle went over her and died the following day.

== List ==
Year	Deaths	Deaths per 100,000
1963	19	10.22
1964	25	13.23
1965	20	10.42
1966	19	9.69
1967	20	10.05
1968	6	2.99
1969	12	5.91
1970	20	9.80
1971	21	10.19
1972	23	11.00
1973	25	11.79
1974	20	9.30
1975	33	15.14
1976	19	8.64
1977	37	16.67
1978	27	12.05
1979	27	11.95
1980	25	10.96
1981	24	10.39
1982	24	10.26
1983	18	7.59
1984	27	11.25
1985	24	9.96
1986	24	9.88
1987	24	9.76
1988	29	11.60
1989	28	11.07
1990	24	9.41
1991	27	10.47
1992	21	8.05
1993	17	6.44
1994	12	4.51
1995	24	8.99
1996	10	3.72
1997	15	5.54
1998	27	9.85
1999	21	7.58
2000	32	11.39
2001	24	8.42
2002	29	10.07
2003	23	7.93
2004	23	7.88
2005	19	6.40
2006	31	10.20
2007	15	4.87
2008	12	3.81
2009	17	5.35
2010	8	2.52
2011	12	3.75
2012	9	2.80
2013	15	4.60
2014	4	1.22
2015	16	4.80
2016	18	5.33
2017	16	4.58
2018	18	5.04
2019	6	1.65
2020	8	2.17
2021	9	2.39
2022	9	2.32

== See also ==
- List of motor vehicle deaths in Australia by year
- List of motor vehicle deaths in Japan by year
- List of motor vehicle deaths in Thailand by year
- Motor vehicle fatality rate in U.S. by year
