= List of motor vehicle deaths in Japan by year =

This article presents a list of motor vehicle deaths in Japan by year. Deaths are currently defined by those who die within 30 days of the date of the accident, but 1980 and before are one-day accident deaths. Fatalities reached a record high in 1970. The Index base year is 1989. (Index=100)

Per population, fatalities are 1/4 in 2008 of that of 1970, and per kilometer, one-sixth in 2007 of the 1970 rate. The total for 2012 was 4,411 deaths. and for 2017, it has dropped to 3,694 deaths, of 2,020 involved a driver over 65 or 54.7% of the total, with sharply rising rates of deadly accidents with each decade of driver age after 65. Some 36% of deaths were pedestrians, 13% were bicyclists, and alcohol-related deaths were 1/3 at 213 less than a decade earlier, among other statistics. Total deaths have fallen further to 3,215 in 2019, with drivers over age 75 a concern. Total deaths have fallen further to 2,839 in 2020, with drivers. Total deaths have fallen further to 2,636 in 2021, with drivers. Total deaths have fallen further to 2,547 in 2025, with drivers. In 2025 Individuals aged 65 or older accounted for 55.9 % of the deaths, or 1,423 deaths.

year	deaths		injuries (1000s)		registered vehicles (1000s)		population (1000s)		vehicle km (blns)	
year	number	idx	number	idx	number	idx	number	idx	number	idx
1952	4,696									
1970	16,765	151	981.1	120	28,390	37	103,720	84	2.26	38
1976	9,734	88	614.0	75	40,890	54	113,094	92	3.097	52
1980	8,760	79	598.7	73	52,250	69	117,060	95	3.891	65
1985	9,261	84	681.3	84	67,040	88	121,049	98	4.494	71
1990	11,227	101	790.3	97	78,110	103	123,611	100	6.286	105
1994	10,649									
1995	10,679	96	922.7	113	84,970	112	125,570	102	7.203	120
1996	9,942									
1997	9,640									
1998	9,211									
1999	9,006									
2000	9,066	82	1155.7	142	89,250	117	126,926	103	7.757	129
2001	8,747									
2002	8,326									
2003	7,702									
2004	7,358									
2005	6,871	62	1156.6	142	91,380	120	127,768	104	7.689	128
2006	6,352									
2007	5,744	52	1034.4	127	91,170	120	127,771	104	N/A	
2008	5,155						127,700	104		
2009	4,914	44	908.9	111			127,600	104		
2010	4,863						128,056			
2011	4,612						127,799			
2016	3,904						–			
2017	3,694						–			
2018	3,532						–			
2019	3,215						–			
2020	2,839						–			
2021	2,636						–			
2022	2,610						–			
2023	2,678						–			
2024	2,663						–			
2025	2,547						–			

Notes: Death definition before and after 1980 are not exactly comparable (1-day vs 30-day) but have this additional margin of error.

Yearly killed in Japan. View chart definition.	Yearly killed per million population in Japan. View chart definition.

== See also ==
- List of motor vehicle deaths in Australia by year
- List of motor vehicle deaths in Iceland by year
- List of motor vehicle deaths in Thailand by year
- Motor vehicle fatality rate in U.S. by year
