= List of motor vehicle deaths in Australia by year =

This is a list of motor vehicle deaths in Australia by year. It shows the annual number of road fatalities (road deaths or Road toll) per capita per year, per vehicle and per vehicle-km in the year the data was collected. The list includes all road users such as drivers, passengers, pedestrians, motorcyclists and cyclists.

Year	Total road fatalities	Road fatalities per 100,000 population per year	Road fatalities per 100,000 motor vehicles	Road fatalities per 1 billion vehicle-km	Source
1925	700	11.8	229		
1926	901	14.9	231		
1927	943	15.3	190		
1928	1,003	15.9	177		
1929	1,145	17.9	181		
1930	1,054	16.3	161		
1931	916	14.0	152		
1932	818	12.4	139		
1933	914	13.8	148		
1934	952	14.3	148		
1935	1,100	16.4	160		
1936	1,350	19.9	182		
1937	1,387	20.3	175		
1938	1,483	21.5	173		
1939	1,426	20.5	159		
1940	1,558	22.1	174		
1941	1,298	18.3	149		
1942	1,297	18.1	173		
1943	1,340	18.5	173		
1944	1,089	14.9	133		
1945	1,011	13.7	118		
1946	1,270	17.0	137		
1947	1,346	17.8	133		
1948	1,348	17.5	122		
1949	1,424	18.0	116		
1950	1,643	20.1	118		
1951	1,926	22.9	122		
1952	2,054	23.8	116		
1953	1,856	21.1	101		
1954	1,976	22.0	101		
1955	2,042	22.2	96		
1956	2,119	22.5	94		
1957	2,113	21.9	89		
1958	2,146	21.8	86		
1959	2,264	22.5	85		
1960	2,468	24.0	87		
1961	2,542	24.1	86		
1962	2,535	23.6	82		
1963	2,598	23.7	79		
1964	2,966	26.6	84		
1965	3,164	27.8	85		
1966	3,242	27.9	83		
1967	3,166	26.8	77		
1968	3,382	28.2	79		
1969	3,502	28.6	78		
1970	3,798	30.4	80		
1971	3,590	27.7	71	44	
1972	3,422	26.0	64		
1973	3,679	27.5	66		
1974	3,572	26.3	60		
1975	3,694	26.6	59		
1976	3,583	25.5	54	35.5	
1977	3,578	25.2	52		
1978	3,705	25.8	52		
1979	3,508	24.2	48	31.5	
1980	3,272	22.3	43		
1981	3,321	22.3	42		
1982	3,252	21.4	39	25.6	
1983	2,755	17.9	32		
1984	2,822	18.1	32		
1985	2,941	18.63	32.3	20.9	
1986	2,888	18.0	31		
1987	2,772	17.0	30		
1988	2,887	17.5	30	18.8	
1989	2,801	16.7	29		
1990	2,331	13.66	23.1		
1991	2,113	12.2	21	14.1	
1992	1,974	11.28	19		
1993	1,953	11.05	19		
1994	1,928	10.80	18.0		
1995	2,017	11.16	18.4	12.1	
1996	1,970	10.76	17.3		
1997	1,767	9.54	15.1		
1998	1,755	9.38	14.5	10.5	
1999	1,764	9.32	14.4		
2000	1,817	9.49	14.6	9.8	
2001	1,737	8.95	13.9	9.1	
2002	1,715	8.73	13.4	8.9	
2003	1,621	8.15	12.3	8.0	
2004	1,583	7.86	11.7	8.0	
2005	1,627	7.98	11.7	7.9	
2006	1,598	7.72	11.2	7.7	
2007	1,603	7.62	10.8	7.4	
2008	1,437	6.68	9	6.5	
2009	1,491	6.78, or 6.86	10	6.7	
2010	1,353	6.06, or 6.14	8.4	6.1	
2011	1,277	5.71, or 5.72	5.5	5.5	
2012	1,300	5.78, or 5.73	5.4	5.5	
2013	1,187	5.16	4.6	5.0	
2014	1,150	4.91	4.5	4.8	
2015	1,209	5.08		5.0	
2016	1,293	5.34		5.0	
2017	1,225	4.98		5.0	
2018	1,135	4.60		4.0	
2019	1,194	4.3			
2020	1,095	4.3		4.4	
2021	1,123	4.4			
2022	1,194	4.6			
2023	1,266	4.8			
2024	1,300	4.8			
2025	1,314	4.8			

== Graph ==
View source data.
View source data.

== See also ==
- List of motor vehicle deaths in Iceland by year
- List of motor vehicle deaths in Japan by year
- List of motor vehicle deaths in Thailand by year
- Motor vehicle fatality rate in U.S. by year
