= Smeed's law =

Correlation between the number of cars and traffic deaths

Log-log plots of annual road deaths D (solid), annual road deaths per capita D/p (dotted) and annual road deaths per registered vehicle D/n (dashed) vs number of registered vehicles n for various country populations p as predicted by Smeed's Law – the green arrows show that if p is 10 million and n is 3 million, then D is around 2000, D/n is around 0.0007 and D/p is around 0.0002

Smeed's law is an empirical rule suggested to relate traffic fatalities to traffic congestion as measured by the proxy of motor vehicle registrations and country population. The law proposes that increasing traffic volume (an increase in motor vehicle registrations) leads to an increase in fatalities per capita, but a decrease in fatalities per vehicle.

The relationship is named after statistician Reuben Smeed, who first proposed it in 1949. Smeed also predicted that the average speed of traffic in central London would always be nine miles per hour, because that is the minimum speed that people tolerate. He predicted that any intervention intended to speed traffic would only lead to more people driving at this "tolerable" speed unless there were any other disincentives against doing so.

His hypothesis in relation to road traffic safety has been refuted by several authors, who point out that fatalities per person have decreased in many countries, when according to Smeed's law requires they should increase as long as the number of vehicles per person continues to rise.

== Smeed's formula ==
Smeed's formula is expressed as:

$$D = 0.0003 \sqrt[3]{np^2}$$

or, weighted per capita,

$${D \over p} = 0.0003 \Big( {n \over p} \Big) ^ {1 \over 3}$$

and weighted per vehicle,

$${D \over n} = 0.0003 \Big( {p \over n} \Big) ^ {2 \over 3}$$

where $D$ is annual road deaths, $n$ is number of registered vehicles, and $p$ is population.

Smeed published his research for twenty countries, and, by his death in 1976, he had expanded this to 46 countries, all showing this result. Smeed became deputy director of the Road Research Laboratory and, later, Professor at University College London.

== Smeed's interpretation ==
=== Road safety ===
Smeed claimed his law expresses a hypothesis of group psychology: people take advantage of improvements in automobiles or infrastructure to drive ever more recklessly in the interests of speed until deaths rise to a socially unacceptable level, at which point, safety becomes more important, and recklessness less tolerated.

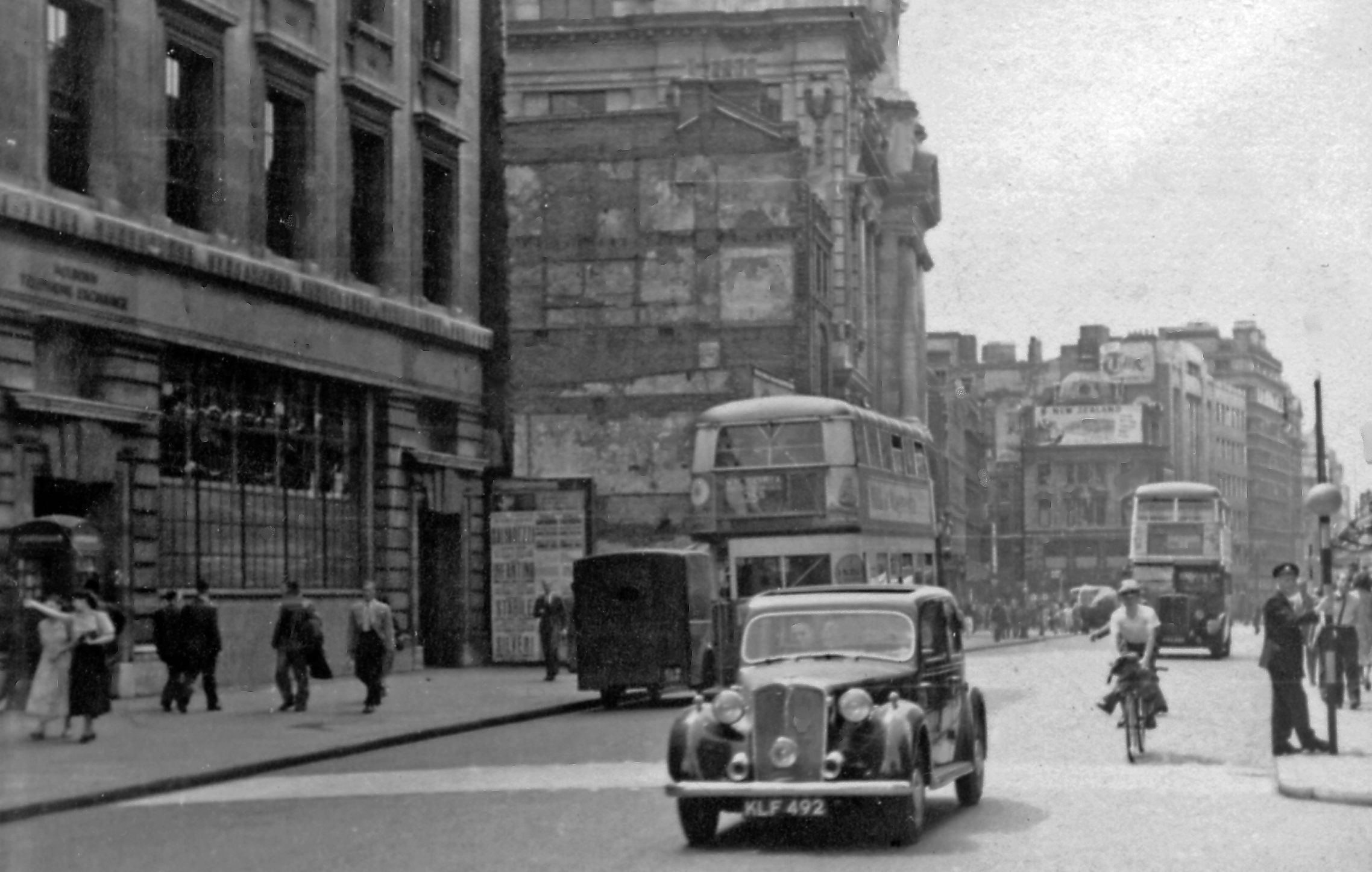
Traffic in central London in 1949. Smeed believed that the average speed of traffic in the city would remain nine miles per hour.

Freeman Dyson summarized his friend's view as:

Smeed had a fatalistic view of traffic flow. He said that the average speed of traffic in central London would always be nine miles per hour, because that is the minimum speed that people will tolerate. Intelligent use of traffic lights might increase the number of cars on the roads but would not increase their speed. As soon as the traffic flowed faster, more drivers would come to slow it down.....Smeed interpreted his law as a law of human nature. The number of deaths is determined mainly by psychological factors that are independent of material circumstances. People will drive recklessly until the number of deaths reaches the maximum they can tolerate. When the number exceeds that limit, they drive more carefully. Smeed's Law merely defines the number of deaths that we find psychologically tolerable.

Whilst in charge of the RRL's traffic and safety division, Smeed's views on speeds and accidents were well reported at the time of the introduction of a mandatory speed limit on UK roads: "If I wanted to stop all road accidents I would ban the car and introduce an overall speed limit, for there is no doubt that speed limits reduce accidents. Of course, roads with higher speeds often have lower accident rates. It is only on the safer, clear roads that you can drive fast - but that does not prove that you are driving more safely."

He recognised that few methods of reducing accidents were painless and thus preferred to report facts and not to make direct recommendations as: "political, social and economic factors come in - but the people who make the decisions must know what the facts are on a subject".

=== Speeds on congested roads ===
At the opposite end of this theory was Smeed's observations of heavily congested networks. He noted that at some minimum speed, motorists would simply choose not to drive. If speeds fell below 9 mph (14.5 km/h), then drivers would keep away; as speeds rose above this limit, it would draw more drivers out until the roads became congested again.

== Empirical contradictions ==
The Australian state of Victoria experienced deaths in excess of the Smeed formula until about 1970, but subsequently adopted a range of interventions which took it from being a poor performer in terms of road safety to one of the best. Deaths fell in absolute terms from a peak of 1000 in 1970 to below 300 in 2009, despite strong growth in population and the number of vehicles.

Critics observe that fatality rates per vehicle are now decreasing faster than the formula would suggest, and that, in many cases, fatality rates per person are also falling, contrary to Smeed's prediction. They attribute this improvement to effective safety interventions. (see Andreassen, Broughton, Oppe, and Ameen & Naji)

However, John Adams of University College London argued in 1995 that Smeed's law linking deaths, vehicle-miles and population was still valid for a variety of countries over time, claiming that the relationship held for 62 countries. He noted an enormous difference in fatality rates across different parts of the world in spite of safety interventions, and suggested that Smeed's Law was still useful in establishing general trends, especially when using a very long time period. Variations from the trend were normally better explained through economics, rather than claimed safety interventions. However, Adams found that Smeed's calculation of estimated deaths from vehicles per population was less successful than the calculation for vehicle-miles.

A 2007 study used a population of 139 countries, where Smeed originally sampled 20 of the most developed countries. This study concluded that Smeed’s Law is still applicable in fatalities in countries with a ratio of 0.2 - 0.3 vehicle per person, but in countries with a higher ratio, the number of fatalities decreases greatly. This may mean that Smeed’s Law does not take into account any cultural differences nor laws that may decrease the number of fatalities.

Other researchers have tried to find a way to describe the trends in countries with a higher vehicle per person ratio. One study suggested that at higher ratios, a collective psychology is formed where people are more aware of the risk of motor vehicle related deaths and are inherently more careful in their driving. Since the 1940s, when Smeed's Law was first created, the number of motor vehicles has greatly increased, but so have the number of laws, stricter speed limits, and more car safety factors and features. Education on motor vehicles and safe driving habits are more common, but are not considered in Smeed's Law. High-income countries are typically able to invest in their road infrastructure and its maintenance, traffic safety research and maintenance, vehicle development, and driver education.

== See also ==
- Induced demand
- Disappearing traffic
- fr:Modèle de Nilsson (French)
