= List of motor vehicle deaths in Thailand by year =

This is a list of motor vehicle deaths in Thailand by year. As of 2012 54% of motor vehicles in Thailand were two or three-wheeled vehicles. These vehicles were involved in 73% of fatalities. A fatality is defined as a death within 30 days of a crash. There were 212,060 km of roads in 2006: 61,747 km of highways, 313 km of motorways, 42,500 km of rural roads, and 107,500 km of local roads under local administration.

== Deaths by year ==
Year	Deaths	Crashes	Registered vehicles	Source
1997	13,836	82,336	17,666,240	
1998	▼12,234	▼73,725	18,860,512	
1999	▼12,040	▼67,800	20,096,536	
2000	▼11,988	▲73,737	20,835,684	
2001	▼11,652	▲77,616	22,589,185	
2002	▲13,116	▲91,623	24,517,250	
2003	▲14,446	▲104,642	26,378,862	
2004	▼13,766	▲124,530	20,624,719*	
2005	▼12,858	▼122,040	22,571,062*	
2006	▼12,069	▼111,035	24,807,297*	
2007	12,492	101,752		
2008	11,561	88,721		
2009	10,717	84,806		
2010	10,742	74,379		
2011	9,910	68,269		
2012	14,059 (reported); 24,237 (WHO est)	61,197	32,476,977	
2021	18,218 (WHO est)			

== See also ==
- Department of Rural Roads
- List of countries by traffic-related death rate
- List of motor vehicle deaths in Iceland by year
- Thai highway network
