= List of U.S. states by road deaths =

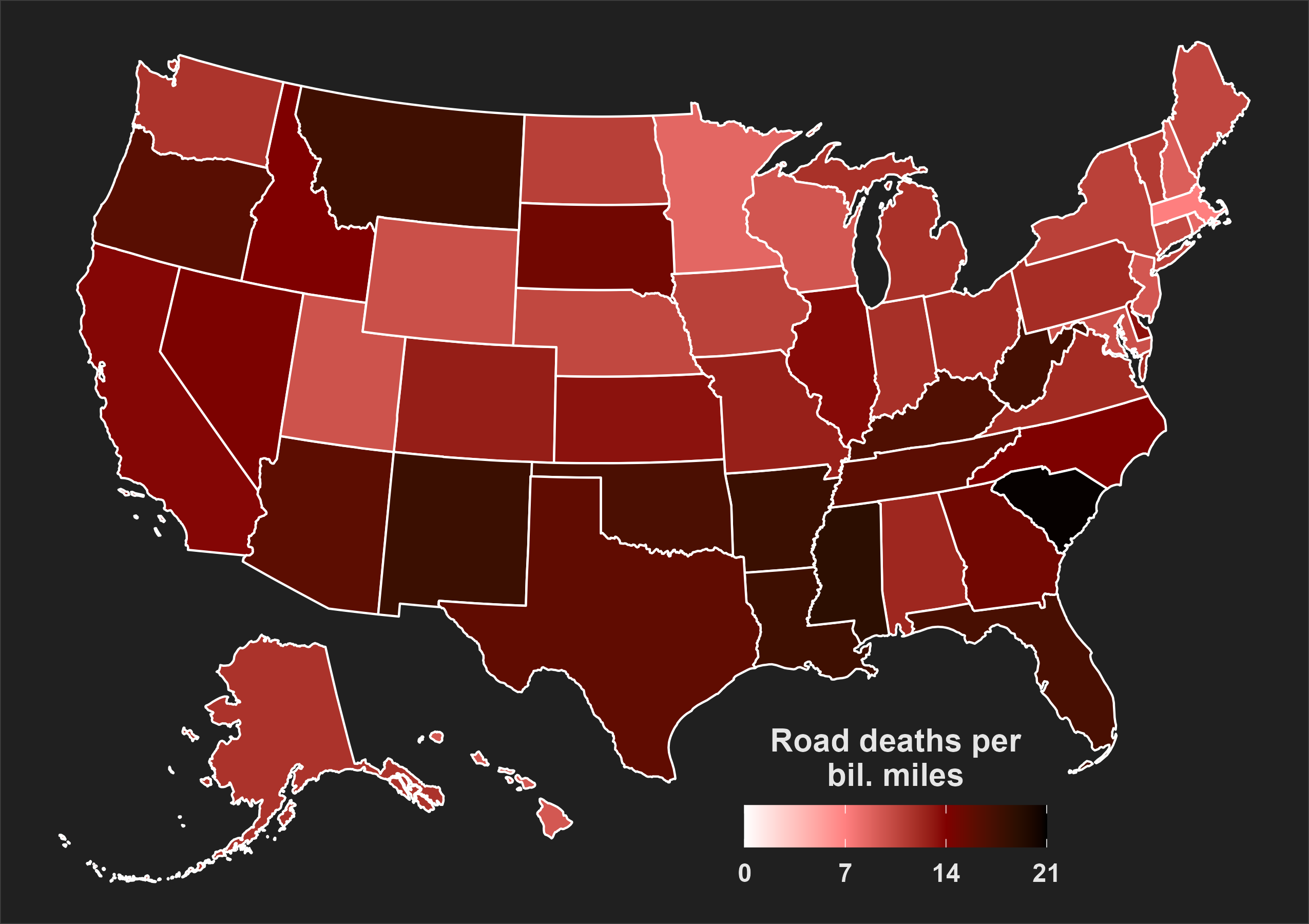
Road deaths per billion vehicle miles (2021)

This is a list of U.S. states by road deaths. Data are for the year 2021. Death data are from NHTSA, mileage figures are from the Bureau of Transportation Statistics and population data are from the US Census.

Per billion vehicle miles, South Carolina had the highest death rate while Massachusetts had the lowest. Mississippi had the most deaths per capita while Rhode Island had the lowest.

One third of fatal accidents involve alcohol. Deaths from speeding exceeded 12,000, half of which involved drivers not wearing a seatbelt, and a third of which involved male drivers aged 15 to 20. According to data from the National Highway Transit Safety Administration, roughly 1 in 4 fatal car crashes in the United States happen at an intersection. Most deaths were occupants of cars, but 17% were pedestrians, 14% were motorcyclists and 2% were cyclists.

Location	Road deaths	Deaths / bil. miles	Deaths / 100k people	Deaths / 100k drivers
United States	42,939	13.7	12.9	18.4
South Carolina	1,198	20.8	23.1	30.0
Mississippi	772	18.9	26.2	38.0
Arkansas	693	18.0	22.9	30.0
New Mexico	481	17.9	22.7	32.6
Louisiana	972	17.8	21.0	28.3
Montana	239	17.7	21.6	27.9
West Virginia	280	17.4	15.7	24.6
Florida	3,738	17.2	17.1	23.2
Oklahoma	762	17.0	19.1	29.3
Kentucky	806	16.8	17.9	27.0
Oregon	599	16.3	14.1	19.8
Tennessee	1,327	16.1	19.1	26.5
Arizona	1,180	16.0	16.2	20.4
Texas	4,498	15.8	15.2	24.6
Georgia	1,797	14.9	16.7	23.4
South Dakota	148	14.8	16.5	22.1
Nevada	385	14.2	12.2	17.9
North Carolina	1,663	14.1	15.7	21.4
Idaho	271	14.0	14.2	20.2
California	4,285	13.8	10.9	15.8
Illinois	1,334	13.7	10.5	15.9
Delaware	136	13.4	13.5	16.0
Kansas	424	13.4	14.4	20.3
Colorado	691	12.8	11.9	15.7
Missouri	1,016	12.7	16.5	23.8
District of Columbia	41	12.6	6.1	8.0
Alabama	983	12.4	19.5	24.2
Virginia	973	12.1	11.2	16.5
Ohio	1,354	12.0	11.5	16.3
Pennsylvania	1,230	12.0	9.5	13.5
Indiana	932	11.9	13.7	20.1
Michigan	1,136	11.7	11.3	14.2
Alaska	67	11.6	9.1	12.9
Washington	670	11.6	8.7	11.4
Vermont	74	11.2	11.4	15.8
North Dakota	101	10.9	13.0	18.4
New York	1,157	10.8	5.8	9.7
Iowa	356	10.8	11.1	15.2
Maine	153	10.5	11.1	14.5
Nebraska	221	10.4	11.3	15.4
Connecticut	298	10.3	8.3	11.4
Wyoming	110	9.9	19.0	25.6
Maryland	561	9.9	9.1	12.6
Utah	328	9.8	9.8	14.9
Wisconsin	620	9.5	10.5	14.3
New Jersey	699	9.5	7.5	10.8
Hawaii	94	9.4	6.5	10.2
New Hampshire	118	9.0	8.5	10.0
Minnesota	488	8.5	8.5	11.8
Rhode Island	63	8.4	5.7	8.3
Massachusetts	417	7.1	6.0	8.5

== See also ==
- Transportation safety in the United States
- Motor vehicle fatality rate in U.S. by year
