= Motor vehicle fatality rate in U.S. by year =

Motor vehicle fatalities in the United States

Road accident deaths per passenger kilometers

Per capita road accident deaths in the US reversed their decline in the early 2010s.

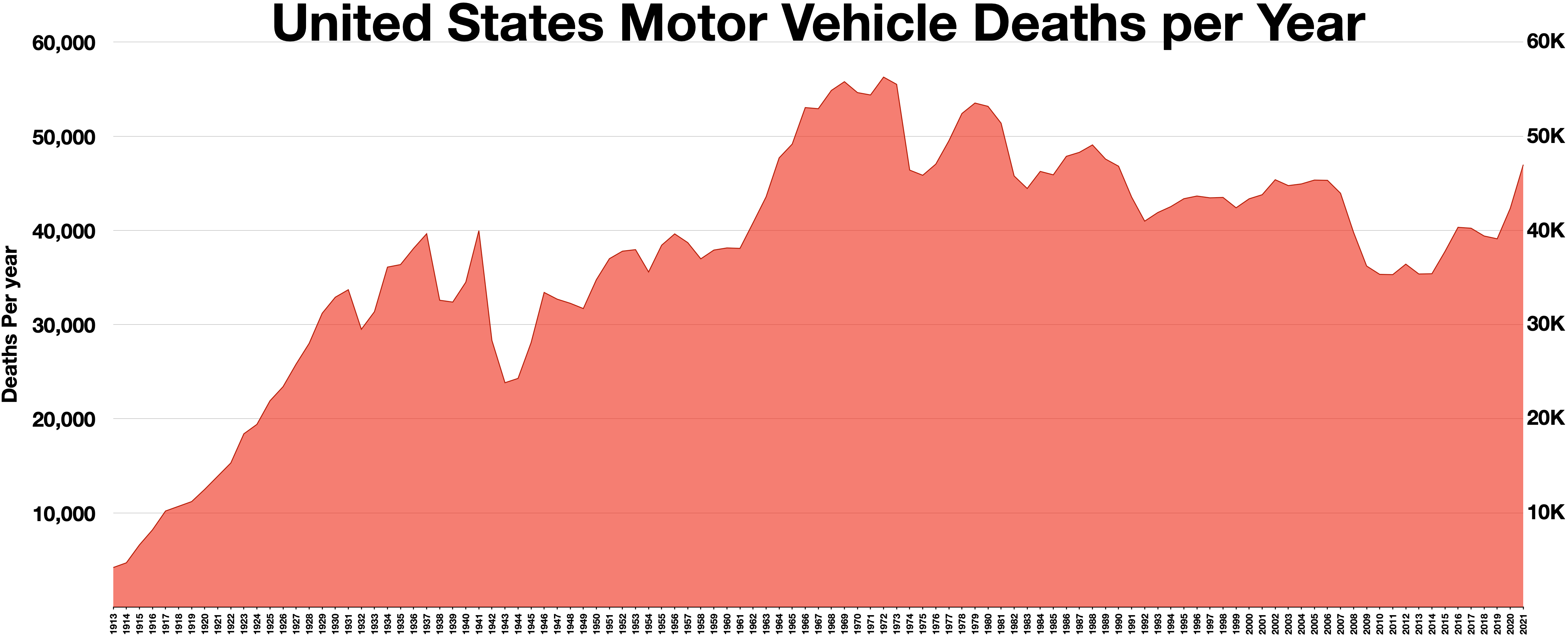
United States motor vehicle deaths per year

Accidental deaths in the United States

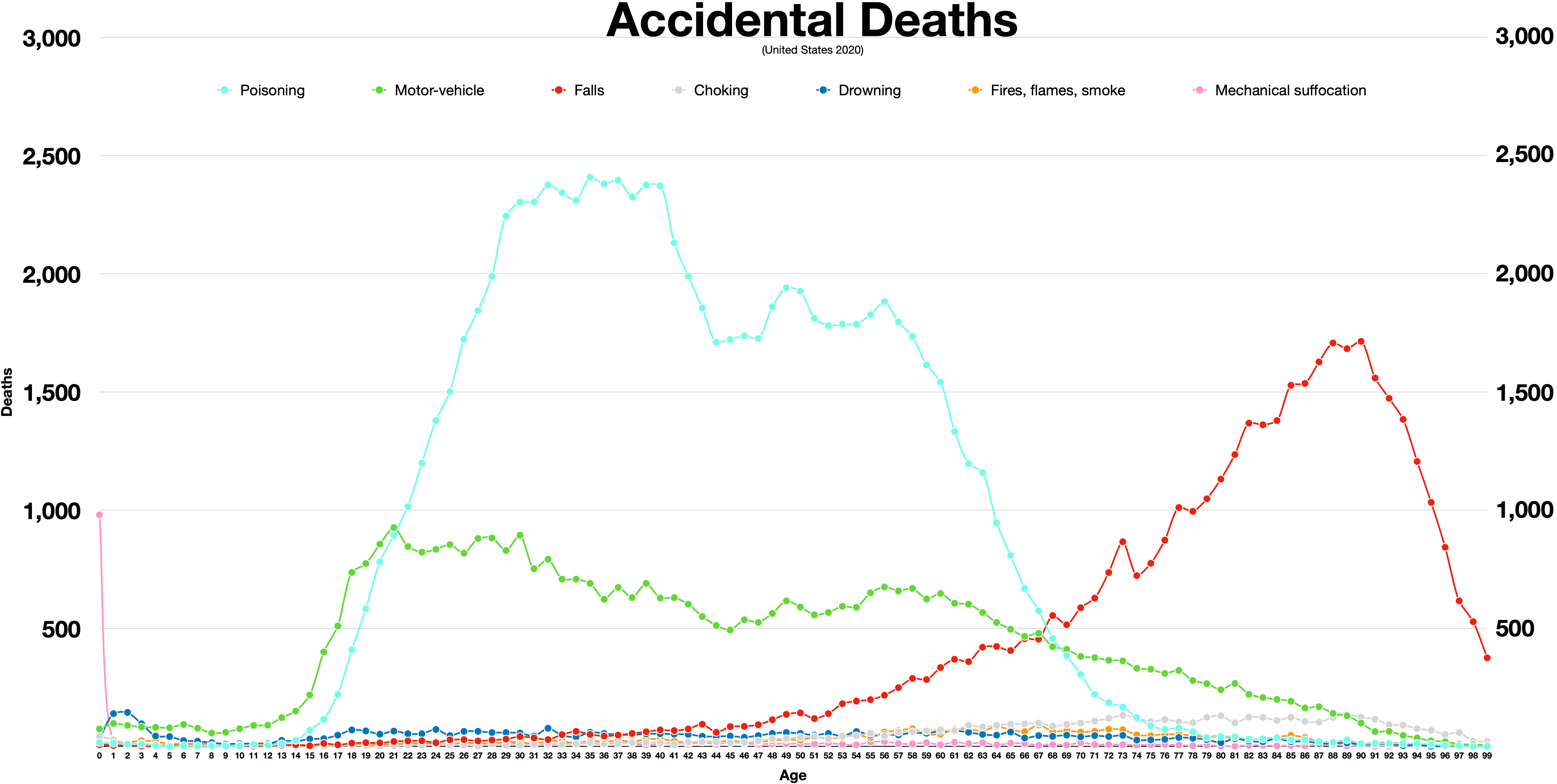
2020

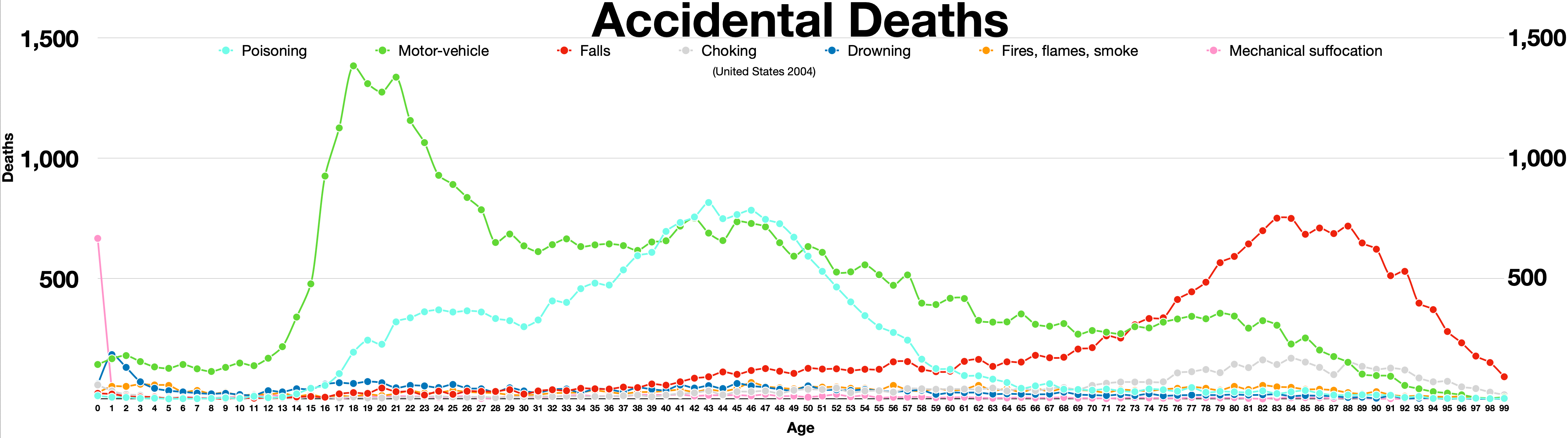
2004

Poisoning
Motor vehicle
Falls
Choking
Drowning
Fires, flames, smoke
Suffocation

Fatalities resulting from motor vehicle crashes are the third largest cause of accidental deaths in the United States. (Note: due to increases in other unintentional injury deaths)

Motor vehicle crashes are the leading cause of preventable death for people aged 5–22, and the second most common cause for ages 23–67.

For pregnant people, motor vehicle crashes are a significant cause of death.

Between 1899 and 2024, there were 4,036,087 traffic fatalities in the United States.

Motor vehicle fatalities in the United States are reported by the National Highway Traffic Safety Administration (NHTSA). The NHTSA only includes deaths that occur on public roads and excludes parking lots, driveways, and private roads. It also excludes indirect car-related fatalities. For more details, see Transportation safety in the United States.

From the beginning of recorded statistics until the 1970s, total traffic deaths in the United States generally trended upwards, except during the Great Depression and World War II. From 1979 to 2005, the number of deaths per year decreased by 15%, while the number of deaths per capita decreased by 35%. The 32,479 traffic fatalities in 2011 were the lowest in 62 years, since 1949.

In 2016, the NHTSA reported 37,461 deaths in 34,436 fatal motor vehicle crashes, an average of 102 per day.

In 2022, there were 42,795 motor vehicle fatalities.

In 2024, there were 39,254 motor vehicle fatalities, including vehicle occupants, motorcyclists, and non-motorists, in 36,297 fatal motor vehicle crashes; an average of 107 deaths and 99 crashes per day.

== By year ==
Year	Deaths	VMT– Vehicle miles traveled (billions)	Fatalities per 100 million VMT	Population	Fatalities per 100,000 population	Change in per capita fatalities from previous year
1899	26					
1900	36			76,094,000	0.05	NA
1901	54			77,584,000	0.07	▲47.1%
1902	79			79,163,000	0.10	▲43.4%
1903	117			80,632,000	0.15	▲45.4%
1904	172			82,166,000	0.21	▲44.3%
1905	252			83,822,000	0.30	▲43.6%
1906	338			85,450,000	0.40	▲31.6%
1907	581			87,008,000	0.67	▲68.8%
1908	751			88,710,000	0.85	▲26.8%
1909	1,174			90,490,000	1.30	▲53.3%
1910	1,599			92,407,000	1.73	▲33.4%
1911	2,043			93,863,000	2.18	▲25.8%
1912	2,968			95,335,000	3.11	▲43.0%
1913	4,079			97,225,000	4.20	▲34.8%
1914	4,468			99,111,000	4.51	▲7.5%
1915	6,779			100,546,000	6.74	▲49.6%
1916	7,766			101,961,000	7.62	▲13.0%
1917	9,630			103,268,000	9.33	▲22.4%
1918	10,390			103,208,000	10.07	▲8.0%
1919	10,896			104,514,000	10.42	▲3.6%
1920	12,155			106,461,000	11.42	▲9.5%
1921	13,253	55	24.09	108,538,000	12.21	▲7.0%
1922	14,859	67	21.95	110,049,000	13.50	▲10.6%
1923	17,870	85	21.03	111,947,000	15.96	▲18.2%
1924	18,400	104	17.55	114,109,000	16.13	▲1.0%
1925	20,771	122	16.98	115,829,000	17.93	▲11.2%
1926	22,194	140	15.77	117,397,000	18.91	▲5.4%
1927	24,470	158	15.44	119,035,000	20.56	▲8.7%
1928	26,557	172	15.36	120,509,000	22.04	▲7.2%
1929	29,592	197	14.97	121,767,000	24.30	▲10.3%
1930	31,204	206	15.12	123,076,741	25.35	▲4.3%
1931	31,963	216	14.79	124,039,648	25.77	▲1.6%
1932	27,979	200	13.95	124,840,471	22.41	▼-13.0%
1933	29,746	200	14.83	125,578,763	23.69	▲5.7%
1934	34,240	215	15.88	126,373,773	27.09	▲14.4%
1935	34,494	228	15.09	127,250,232	27.11	▲0.1%
1936	36,126	252	14.33	128,053,180	28.21	▲4.1%
1937	37,819	270	14.00	128,824,829	29.36	▲4.1%
1938	31,083	271	11.46	129,824,939	23.94	▼-18.4%
1939	30,895	285	10.83	130,879,718	23.61	▼-1.4%
1940	32,914	302	10.89	132,122,446	24.91	▲5.5%
1941	38,142	333	11.43	133,402,471	28.59	▲14.8%
1942	27,007	268	10.07	134,859,553	20.03	▼-30.0%
1943	22,727	208	10.92	136,739,353	16.62	▼-17.0%
1944	23,165	212	10.89	138,397,345	16.74	▲0.7%
1945	26,785	250	10.71	139,928,165	19.14	▲14.4%
1946	31,874	340	9.35	141,388,566	22.54	▲17.8%
1947	31,193	370	8.41	144,126,071	21.64	▼-4.0%
1948	30,775	397	7.73	146,631,302	21.00	▼-3.0%
1949	30,246	424	7.13	149,188,130	20.27	▼-3.4%
1950	33,186	458	7.24	152,271,417	21.79	▲7.5%
1951	35,309	491	7.19	154,877,889	22.80	▲4.6%
1952	36,088	513	7.03	157,552,740	22.91	▲0.5%
1953	36,190	544	6.65	160,184,192	22.59	▼-1.4%
1954	33,890	561	6.03	163,025,854	20.79	▼-8.0%
1955	36,688	605	6.06	165,931,202	22.11	▲6.4%
1956	37,965	627	6.05	168,903,031	22.48	▲1.7%
1957	36,932	647	5.71	171,984,130	21.47	▼-4.5%
1958	35,331	664	5.32	174,881,904	20.20	▼-5.9%
1959	36,223	700	5.17	177,829,628	20.37	▲0.8%
1960	36,399	718	5.06	180,671,158	20.15	▼-1.1%
1961	36,285	737	4.92	183,691,481	19.75	▼-2.0%
1962	38,980	766	5.08	186,537,737	20.90	▲5.8%
1963	41,723	805	5.18	189,241,798	22.05	▲5.5%
1964	45,645	846	5.39	191,888,791	23.79	▲7.9%
1965	47,089	887	5.30	194,302,963	24.24	▲1.9%
1966	50,894	925	5.50	196,560,338	25.89	▲6.8%
1967	50,724	964	5.26	198,712,056	25.53	▼-1.4%
1968	52,725	1,015	5.19	200,706,052	26.27	▲2.9%
1969	53,543	1,061	5.04	202,676,946	26.42	▲0.6%
1970	52,627	1,109	4.74	205,052,174	25.67	▼-2.9%
1971	52,542	1,178	4.46	207,660,677	25.30	▼-1.4%
1972	54,589	1,259	4.33	209,896,021	26.01	▲2.8%
1973	54,052	1,313	4.12	211,908,788	25.51	▼-1.9%
1974	45,196	1,280	3.53	213,853,928	21.13	▼-17.1%
1975	44,525	1,327	3.35	215,973,199	20.62	▼-2.5%
1976	45,523	1,402	3.25	218,035,164	20.88	▲1.3%
1977	47,878	1,467	3.26	220,239,425	21.74	▲4.1%
1978	50,331	1,544	3.26	222,584,545	22.61	▲4.0%
1979	51,093	1,529	3.34	225,055,487	22.70	▲0.4%
1980	51,091	1,527	3.35	227,224,681	22.48	▼-1.0%
1981	49,301	1,552	3.18	229,465,714	21.49	▼-4.5%
1982	43,945	1,595	2.76	231,664,458	18.97	▼-11.7%
1983	42,589	1,652	2.58	233,791,994	18.22	▼-4.0%
1984	44,257	1,720	2.57	235,824,902	18.77	▲3.0%
1985	43,825	1,774	2.47	237,923,795	18.42	▼-1.9%
1986	46,087	1,834	2.51	240,132,887	19.19	▲4.2%
1987	46,390	1,921	2.42	242,288,918	19.15	▼-0.2%
1988	47,087	2,025	2.32	244,498,982	19.26	▲0.6%
1989	45,582	2,096	2.17	246,819,230	18.47	▼-4.1%
1990	44,599	2,144	2.08	249,464,396	17.88	▼-3.2%
1991	41,508	2,172	1.91	252,153,092	16.46	▼-7.9%
1992	39,250	2,247	1.75	255,029,699	15.39	▼-6.5%
1993	40,150	2,296	1.75	257,782,608	15.58	▲1.2%
1994	40,716	2,358	1.73	260,327,021	15.64	▲0.4%
1995	41,817	2,423	1.73	262,803,276	15.91	▲1.7%
1996	42,065	2,486	1.69	265,228,572	15.86	▼-0.3%
1997	42,013	2,562	1.64	267,783,607	15.69	▼-1.1%
1998	41,501	2,632	1.58	270,248,003	15.36	▼-2.1%
1999	41,717	2,691	1.55	272,690,813	15.30	▼-0.4%
2000	41,945	2,747	1.53	282,216,952	14.86	▼-2.9%
2001	42,196	2,797	1.51	285,226,284	14.79	▼-0.5%
2002	43,005	2,856	1.51	288,125,973	14.93	▲0.9%
2003	42,884	2,890	1.48	290,796,023	14.75	▼-1.8%
2004	42,836	2,965	1.44	293,638,158	14.59	▼-0.5%
2005	43,510	2,989	1.46	296,507,061	14.67	▲0.4%
2006	42,708	3,014	1.42	299,398,484	14.27	▼-2.8%
2007	41,259	3,031	1.36	301,139,947	13.70	▼-3.9%
2008	37,423	2,977	1.26	303,824,640	12.32	▼-11.0%
2009	33,883	2,957	1.15	306,700,000	11.05	▼-9.7%
2010	32,999	2,967	1.11	309,326,000	10.67	▼-3.5%
2011	32,479	2,950	1.10	311,588,000	10.42	▼-2.3%
2012	33,782	2,969	1.14	313,914,000	10.75	▲2.6%
2013	32,893	2,988	1.10	316,129,000	10.40	▼-3.3%
2014	32,744	3,026	1.08	318,860,000	10.28	▼-1.2%
2015	35,485	3,095	1.15	321,370,000	11.06	▲7.6%
2016	37,806	3,174	1.19	323,121,000	11.59	▲4.8%
2017	37,473	3,213	1.16	326,213,213	11.40	▼-1.6%
2018	36,835	3,223	1.13	327,096,265	11.18	▼-1.9%
2019	36,355	3,248	1.10	328,231,337	10.99	▼-1.2%
2020	38,824	2,904	1.34	331,449,281	11.67	▲7.1%
2021	43,230	3,230	1.38	332,915,073	13.02	▲11.6%
2022	42,514	3,196	1.35 (estimate) 1.33 (division)	338,289,857	12.76	▼-2.00%
For recent years, data may not be as consistent as previous years, due to different methods (estimates) or different sources
2023	40,901	3,263	1.26	339,996,563	12.03	▼-5.7%
2024	39,254		1.19	341,814,420	11.48	▼-4.6%
2025	36,640 (estimate)		1.1	343,603,404	10.66	▼-7.1%

== See also ==
- List of U.S. states by road deaths
- Following distance
