= Transportation safety in the United States =

Overview of transportation safety

Per capita road accident deaths in the US reversed their decline in the early 2010s.

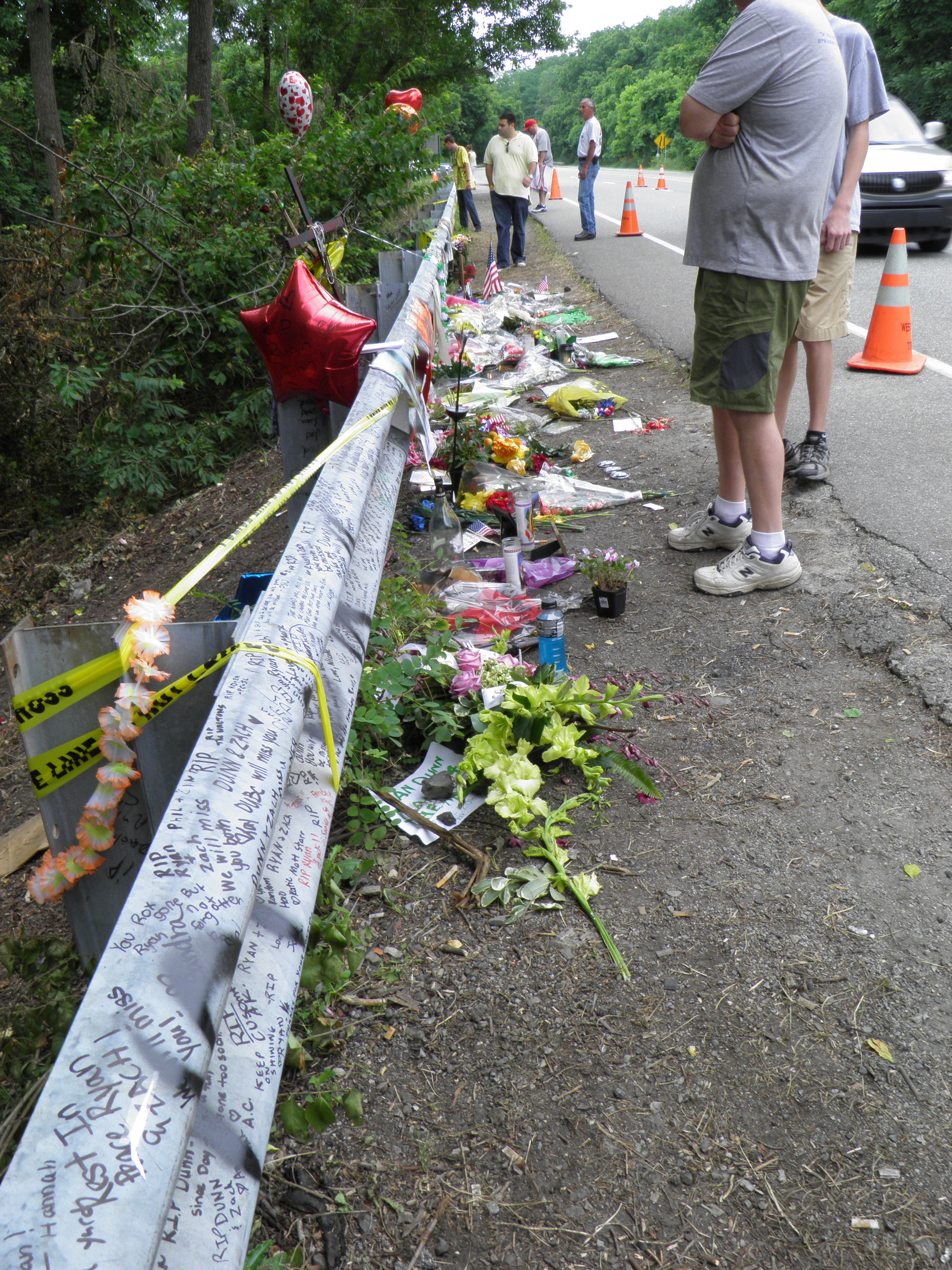
Flowers, balloons, and notes left at the crash scene in West Goshen Township, Pennsylvania, United States

Transportation safety in the United States encompasses safety of transportation in the United States, including automobile crashes, airplane crashes, rail crashes, and other mass transit incidents, although the most fatalities are generated by road incidents annually killing 32,479 people in 2011 to over 42,000 people in 2022. The number of deaths per passenger-mile on commercial airlines in the United States between 2000 and 2010 was about 0.2 deaths per 10 billion passenger-miles. For driving, the rate was 150 per 10 billion vehicle-miles: 750 times higher per mile than for flying in a commercial airplane. For a person who drives a million miles in a lifetime (somewhat above average) this amounts to a 1.5% chance of death.

There is a considerable and growing gap between the United States and other comparable countries in terms of roadway deaths, with the United States having higher death rates. In 2014, two different U.S. government estimated that there were 33,736 or 32,744 motor vehicle traffic deaths in 2014. The National Safety Council (NSC), a nonprofit safety advocacy group, estimates U.S. motor vehicle deaths in 2016 were 40,200, a 14% increase from its 2014 estimate. After decades of improvements in road safety for pedestrians, the pedestrian death rate in the United States has skyrocketed since 2009 while most comparable countries have experienced declining pedestrian death rates.

In 2020, fatalities increased to about 38,680 deaths, from about 36,000 in 2019, even with fewer drivers on the road and fewer miles traveled. The increase was attributed to more risky driving behavior, including speeding, failing to wear seat belts, and driving under the influence of drugs or alcohol. 2021 and 2022 experienced even more deaths, having 42,939 and 42,795 motor vehicle fatalities, respectively.

== Overall statistics ==
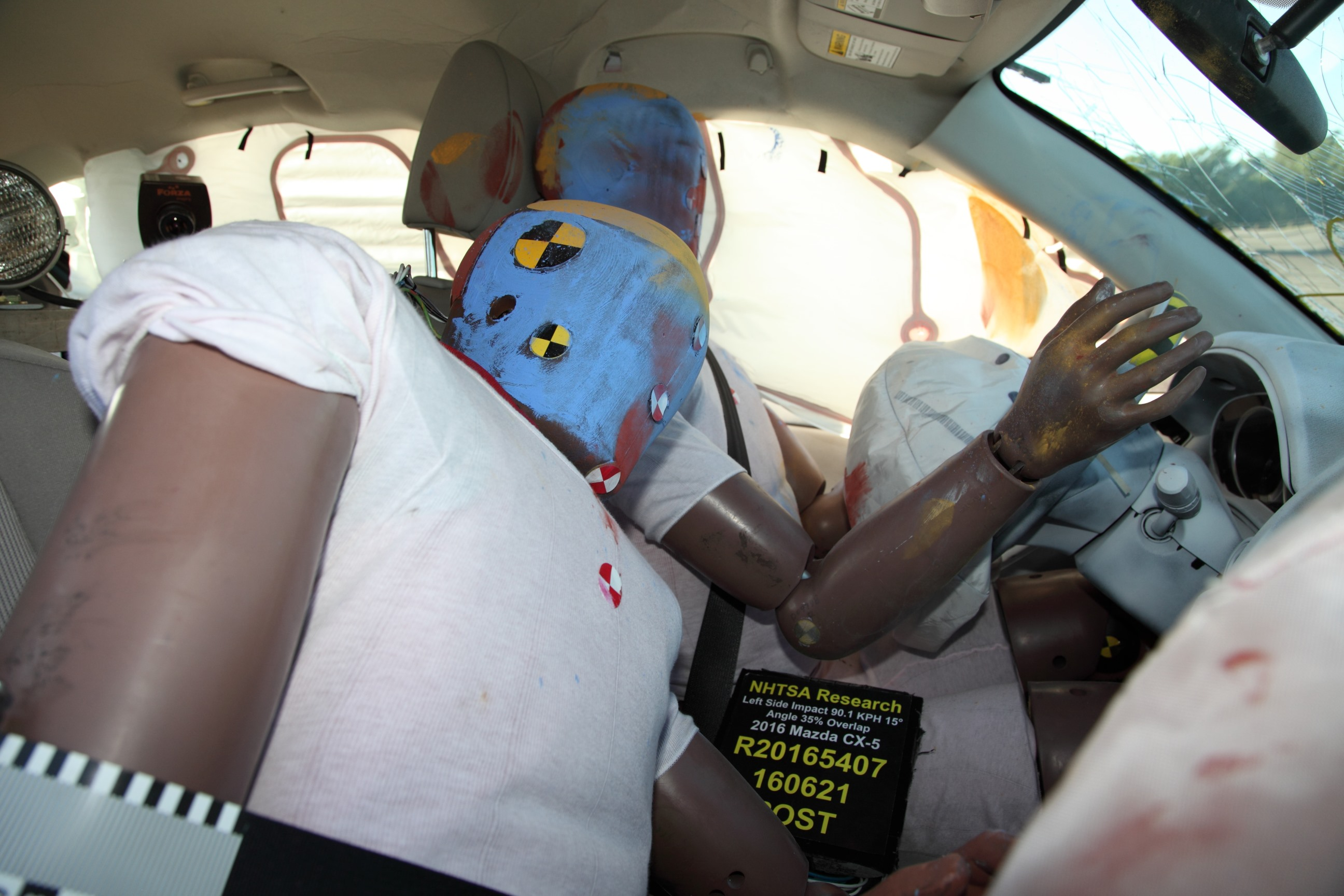
NHTSA test in a Mazda CX-5 crossover

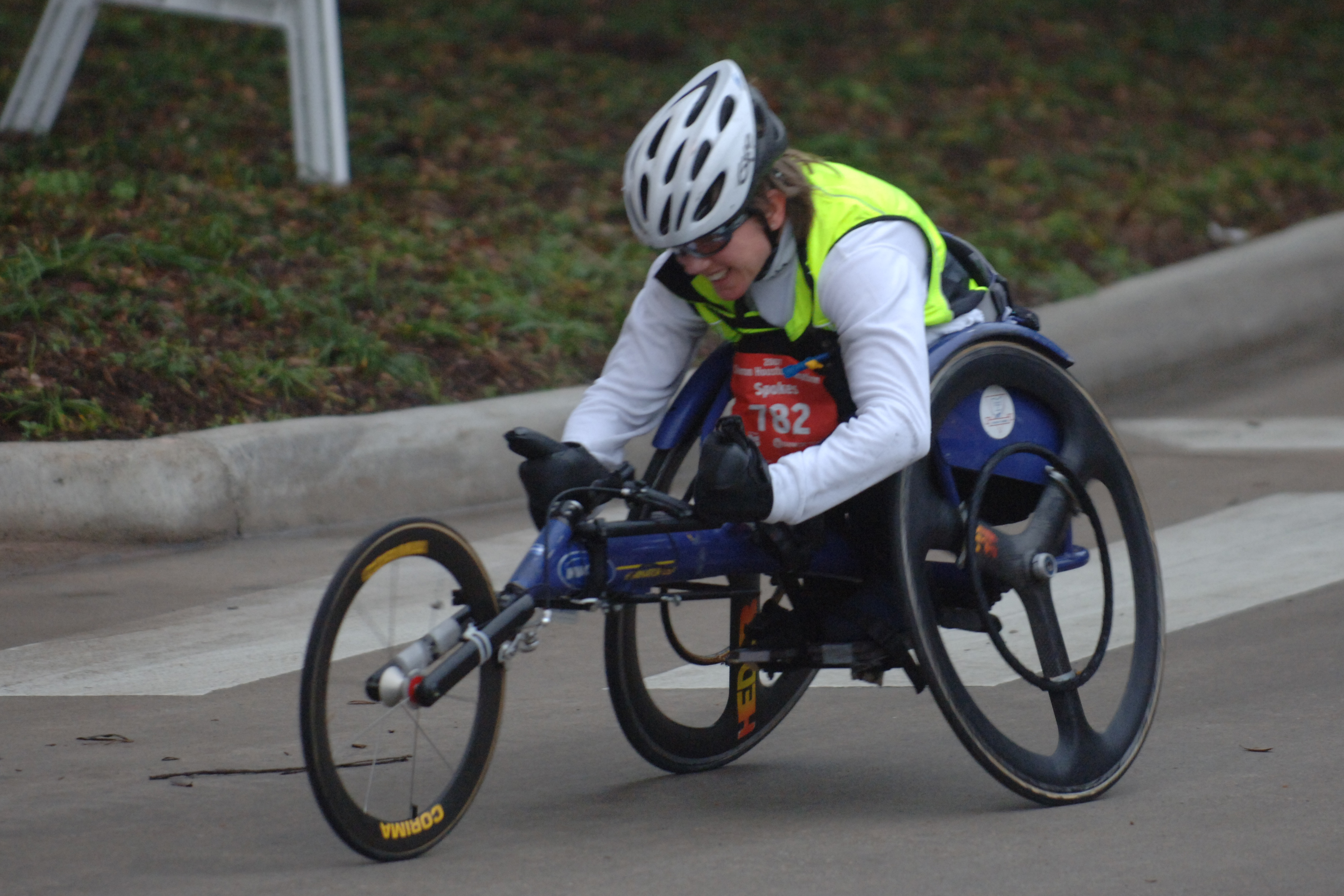
Holly Koester incurred a spinal injury as a result of a motor vehicle collision and is now a wheelchair racer.

In the United States, most fatalities are generated by road vehicles.

View source data.
View source data.
- Note: Train data is without trespassing; 1990–2010 and 2012–2014 are two different series and may not be compared.
- Source NTSB
  - For 2017
  - For 2014
  - For 2012, 2013
  - For 1990, 2000, 2009 and 2010, BTS

Safety overall has steadily improved in the United States for many decades. Between 1920 and 2000, the rate of fatal automobile crashes per vehicle-mile decreased by a factor of about 17. Except for a pause during the youth bulge of the 1960s (a time when many young, inexperienced drivers were on the road), progress in reducing fatal crashes has been steady. Safety for other types of U.S. passenger transportation has also improved substantially, but long-term statistical data are not as readily available. While the fatality rate roughly leveled off around 2000–2005 at around 1.5 fatalities per 100 million miles traveled, it has resumed a downward trend and reached 1.27 in 2008. The National Safety Council, using methodology that differs from the NHTSA, reports a rate (including deaths of pedestrians and cyclists killed in motor vehicle crashes) of 1.25 deaths per 100 million vehicle miles (or 12.5 deaths per billion vehicle miles) traveled in 2016.

View source data.
- Source: OECD
- 2017 NTSB
- 2019 pedestrian source: autoblog
- 2019 fatalities early estimates: NHTSA

Between 2008 and 2011, the economic recession, by a reduction in distance traveled, contributed to reducing fatalities.

=== Traffic safety by mode by traveled distance (public transportation) ===
View source data.
* Source, left: caranddriver, US Department Of Transport

== Government regulation ==
=== Federal organizations ===
Several federal organizations deal with transportation safety in the United States:

- The National Transportation Safety Board (NTSB) investigates accidents and makes recommendations to the regulatory agencies.
- The National Highway Traffic Safety Administration (NHTSA) in the United States Department of Transportation issues mandatory safety regulations for road vehicles.
- The Federal Highway Administration issues:
  - The Manual on Uniform Traffic Control Devices, which has mandatory nationwide standards for traffic signs and road markings
  - Road design standards for the Interstate Highway System
  - Technical recommendations for roads on federal property (like national parks and forests) and in the Indian Reservation Roads Program
- Safety standards for commercial motor carriers and motor vehicle operators are the responsibility of the Federal Motor Carrier Safety Administration (FMCSA).
- Railroad safety is the province of the Federal Railroad Administration.
- Aviation safety is the responsibility of the Federal Aviation Administration (FAA);
- The Federal Transit Administration conducts oversight of public transport agency safety.
- Pipeline safety is the responsibility of the Pipeline and Hazardous Materials Safety Administration (PHMSA).
- Safe transportation of hazardous materials is the responsibility PHMSA.
- Marine safety is the responsibility of the U.S. Coast Guard within the Department of Homeland Security.
- Offshore pipeline safety is the responsibility of the Bureau of Safety and Environmental Enforcement within the Department of the Interior.
- Workplace safety, including the safety of transportation workers, is the responsibility of the Occupational Safety and Health Administration within the Department of Labor. However, because states have separate sovereignty, their workers are not necessarily subject to federal work safety requirements.
- Transport of hazardous waste is generally subject to regulation by PHMSA, but is subject to additional regulation by the Environmental Protection Agency.
- The Nuclear Regulatory Commission sets standards for the design and manufacture of packages containing radioactive materials, while PHMSA regulates actual transport of the materials.

=== State and local responsibilities ===
State, territorial, tribal, and local governments are responsible for road design, speed limits, and traffic law enforcement for most roads. Many but not all states have vehicle inspection programs and vehicle regulations in addition to the NHTSA standards.

The FHA's Manual on Uniform Traffic Control Devices is mandatory for all roads "open for public travel", but states may have supplementary regulations. The federal government is the primary funding source for the Interstate Highway System and regulates it more stringently, even though it is maintained and operated by state governments. Some roads are directly federally owned and operated, including those in the Indian Reservation Roads Program and on federal property (such as nationals parks and forests).

The American Association of State Highway and Transportation Officials is a collaboration of state governments that publishes voluntary standards to help coordinate road design across jurisdictions.

Many state and local jurisdictions have adopted Vision Zero programs, with the goal of reducing transportation fatalities to zero.

== United States compared to other nations ==
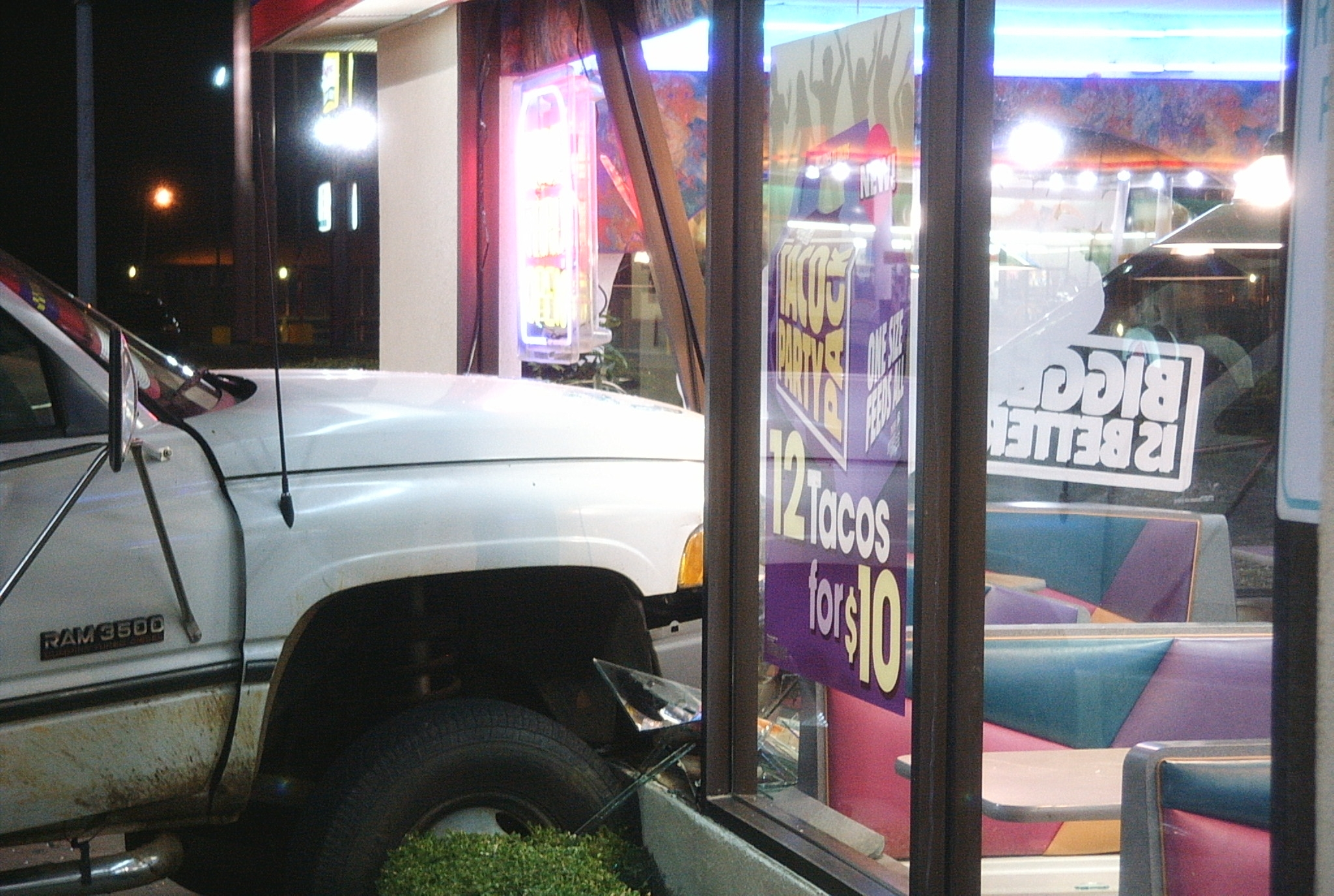
A Dodge Ram 3500 rams into a Taco Bell in autumn 2010.

The US ranks 41 out of 52 high-income nations based on road traffic deaths. US safety results are better than Russia, Saudi Arabia or Qatar. Nonetheless the fatality rate in the United States is high relative to most other high-income nations. The 2013 U.S. rate of 7.1 road fatalities per 1 billion vehicle-km is about double the 2013 rate in Sweden, which was 3.5 road fatalities per 1 billion vehicle-km. (See: List of countries by traffic-related death rate.) The United States has been called "the most dangerous of wealthy nations for a child to be born into".

This differences might be linked to a lack of traffic calming, higher prevalence of wide, multilane stroads which encourage high speeds, reliance on stop signs instead of roundabouts, as well as a difference of approach in driving safety culture, for instance in the balance between liberty and mandatory or forbidden dangerous or unsafe behavior.

To some extent this is due to geography and driver training, but more rigorous impaired driving enforcement and severe penalties in Sweden for driving under the influence may also explain the difference. While it might be argued that highways and vehicles in Sweden are different from those in the United States, the U.S. fatality rate is also about double the rate in the Canadian province of Ontario, which experienced 3.6 road fatalities per 1 billion vehicle-km according to preliminary 2014 data. Ontario, which is a vast province of more than 1 million square kilometers, has a similar mix of highway types including congested urban and rural highways. Ontario also has a similar mix of large transport trucks essentially identical to U.S. transport trucks, full-size pickup trucks, SUVs and passenger cars, although there may be more small cars driven in Ontario compared to the United States. This suggests that differences in fatality rates are due to non-physical factors such as driver behavior.

Comparing motorways (controlled-access, divided highways) in Europe and the United States, according to 2012 data, Denmark had the safest motorways with a rate of 0.72 road fatalities per 1 billion vehicle-km, while the United States had 3.38 road fatalities per 1 billion vehicle-km on its Interstate-type highways, often called freeways.

In Germany the death rate on such highways was 1.74 road fatalities per 1 billion vehicle-km, about half the U.S. rate for Interstate-type highways. In Germany significant sections to the Autobahn network do not have mandatory speed limits, when according to the German Road Safety Council (DVR) the number of deaths per kilometer of motorway is 30% lower when motorways have speed limit.

Another difference between the US and Europe is that Europeans believe higher speed limits have an adverse impact on safety. For instance, in 2008 an ETSC report considers that «empirical evidence indicates that all instances of introduced speed limits on German motorways have caused very large casualty reductions.». According to the ETSC, in Germany, fatalities per kilometer of motorway is not linked to speed limit, but speed limit sections allows higher traffic volumes for a similar number of fatalities. That means that fatalities per traveled distance is lower where there are speed limits.

=== Road safety compared to European Union nations ===
Until the 1980s, the US had lower road death rates than European countries. Most European countries have consistently improved their road safety since then, and now have lower rates than the US.

View source data.
- UE: Source UE
- United-States: Source OCDE/ITF for 1990, 2000 and 2010–2015 period (killed after 30 days)
- EU28, ETSC
- IIHS 2016 series.
- IIHS 2017 series.
- EU-27, source eurostat
- EU-27, 2020 preliminary estimate, European commission

In 2020, fatalities increased to nearly 38,680 in the US due to fewer people driving on the road. The same year, fatalities decreased to 18,800 in the EU, due to fewer people driving on the road. That year there was 115% more fatalities in the US than in the EU, or 53% less in the EU than in the US.

=== Road safety compared to other UNECE nations by population ===
With 114 fatalities per million inhabitants in 2017, the United States has a lower fatality rate than Kyrgyzstan (147 per million inhabitants), Georgia (139 per million inhabitants) and Kazakhstan (115 per million inhabitants).

Killed by population in 2019
View source data.
* source British statistics

=== Cultural and political differences ===
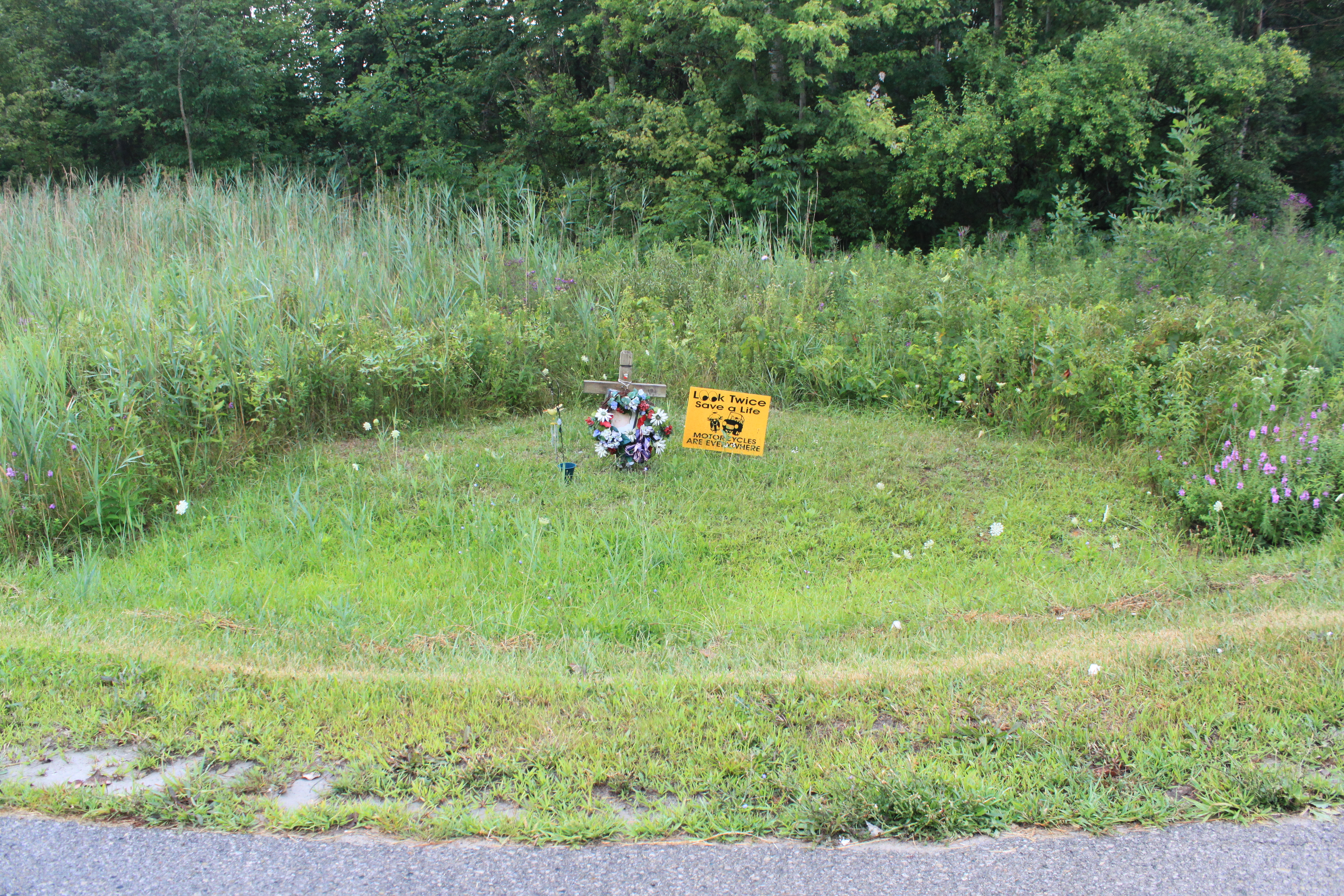
A memorial in the State of Michigan to a person who died in a motorcycle accident

==== Automated enforcement ====
Red light and speed limit enforcement cameras are used in about half of U.S. states, and overall the country has been slower to adopt the technology than many other wealthy nations. Public opposition largely centers around the use of the cameras to raise revenue, with complaints that yellow lights are intentionally short (which has specified in some contracts for privately-run systems) or cameras are miscalibrated (as happened in San Francisco) and ticket drivers unfairly. Despite claims to the contrary, many studies have found the technology reduces crashes overall, especially dangerous "T-bone" right-angle crashes, but some have found that at the same time they can increase the number of rear-end collisions when inattentive or speeding drivers slam on the brakes to avoid a ticket. Other concerns include privacy and racial bias as to where the cameras are placed.

Though automated enforcement has been challenged as unconstitutional in various ways, courts have generally not upheld these claims. A red light program in St. Louis, Missouri was struck down by the state supreme court because it presumed the owner of the vehicle was driving. The 2012 transportation bill banned federal funding for automated traffic enforcement outside of school zones, continuned by the 2016 transportation bill. The 2021 Infrastructure Investment and Jobs Act reversed this ban and included $1.56 billion in funding that could be used for this or other transportation safety purposes. The Governors Highway Safety Association issued a report with recommendations for addressing community concerns:

- Use revenue only to fund the system and other traffic safety measures
- Install cameras only where justified by crash data, and also deploy other safety improvements
- Engage the community in the planning process and widely publicize the locations chosen along with selection criteria
- Make agreements with neighboring states so out-of-state drivers cannot avoid fines

==== Lack of strong road safety oversight ====
While strong regulation by the Federal Aviation Administration has dramatically reduced aviation accidents, federal regulation for road safety is weak, and many matters are left up to the states. Congress sometimes uses financial incentives to encourage states to adopt certain safety measures, but this can result in slow adoption, or backsliding when the financial incentives end.

=== Safety compared to other nations by traveled distance ===
==== Traffic safety compared to other nations by traveled distance ====
View source data.
- Source: caranddriver, US Department Of Transport
- source OECD

Killed by traveled km 2016
View source data.
* source OECD

The US national strategy and target is 6.34 killed per 100 million vehicle kilometers traveled in end 2019

==== Train safety compared to other nations by traveled distance ====
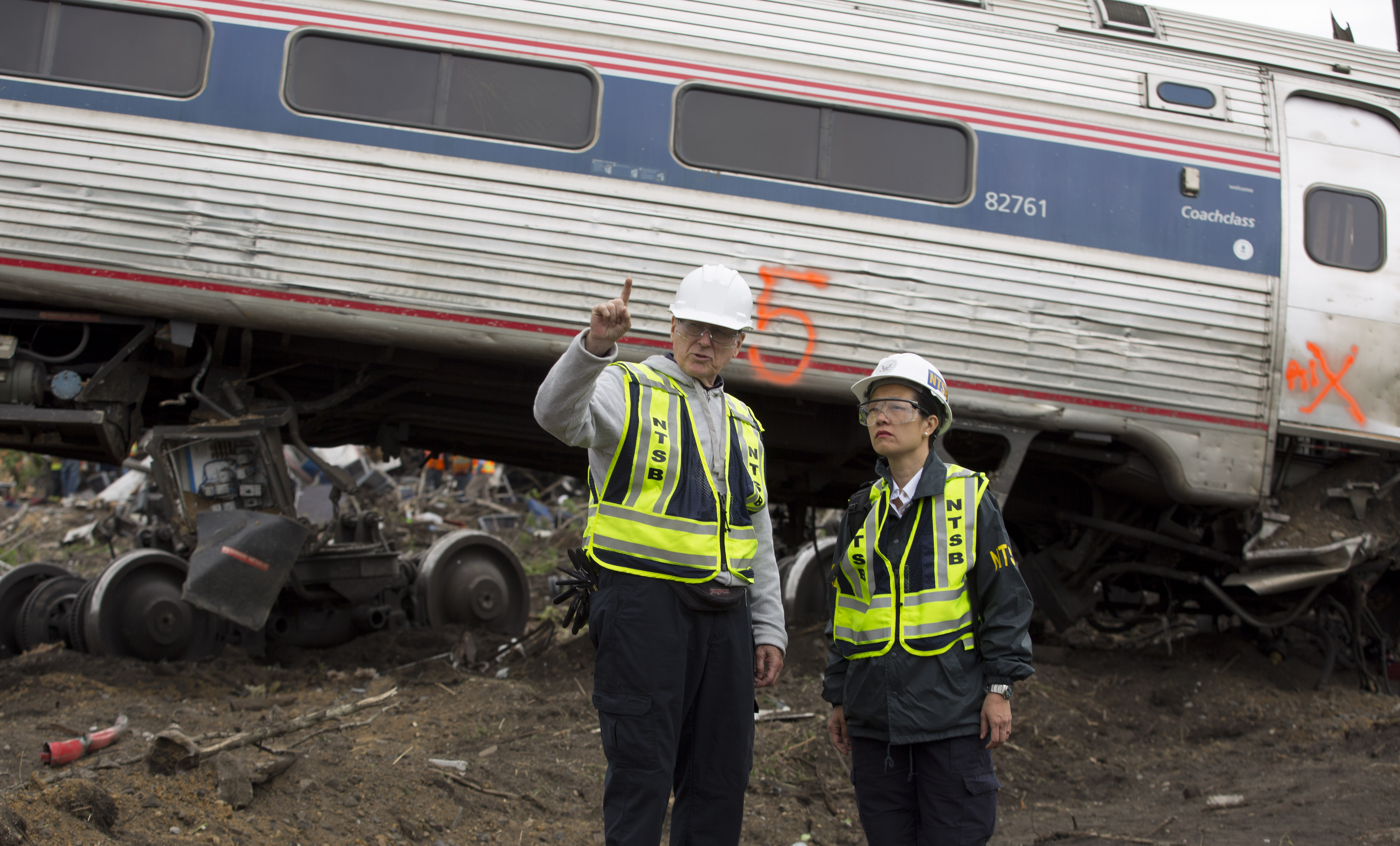
NTSB investigators on-scene at the 2015 Philadelphia train derailment

View source data.	View source data.
Source: OECD, 2001–2006	Source European Union Agency for Railways Source of data: US: Annual report FRA; Canada: Transport Safety Board; South Korea: KMMI; Australia: Annual report. In case of South Korea and Australia, the reference period is fiscal year, not calendar year. Passenger kilometres data for Canada and Japan taken from the oECD transport database

=== Compared to Canada ===
US trend is less favorable for the US than for Canada due to various factors such as vehicle, speed camera, transit, gasoline price and traveled distance.

== Road safety ==
In 2021, road deaths were more common per one million inhabitants in the United States than in all other OECD countries. The National Highway Traffic Safety Administration previously attributed most of these deaths to human error, but this has been criticized as misleading and inaccurate by the chair of the National Transportation Safety Board, Jennifer Homendy, as well as other safety advocates.

=== Road to Zero ===
Road to Zero is a Vision zero initiative which aims to reach zero fatalities by 2050.

=== Rural vs Urban ===
Rural fatalities considered by (million) VMT is 50% higher in rural areas than in urban area, in 2021.

From 2012 to 2021, yearly fatalities increased by 67% in urban area from 15371 people to 25598 people. In the same time, number of fatalities which occur each year decreased by 7% from 18367 people to 17103.

In the US, in 2016, there were 18590 rural fatalities and 17656 urban fatalities. Thus 48% of deaths were in urban areas, and 52% in rural areas. Taking into account traveled miles, there was a risk of 1.96 fatalities per 100 million traveled miles on rural roads, and a risk of 0.79 fatalities per 100 million traveled miles on urban roads.

In 2018, there were 16410 rural fatalities and 19499 urban fatalities, and 651 unlocated fatalilites. Thus 53% of deaths were in urban areas, 45% in rural areas, and 2% unlocated.

In 2021, there were 17103 rural fatalities and 25598 urban fatalities, and 238 unlocated fatalilites. Thus 60% of deaths were in urban areas, 40% in rural areas, and 2% unlocated.

In other countries, the rates were:

- 47% killed in urban areas (speed limit lower than 60 km/h) in Canada in 2016, and 53% killed in rural area (speed limit upper than 60 km/h)
- 37% killed on urban streets (speed limit usually lower than 50 km/h, except in Poland) in the European Union in 2015, with 8% on motorways and 55% on rural non motorway roads (speed limit usually upper than 50 km/h).
View source data.
View source data.

View source data.	View source data.

View source data.

During the 2010–2019 decade,

- rural roads became safer from 18,089 fatalities in 2010 to 16,340 one in 2019 for a same traveled distance;
- urban roadway deaths increased by 34 percent while urban distance traveled increased 15 percent:
  - pedestrian fatalities increased by 62%,
  - cyclist fatalities increased by 49%.

=== Fatality rates by state ===
As of 2019, Mississippi and Alabama lead the rate of motor vehicle deaths in the US by state with 25.2 and 20.6 deaths respectively per 100,000 population. The death rate per 100 million miles traveled in 2015 ranged from 0.52 in Massachusetts to 1.89 in South Carolina. (The Massachusetts rate translates to about 3.25 fatalities per 1 billion vehicle-km. The South Carolina rate translates to about 11.8 fatalities per 1 billion vehicle-km.) In South Carolina, North Dakota and Texas, more than 40% of road fatalities were attributed to driving under the influence (DUI). A plot of vehicle-miles traveled per capita vs fatalities per 100,000 population shows Montana, South Carolina and West Virginia as outliers with higher than expected fatalities. Enforcement and compliance with seat belt laws varies by state. (Massachusetts, which had the lowest death rate per 100 million miles traveled in 2015, was among the states with the lowest use of seat belts.) Some states require motorcycle helmets while others do not, and the states of Illinois, Iowa and New Hampshire have no helmet laws at all. Speed limits, traffic density, topography, climate and many other factors affect the divergent accident rates by state. Speed limits in Texas, Utah, and Rhode Island are prima facie rather than absolute. This allows motorists in those states to defend against a speeding charge if it can be proven that the speed was reasonable and prudent. In good driving conditions, many drivers in prima facie states presume (usually correctly) that police will allow some tolerance in enforcement. Even in states with absolute speed limits, enforcement and penalties vary from one state to another. For these and other reasons, state-to-state comparisons are difficult. There are many studies examining increases in Interstate speed limits from 55 mph to 65, 70 and 75 mph. Some found that fatality rates increased significantly on Interstate highways where speed limits were raised. One study that examined the change from 55 to 65 mph found higher Interstate speed limits improved overall highway safety by drawing traffic from less safe secondary highways to safer Interstate highways. Since the changes to 80 mph speed limits in some states (and 85 mph on one section of a toll highway in Texas) are relatively recent, robust analysis is not yet available. Anecdotal evidence suggests actual vehicle speeds did not increase as much as speed limits did. Also, police may be enforcing the new higher limits more strictly than they enforced the prior limits. In some states, police have reallocated resources to focus more on impaired and distracted driving. The higher speed limits are predominantly in rural states, which tend to be Republican states. To many Republican voters, speed limits (and seat belt laws) are seen as intrusions on personal liberty. According to transportation historian Owen Gutfreund, state governments may raise speed limits because raising the speed limit “sounds like such an easy regulatory win.” It's a simple way to “get government out of your face.”

On the other hand, according to the Insurance Institute for Highway Safety, Farmer performed a new study comparing deaths per billion miles traveled by state and roadway type — between 1993 and 2013 — on rural roads (the study does not cover the urban roads) concluded that each 5 mph (8 km/h) increase in the maximum speed limit is related to a 4 percent fatalities increase on some roads and an 8 percent increase on interstates and freeways. Anyway such effect and safer cars mitigate together.

=== By class of road users ===
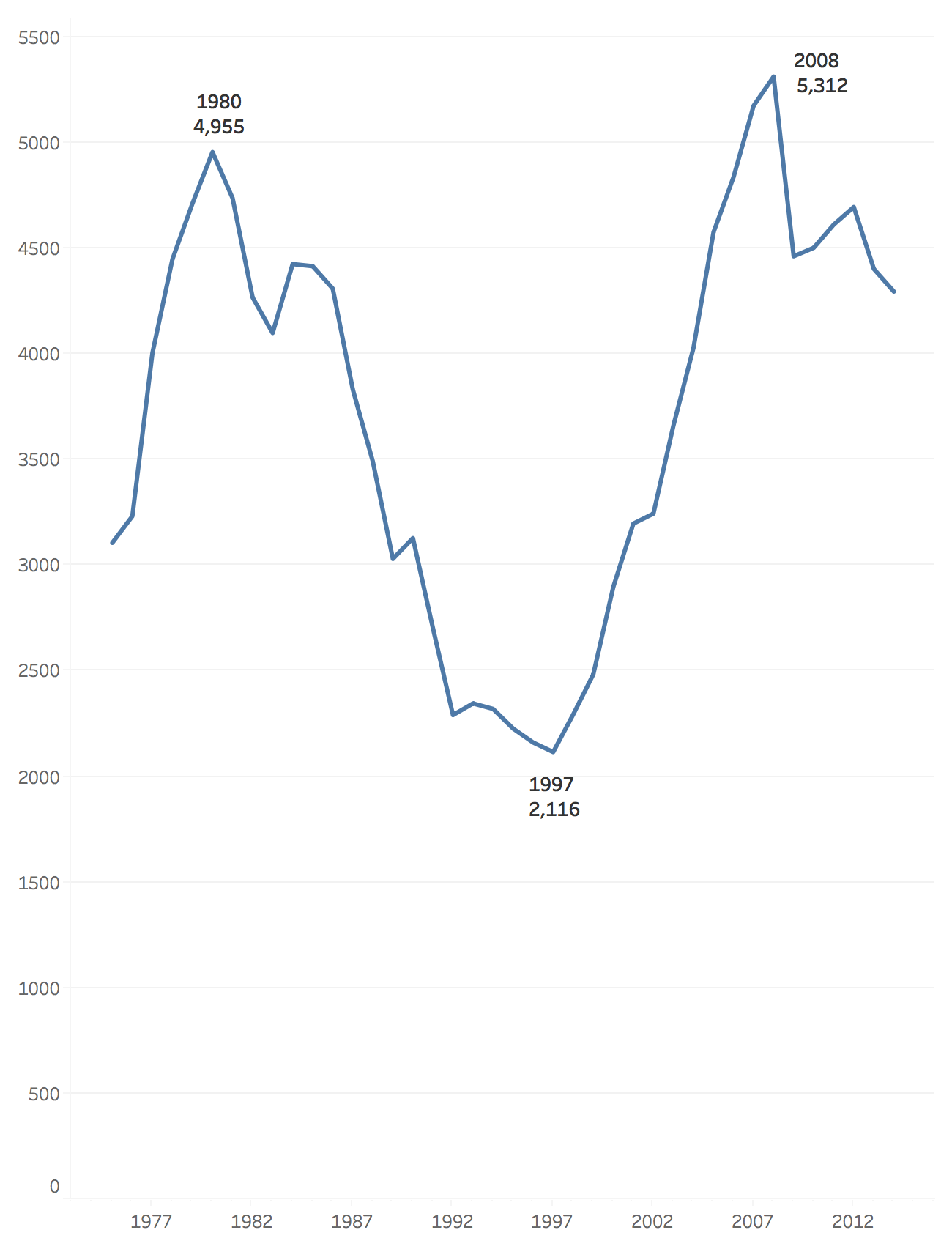
Motorcycle fatality rate in U.S. by year

Class of road user involved in crash death vary from state to state. Anyway, in 2016, amongst many US states, Wyoming has a higher percentage of deaths involving occupants of SUVs and pickups, Massachusetts has highest proportions of car occupant deaths, District of Columbia has the highest percentage of motorcyclist deaths. The District of Columbia and New York have the highest percentage of pedestrian deaths.

Motor vehicle crash deaths by road user type, 2016
Motor vehicle crash deaths by road user type, 2016

Source IIHS.

Vehicles involved in fatal crash, 2018, source NHTSA
View source data.
Source NHTSA

Although the number of motorcyclist deaths is lower than car occupants, it is greater by traveled distance.

* Source, NHTSA

=== Pedestrians and cyclists ===
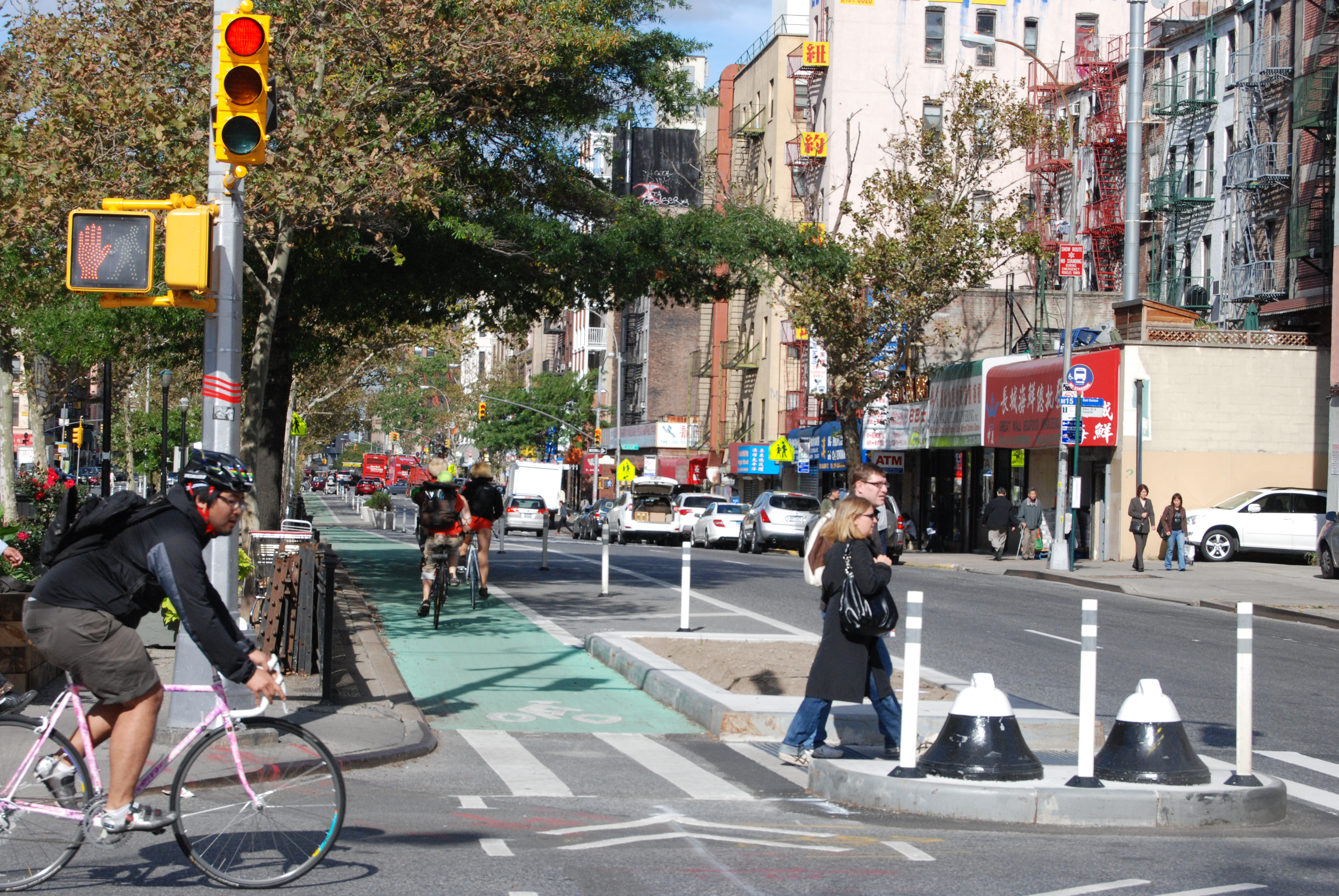
Dedicated cycling facility in New York City

As cars have become safer for occupants (due to airbags, structural crashworthiness and other improvements) the percent of pedestrian fatalities as a percent of total motor vehicle fatalities steadily increased from 11% in 2004 to 15% in 2014 according to NHTSA data. Bicyclists accounted for 2 percent of all traffic deaths in 2014.

Pedestrians killed (Piéton tués) (2014)
Pedestrians killed in 2014, in %, by light level

Source GHSA (based on Analysis Reporting System (FARS) as published by the National Highway Traffic Safety)

Killed US pedestrian per million
View source data.
Source GHSA

=== Large trucks ===
According to the IIHS rear crash safety of large trucks could be improved by 44% with forward collision warning systems and by 41% with automatic emergency braking.

In the US, automated emergency braking (AEB) is not mandatory for heavy vehicles while it is in the European Union.

View source data.
View source data.

=== Rates per driver's license ===
One can also calculate auto fatalities per driver's license. From 1990 to 2009, this number has also been improving: from 1 death per 3,745 driver's licenses in 1990 to 1 per 6,200 driver's licenses in 2009. Crowded, traffic-choked Northeastern cities including Washington, D.C., Baltimore, Boston, Providence, Philadelphia, Newark, Hartford, New Haven, Springfield and Worcester, Massachusetts, were most likely to have car accidents. The NHTSA through its Fatality Analysis Reporting System stated that auto fatalities continue to be the leading cause of death for young adults.

=== Risk factors ===
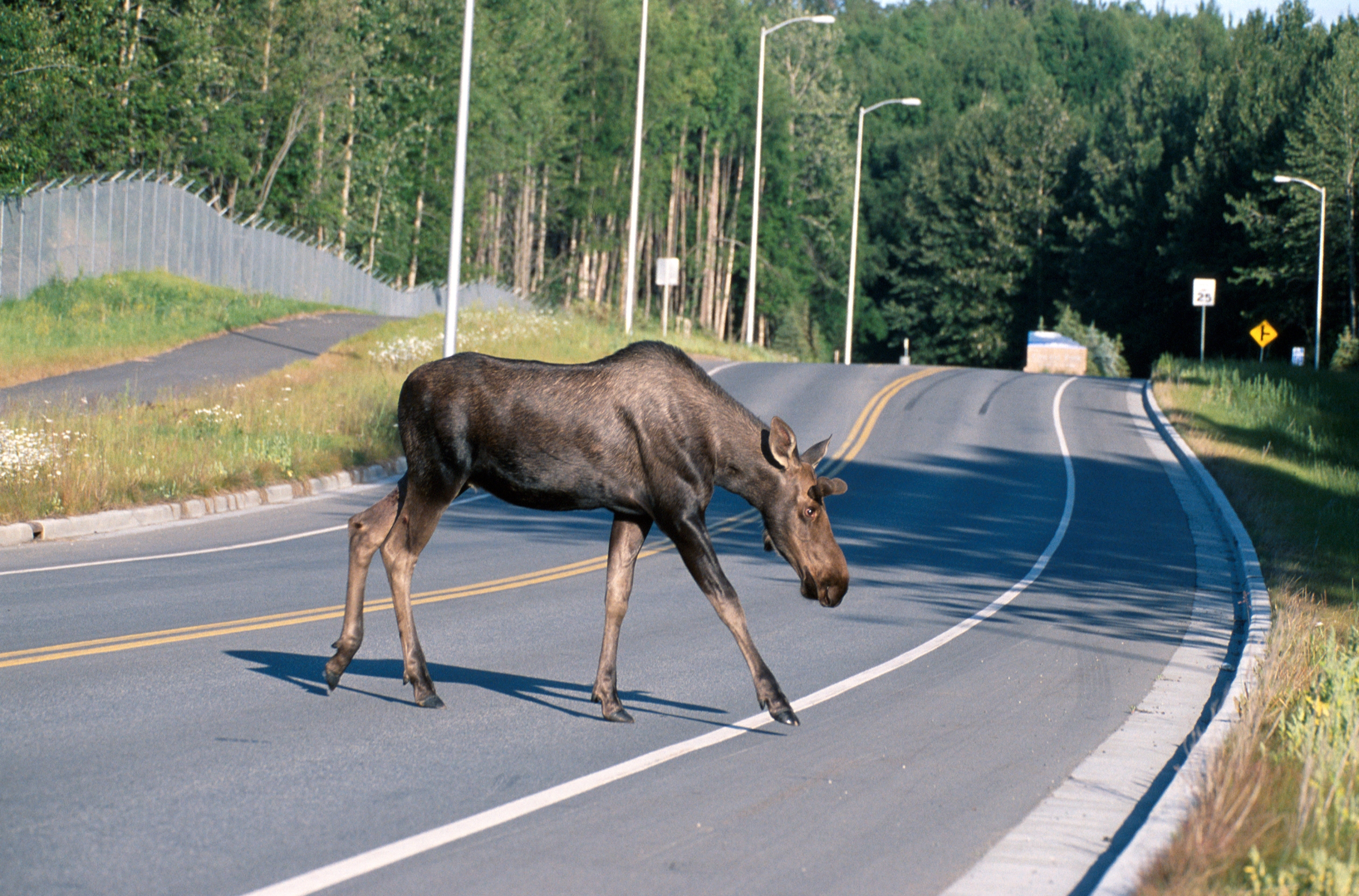
Moose (A. a. gigas) crossing a road in Alaska

Rural non-Interstate highways are particularly risky. Most are two-lane non-divided highways built to lower standards than Interstate highways. Drivers are more likely to be drunk or not wearing seat belts. Speeding is common. Deer, elk and moose crossing the highway add to the risk compared to urban highways. In the event of an accident in a remote area, injured victims may not receive emergency medical care in time to save their lives.

Many accidents when driving personal vehicles are caused by distracted driving. According to the American Automobile Association (AAA), distraction plays a factor in 60% of moderate to serious teen car crashes. Specifically, passenger and cell phone interaction accounted for 27% of crashes, the leading cause. Drivers looking away from the target (roadway) also accounted for 19%.

Non-use of seat belts is a significant risk factor. According to Col. Tom Butler, chief of the Montana Highway Patrol, preliminary 2015 data indicated that 178 of the 224 vehicle occupant fatalities were of individuals not wearing seat belts. The fine in Montana for not wearing a seat belt in 2015 was $20. Although speed limits increased from 75 mph to 80 mph on rural interstates that year, the biggest statewide increase in both crashes and deaths occurred on secondary roads. Forty-three people died on Montana two-lane roads outside of towns that are neither U.S. or state highways.

Average trip duration may be greater in rural states, which may mean driver fatigue is a more salient risk factor in rural states than in more densely populated states. Most data on the number of hours driven in a day and accident rates is for commercial drivers who are required to keep driving logs. (See next section.)

Human factor is one of the more significant in various factors leading to fatalities.

With the increase in the volume of American cars, the number of deaths of drivers and passengers inside these rolling castles has decreased by 22%. But the number of pedestrians has increased by 57%. If Americans had stuck to smaller vehicles, 8,000 pedestrian lives would have been saved between 2000 and 2018, estimates Justin Tyndall, assistant professor of economics at the University of Hawaii.

Crash Contributing Factors in Florida (1998–2000)
Primary and Secondary Crash Contributing Factors	Human factor
View source data.	View source data.
Source FDOT

According to FDOT:

- «When speeding is compared to fault, drivers traveling at any speed over 4 MPH over the posted limit were highly overrepresented in fault. As the amount of speeding increases, the degree of overrepresentation increases; however, even at 5–9 miles over the limit, drivers were overrepresented in fault by a factor of over 2.0. ».
- «drinking drivers were between 3.5 and 18 times as likely to be at fault in the crash, depending on the amount of alcohol ingested. »

Alcohol and Speed Over representation on faults in Florida (1998–2000)
Alcohol influence	Speed influence
View source data.	View source data.
ORF for Over representation factor compares the rate of fault for a specific characteristic against the rate of fault for those without this characteristic. ORF greater than 1 means the risk is greater. ORF equal to one means the risk is not changed. When few data is available confidence interval is not accurate. For instance, a speed excess between 5 and 9 mph multiply the risk of fault by two.
Source FDOT

=== Cause ===
Several causes are involved:

Cause	NHTSA 2018 labeling	NHTSA 2018 Fatal driver crashes	
Cause	NHTSA 2018 labeling	Numbers	%
Tourists
Distracted driving	Distracted Driver	2,688	5.22
Drunk driving	BAC .08+ g/dL	10,011	19.44
Speeding	Speeding	12,974	25.2
Reckless driving
Rain	Rain (Mist)	4,202	8.16
Running red lights (traffic light)
Night driving	Dark, more or less lighted	22,517	43.73
Design defects
Tailgating
Wrong-way driving or improper turns
Teenage drivers	Aged 15–20	6,944	13.49
Drugs
Potholes	Poor road conditions (puddle, pothole, ice, etc.)	208	0.4
...	MHE Utility Pole + supports	962	1.87
...	MHE Tree	3,305	6.42
Tire blowouts	Blow out/flat tire	165	0.32
Animal crossings (deer–vehicle collisions)	MHE Live Animal	130	0.25
Animal crossings (deer–vehicle collisions)	Pre crash event: Animal in road	245	0.48
Construction sites	Work zone	1179	2.29

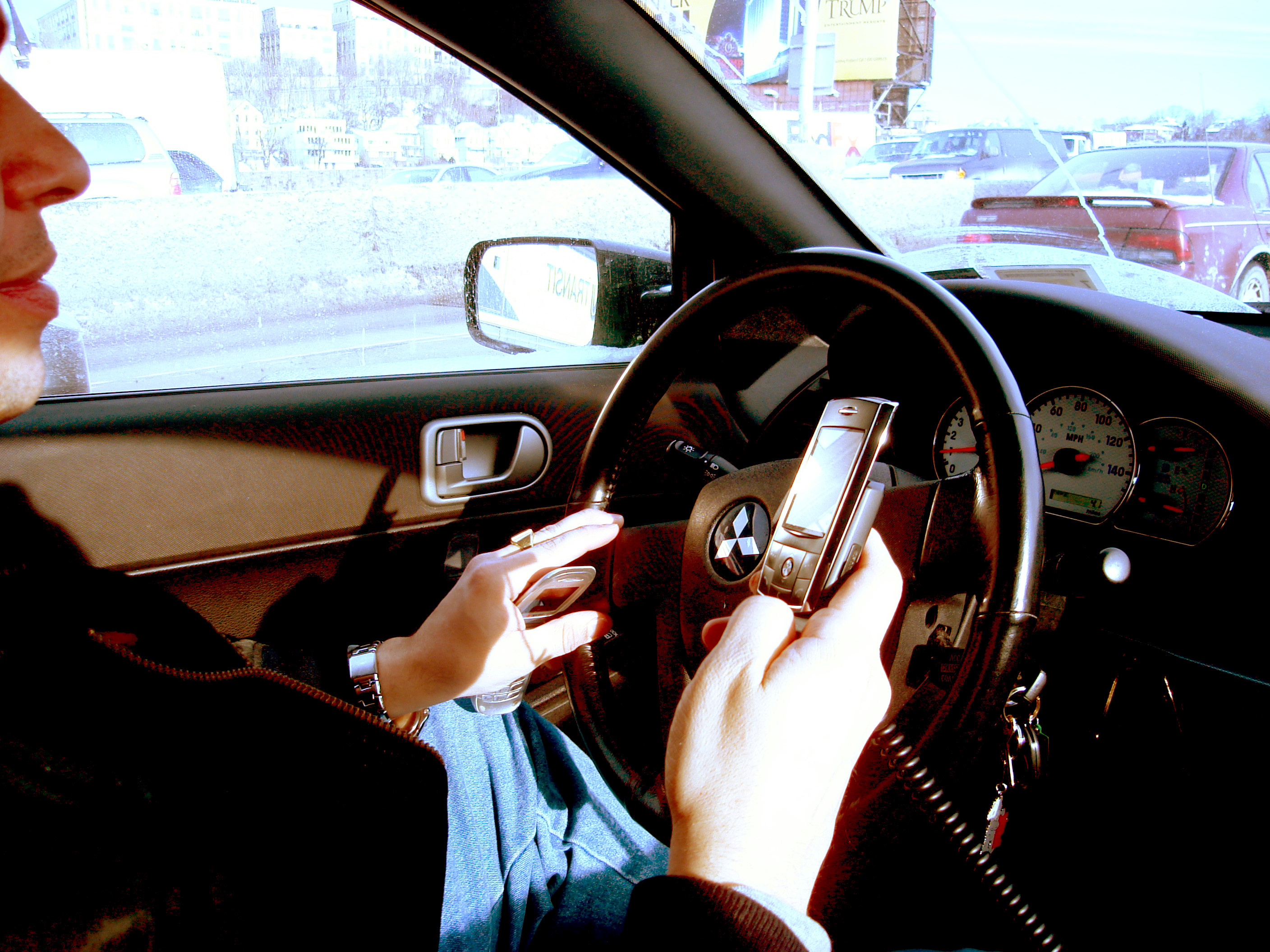
Distracted driving, a chief concern with mobile phone usage

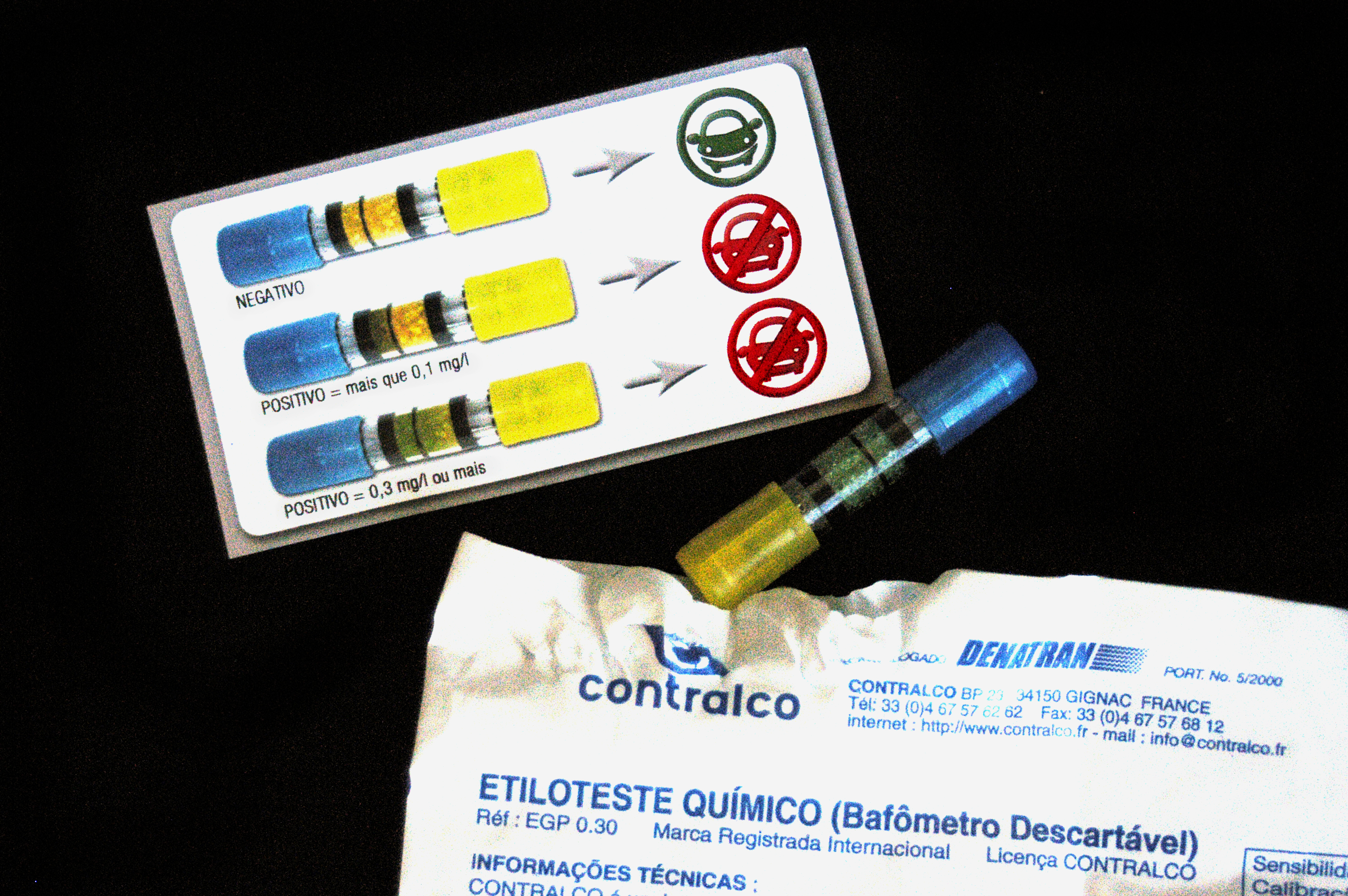
Single usage Éthylotest

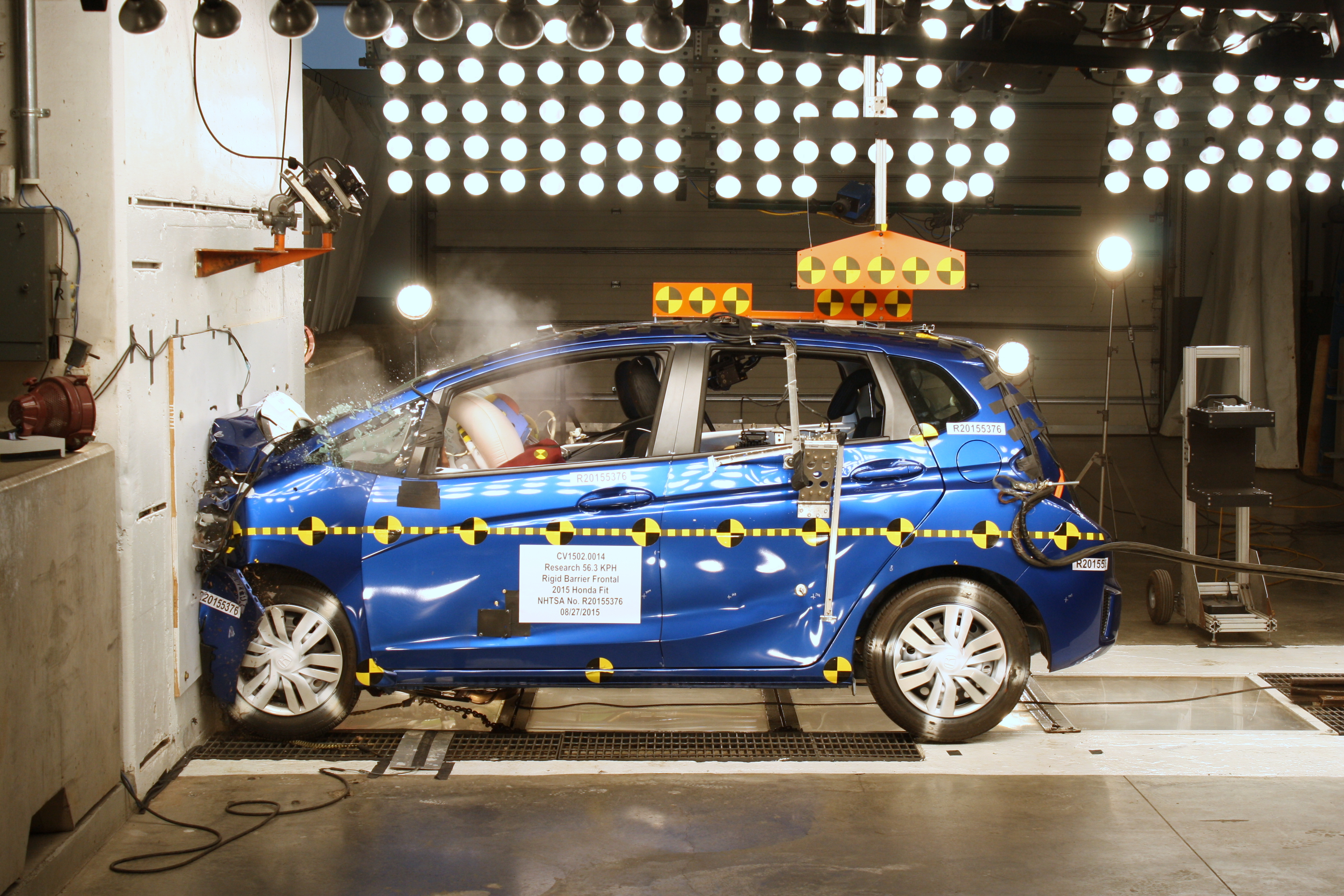
2016 Honda Fit striking a wall head-on at 56 km/h

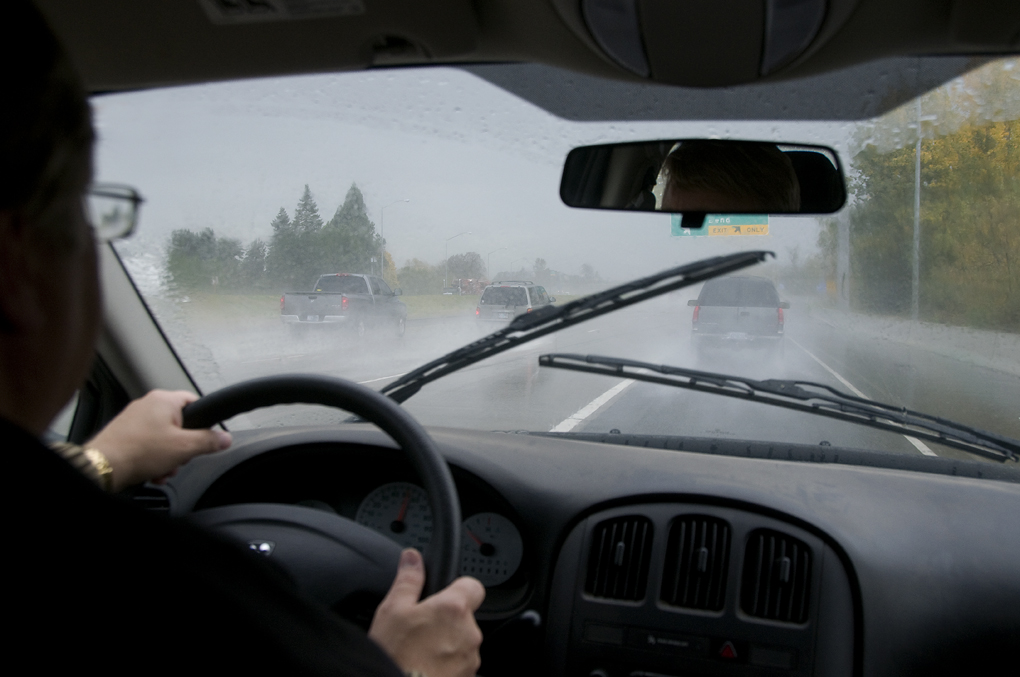
Driving in the rain

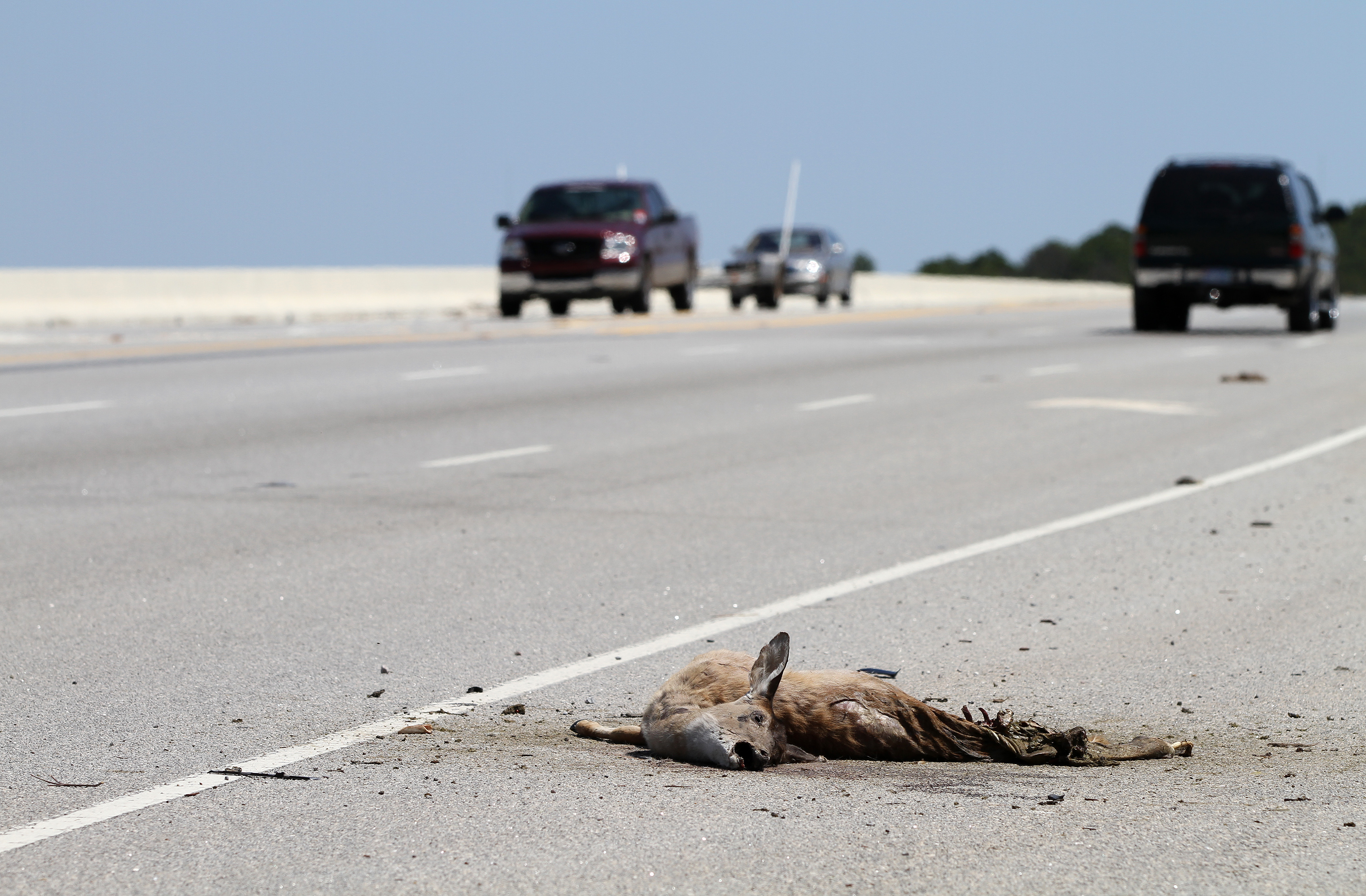
Roadkilled deer on the Okatie Highway, South Carolina, US

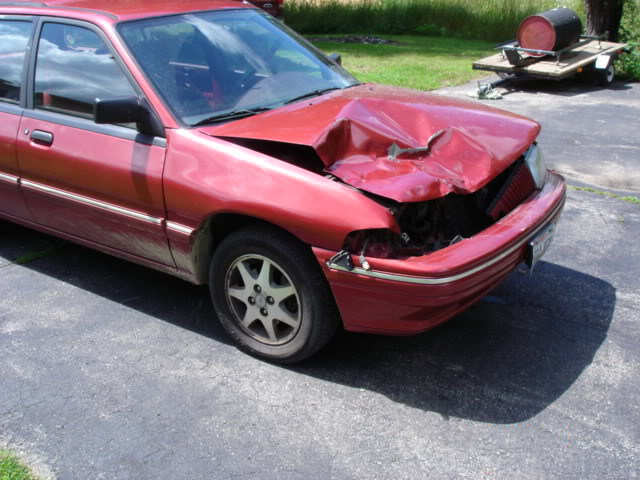
A car after colliding with a white-tailed deer in Wisconsin

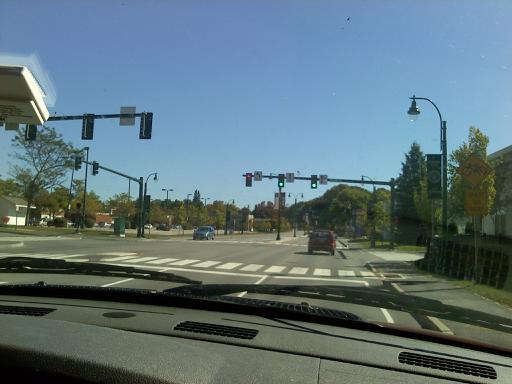
A traffic light in Westbrook, Maine. Notice the red arrow to the left of the two green straight lights.

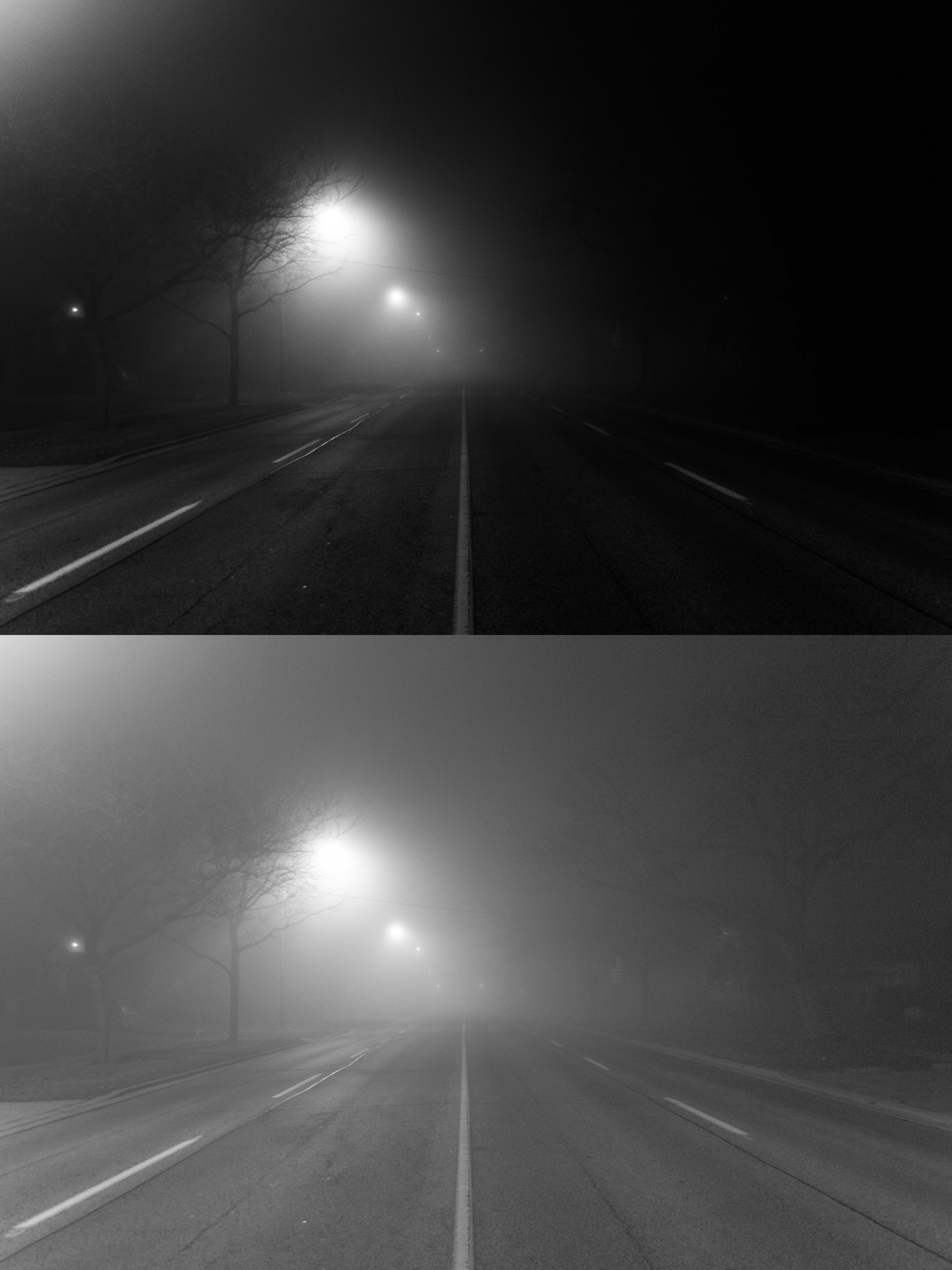
By night. Top: human; bottom: wider view

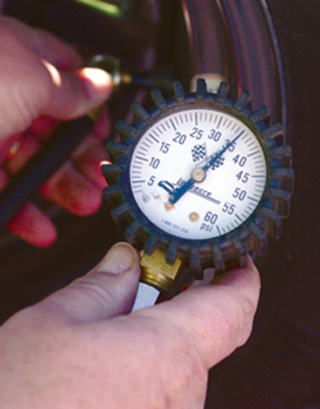
Tire pressure gauge

=== Age ===
View source data.
View source data.

=== Calendar factors ===
The five most fatal days count more the 115 yearly fatalities making at least 575 fatalities in a five years period.

Chart definition page not found.

View source data.
- July 4 is the Independence Day (United States). On that day, in the US, fatalities are 25% higher than a regular day, each year.
- November 1
- August 2
- October 25
- August 30

Chart definition page not found.

View source data.

Saturday is part of the weekend. On that day, in the US, fatalities are 20% higher than a regular day, each year.

=== Vehicle Miles Traveled (VMT) ===
The VMT may vary according to location; in 2021, it ranges from 0.31 in urban Vermont to 2.53 in rural South Carolina.

It is sometimes understood that fatalities increase with the increase of VMT, but this is not systematic as fatalities might remain quite stable while the VMT change.

USA	Minnesota
View source data.	View source data.
Between 1994 and 2007, VMT increased by 28% while fatalities remains stable (6%) variation, Between 2007 and 2009, VMT decreased by 2% while fatalities decreased by 20%, Since 2009 (to 2015), VMT increased by 4%, while fatalities increased by 3%,	Between 1961 and 1968, VMT increased by 32%, while fatalities increased by 45%, Between 1968 and 1982, VMT increased by 50%, while fatalities decreased by 50%, Between 1982 and 2003, VMT increased by 100%, while fatalities increased by 14%, Between 2003 and 2015, VMT increased by 2%, while fatalities decreased by 46%,
* Source NHTSA.	* Source Minnesota

== Modal comparison ==
When U.S. fatalities occurring in motor vehicles versus mass transit are compared, the difference is enormous. According to the cited study, there are more than 30,000 deaths each year in the U.S. on public roads. For all types of mass transit there are less than 150 fatalities each year.

=== Driving versus flying ===
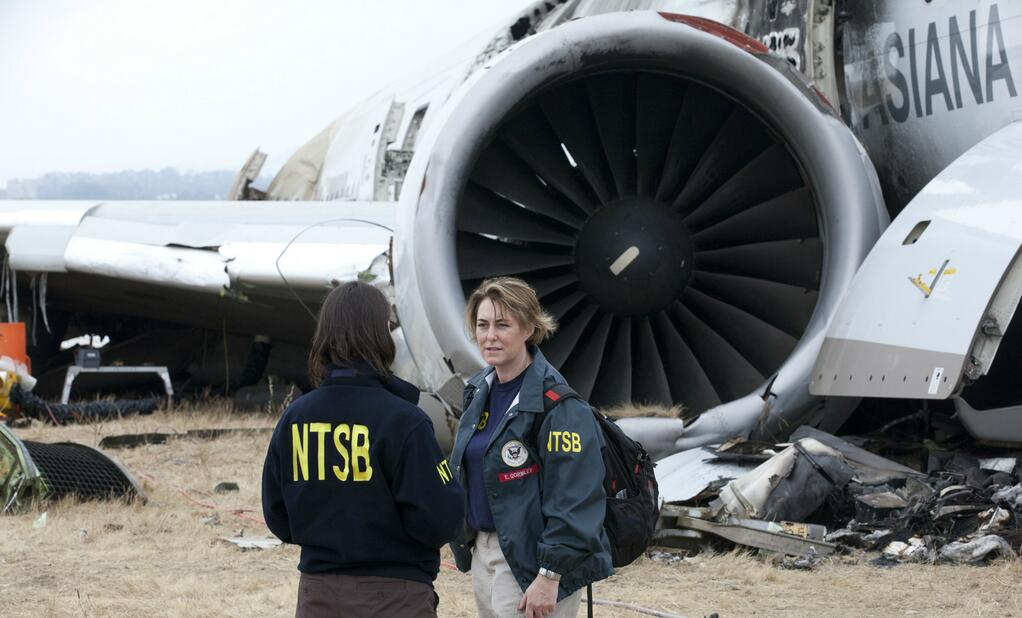
NTSB "go team" members at the Asiana Airlines Flight 214 crash site

The number of deaths per passenger-mile on commercial airlines in the United States between 2000 and 2010 was about 0.2 deaths per 10 billion passenger-miles, while for driving, the rate was 1.5 per 100 million vehicle-miles for 2000, which is 150 deaths per 10 billion miles for comparison with the air travel rate.

The per mile risk for vehicle transportation is therefore 750 times higher than the per mile risk for commercial air travel.

The greatest risk in flying is in takeoff and landing, meaning that longer aircraft trips are safer per mile. Commuter planes used on shorter flights have higher risk than larger jet aircraft. Driving on U.S. Interstate highways, which are almost always controlled-access divided highways, is safer than driving on most other roads and highways.

Unlike the large U.S. air carriers and commuter airlines, which on average have less than 20 fatalities annually, each year general aviation fatalities number in the hundreds. Most general aviation accidents involve single-engine, piston-powered airplanes used in recreational aviation.

=== Aviation vs rail ===
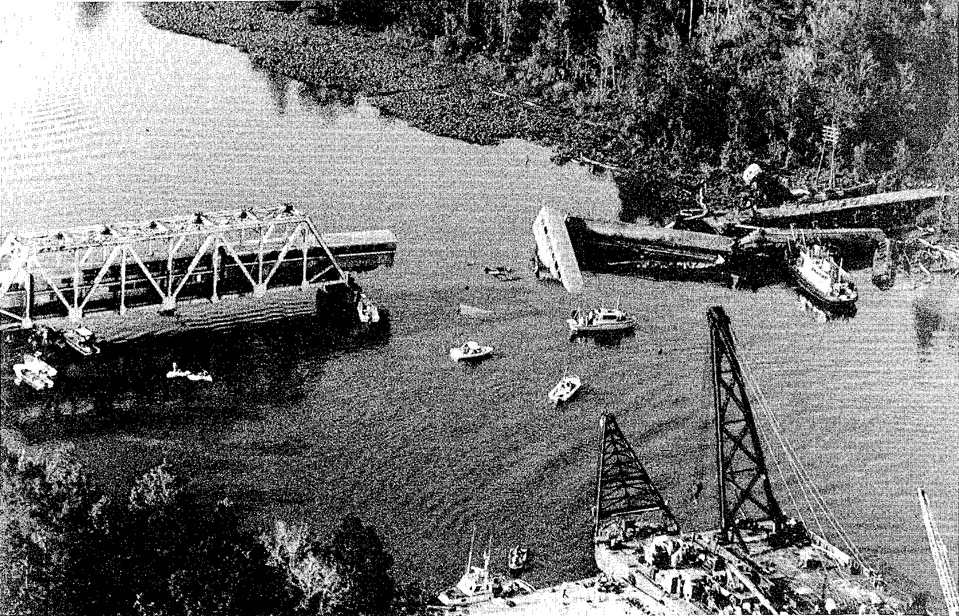
1993 Big Bayou Cannot train wreck

View source data.
- Source BTS

=== Rail and bus ===
Rail and bus (motorcoach) accidents also account for fatalities, although public transportation is far less dangerous than driving a personal vehicle.

From 2014 to 2016, fatal rail fatalities were 227, 234 and 231; with trespassers, fatalities are 749 for 2016.

View source data.
- Source BTS

== Pilots and drivers ==
A graph outlining the relationship between number of hours driven and the percent of commercial truck crashes related to driver fatigue. Source: Federal Motor Carrier Safety Administration

Driver fatigue is a concern, particularly for commercial drivers. Hours of service regulations are issued by the Federal Motor Carrier Safety Administration (FMCSA) and govern the working hours of anyone operating a commercial motor vehicle (CMV) in the United States. The relationship between number of hours driven and the percent of commercial truck crashes related to driver fatigue is an exponential relationship. (See graph.)

Although the accident rate per 100 million miles for professional truckers is low, the high number of miles driven by a truck driver makes truck driving a risky occupation. Trucking transportation occupations accounted for one quarter of all work-related fatalities in 2015, more than any other U.S. job, according to the U.S. Labor Department's Bureau of Labor Statistics' annual workplace fatality report. The fatal injury rate in 2015 was 14.7 per 100,000 full-time equivalent workers in transportation and material moving occupations (which includes both truckers and air transportation workers.) This was a significantly lower rate than for workers in farming, fishing, and forestry occupations, but high compared to most other occupation categories. The report did not break out the fatal injury rate per 100,000 full-time equivalent workers among aircraft pilots and flight engineers but did note that they had a high fatal injury rate compared to all workers. There were 57 fatalities among aircraft pilots and flight engineers in 2015.

== Safety by state ==
US mortality by state per million inhabitant in 2013
View source data.
source citylab:

Between 2006 and 2015, number of killed people changed from 42642 to 35092 (−17%). During this period, around half of the states reduced the number of death by more than 20%, for instance: Alabama, Arizona, Arkansas, California, District of Columbia, Hawaii, Illinois, Iowa, Kansas, Louisiana, Maryland, Massachusetts, Mississippi, Nevada, New Jersey, New Mexico, New York, Oklahoma, Pennsylvania, Rhode Island, South Dakota, Tennessee, Vermont, Virginia, West Virginia, Wisconsin, Wyoming.

In the same time, some states have killed more people, for instance North Dakota and Texas.

=== Road safety states trends ===
US fatalities by state
View source data.
North Dakota: Source 1994–2006: North Dakota University; Source 2006–2015: North Dakota Department of transportation; Texas & California: Source; Texas Highway Safety Annual Report Fiscal Year 2015; Traffic Safety Facts: Fatalities of Vehicle Nonoccupants in Wheelchairs Struck by Motor Vehicles; Comparative Analysis of Fatal Crashes in Texas vs. California and Implications for Traffic Safety in Texas; Texas alternate count: Source Comparison of Motor Vehicle Traffic Deaths, Vehicle Miles, Death Rates, and Economic Loss 2003–2016; Source for 2015: Fatality Facts 2019: State by state

== NTSB most Wanted List are on roadway safety ==
NTSB chair considers a change is needed because

“The NHTSA projections for 2021 are devastating. We need to fundamentally change the way we approach traffic safety in the United States to save lives on our roadways (...) Overreliance on ineffective driver education and enforcement programs is a failure that has left gaps in the safety of our roadways. The results of these safety gaps is that more than 42,900 people were killed last year

The five NTSB’s Most Wanted List to prevent accidents, reduce injuries, and save lives are:

- Implement a Comprehensive Strategy to Eliminate Speeding-Related Crashes
- Protect Vulnerable Road Users through a Safe System Approach
- Prevent Alcohol- and Other Drug-Impaired Driving
- Require Collision-Avoidance and Connected-Vehicle Technologies on all Vehicles
- Eliminate Distracted Driving (Distracted driving)

== See also ==
- List of motorcycle deaths in U.S. by year
- Alcohol-related traffic crashes in the United States
- List of motor vehicle deaths in U.S. by year
- List of U.S. states by road deaths
- Road safety
- Air safety
- Risk analysis
- Rail Safety Improvement Act of 2008
- Work-related road safety in the United States
- Traffic code in the United States
