= Motorcycle fatality rate in U.S. by year =

U.S. Motorcycle Deaths 1975–2017
Year	Deaths	Injuries	Registered
1975	3,106		
1976	3,232		
1977	4,004		
1978	4,448		
1979	4,712		
1980	4,955		
1981	4,737		
1982	4,267		
1983	4,099		
1984	4,425		
1985	4,415		
1986	4,309		
1987	3,832		
1988	3,491		
1989	3,030		
1990	3,128		
1991	2,702		
1992	2,291		
1993	2,346		
1994	2,320 (IIHS 2,215)		
1995	2,227		
1996	2,161		
1997	2,116		3.8 million
1998	2,294	49,000	3.9 million
1999	2,483	50,000	4.2 million
2000	2,897	58,000	4.3 million
2001	3,197†	60,000	4.9 million
2002	3,244	65,000	5.0 million
2003	3,661‡	76,000	5.4 million
2004	4,028	76,000	5.8 million
2005	4,576	87,000	6.2 million
2006	4,837	88,000	6.7 million
2007	5,174	103,000	7.1 million
2008	5,312 (5,290)	96,000	
2009	4,462 (4,469)	90,000	
2010	4,502	82,000	
2011	4,612 (4,403)	81,000	
2012	4,695	93,000	
2013	4,402 4,688	88,000	
2014	4,295	92,000	
2015	4,976		
2016	5,286		
2017	5,172	89,000	
† some NHTSA lists show 3,181 ‡ some NHTSA lists show 3,714
Source NHTSA 2022:
2022	6,218		

This is a list of numbers of motorcycle deaths in U.S. by year from 1994 to 2014. United States motorcycle fatalities increased every year for 11 years after reaching a historic low of 2,116 fatalities in 1997, then increased to over 5,000 around 2008 and then plateaued in the 4 to 5 thousands range in the 2010s. In nine years motorcycle deaths more than doubled from the late 1990s to 2008. Despite providing less than 1% of miles driven, they made up 15% of traffic deaths in 2012.

Since about 2004 over 4,000 people have died every year up to 2014 in motorcycle accidents, and in 2007 and 2008 deaths exceeded 5,000 per year. At the same time occupant deaths of other types of vehicles have decreased in the 21st century, so motorcycle accident deaths have become an increased share of all deaths and noted for being 26 times more deadly than cars. Operators of sport motorcycle models had a higher rate of death compared to other motorcycle types, and speeding was noted in roughly half of fatal sport and super sport accidents compared to about a fifth for fatal accidents of other types. Sport and super sport riders were also likely to be younger among those involved in a fatal accident, with an average age of 27 (for the year 2005). The number of fatalities of those under 30 has gone from 80% percent in 1975 to 30% in 2014.

Nearly half of all deadly accidents involve only the motorcycle (so-called single-vehicle accidents) and a major issue is the loss of control during a bend in the road. Of the other over half of fatal accidents that do involve multiple vehicles, more than 75% involve head-on collisions, especially with vehicles that cross the lane of traffic but failed to spot the motorcycle.

== Annual rates ==
Between 1966 and 2008, the NHTSA estimated 148,000 people died in motorcycle accidents. In 2010, motorcycle accident fatalities accounted for 14% of all accident fatalities. It was also 14% in 2008. In 2008, 47% of fatal accidents were with another vehicle, and of those 77% involved a head-on collision with a motorcycle and in 7% the motorcycle was struck from behind. 59% of those killed were wearing a helmet, which were estimated to give a 37% increased chance of overall survival and reduction in the chance of a head injury; helmet use has been the subject of various studies and laws. In 2013, 6% of the fatalities were passengers (non-operator) of the total deaths that year for motorcycles 4,688.

A 2025 study analyzing FARS data (Fatality Analysis Reporting System) from 2020 to 2022 revealed an 11% increase in motorcycle fatalities across the U.S. During this period, Alaska, Hawaii, and Delaware experienced the largest increases, with fatalities rising by 100%, 84%, and 50%, respectively. In contrast, South Dakota, Wisconsin, and Kansas saw the most significant reductions, with fatal motorcycle crashes decreasing by 45%, 28%, and 24%, respectively.

== Ridership and demographics ==
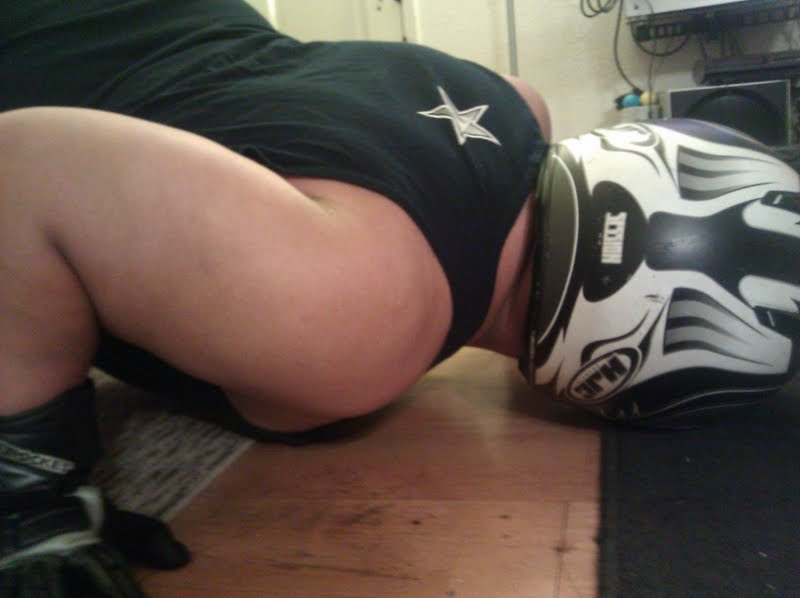
Simulation of ground contact showing danger to the brachial plexus nerves. However, damage to the lower spine due to that area's collision with the bike can leave a motorcyclist paralyzed.

From 1980 motorcycle ownership among riders aged 40 and over increased dramatically, from 15.1 percent of all riders in 1980 to 43.7 percent in 1998. The mean engine displacement of the motorcycles involved in fatal crashes also increased, from an average engine size of 769 cc (46.9 cu in) in 1990, to 959 cc (58.5 cu in) in 2001, an increase of 24.7 percent. It has been suggested that the combination of older riders on higher-powered motorcycles might have been partially responsible for the increase in motorcycle deaths from the late 1990s until 2004. Blunt abdominal trauma can be caused by a motorcycle accident, and can damage the testes and intestines.

Half of motorcycle fatalities in single-vehicle crashes relate to problems negotiating a curve prior to a crash—almost 60 percent of motorcyclist fatalities in single-vehicle crashes occur at night. However, even when riders survive, around 10% of trauma injuries include damage to the genital area, such as due to the collision of that area with a bike's gas tank.

In 2009, motorcycle fatalities in the US declined for the first time in 11 years but remained above 4000; that year's total dropped from 5,312 to 4,469 (between 2008 and 2009). Automobile fatalities continued to decline for the seventh straight year before 2011. A decline in recreational motorcycling due to the late-2000s recession might account for the decrease in accidents, according to the authors of a report by the Governors Highway Safety Association (GHSA), but a state motorcyclists' rights organization, the Motorcycle Riders Foundation, said motorcycle use appeared to have increased, influenced by motorcycles' better fuel economy. A preliminary report by the GHSA estimated that the number of motorcyclist deaths in 2012 was more than 5,000, a 9% increase over 2011.

In the USA during the 2010s, motorcycles comprised about 2% of registered vehicles (about 6 million bikes registered), but 14 percent of all fatal accidents. In addition, the rate of accidents per mile has gone up from the 1980s and was not due to increased ridership. One study evaluated motorcycles as being 37 times more dangerous for a fatal accident than a car.

Motorcycle accidents were the leading non-combat cause of death for US service members. Between 1999 and 2012 4,423 died in combined motor vehicle deaths including motorcycles. Of those 1,134 died in motorcycle crashes. Between 2001 and 2008, the portion of fatalities from motorcycles tripled, and by 2008 was almost 40% of overall vehicle fatalities. Motorcycle deaths have come under increased attention because other types of non-motorcycle fatalities have decreased, so motorcycle fatalities became an increased share of deaths. The fatalities echoed the national statistics with motorcycle fatalities of 4,927 deaths being 15 percent of all traffic deaths in 2012, even though motorcycles are three percent of vehicles. However, they account for a relatively smaller amount of the total miles traveled (motorcycles are often only driven in good weather) about 0.7% of all vehicles miles traveled 2012. (About half a million people to a million people would die each year if cars had a similar accident rate, all else being equal.)

93% of the crashes in 2012 involved a two-wheeled motorcycle. (see also Motorized tricycle)

Of 4,957 killed in 2012 on motorcycles, 7% were passengers. Combined driver and passenger deaths for motorcycles were 18% of all driver and passenger deaths in 2012 for all vehicles. This is for just 0.7% out of all vehicles miles driven in the US that year.

== Types of accidents and injuries ==
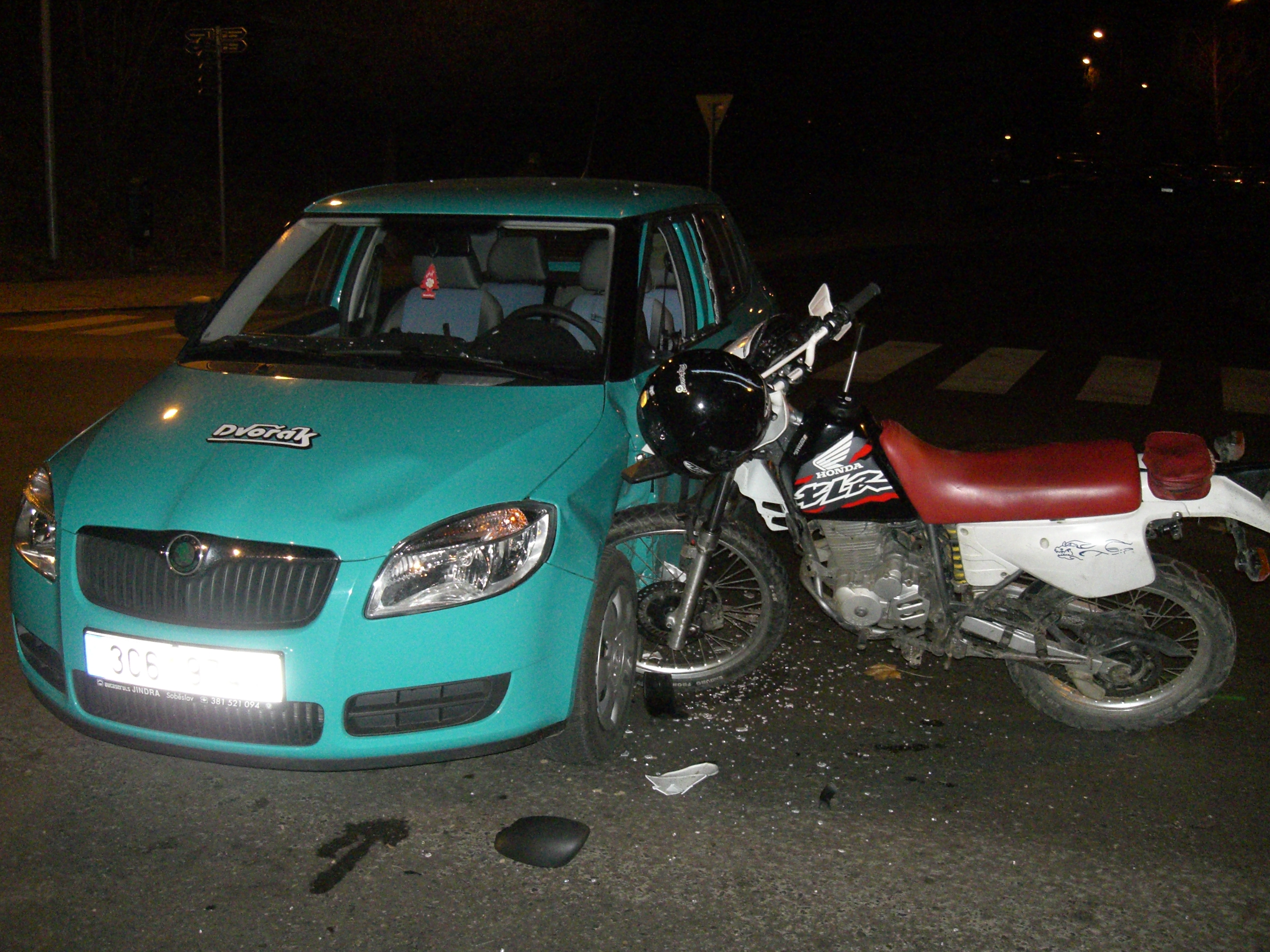
Motorcycle crash into a car

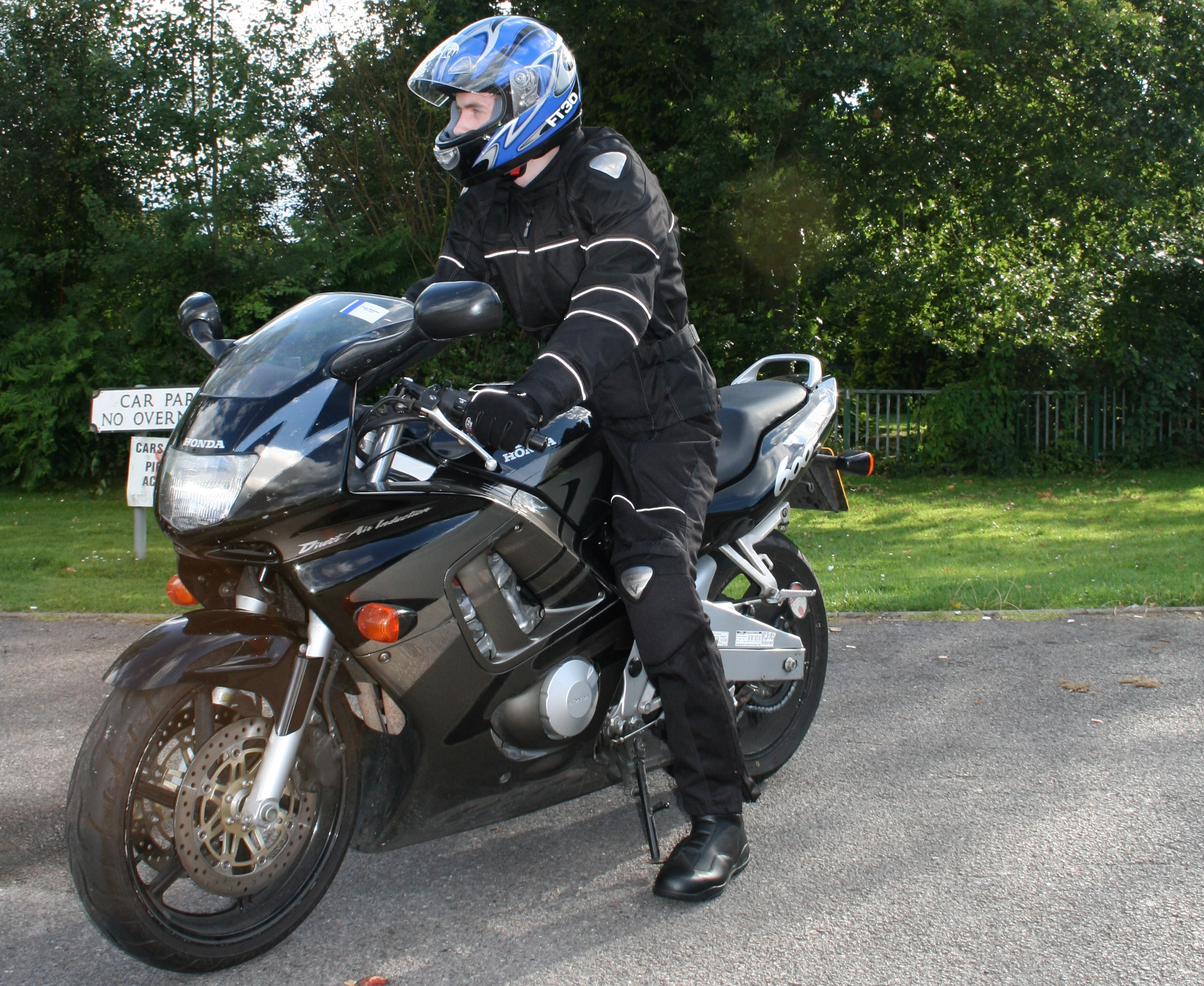
One problem, even in non-fatal accidents, is that the groin area can collide with the gas tank, damaging a rider's testicles.

By 2014 a rear-ending occurred every 17 seconds on the US road system, and improvements to cars especially in regards to headrests have reduced whiplash and other neck and back injuries related to this. One hope may be Collision avoidance systems on more vehicles.

However, it is head-on collisions with cars that make up one of the biggest types of fatal collisions. Of the 56% of fatal collisions with other vehicles, 78% percent were head-on collisions and 5% were a fatal rear-ending of the motorcycle by another vehicle type. Of those fatal head-on collisions one of the most common is when a car makes a turn and another situation is when a motorcycle is trying to pass another car.

In 2012, 75% of two-vehicle motorcycle accidents involved the motorcycle crashing into the vehicle ahead of it and only 7% involved the motorcycle being hit in the rear. That year half of all fatal accidents were two-vehicle crashes, However, they also had the highest rate of collision with fixed object between passenger cars, light trucks, and heavy trucks; with a 22% of fatalities being single-vehicle crashes with a fixed object. Of the two-vehicle crashes one nearly 40% involved the motorcycle hitting another vehicle turning left.

A quarter of motorcycle fatalities are single-vehicle crashes into a fixed object. Other dangers to motorcycles include enhanced risks compared to other vehicles include potholes, uneven pavement, and unexpected objects in the road such as animals.

One of the difficulties with motorcycles is achieving optimum braking between front and rear wheels during a panic stop without losing control of the vehicle. Enhanced operator training of how to achieve optimal braking of motorcycle may increase safety. Two technical features that may help are Linked brakes where front and rear brakes are braked with single control and anti-lock brakes.

Specific design elements of motorcycles that have been under scrutiny include the shape of the top gas tank or items placed on it which can contribute to urogenital or pelvic injuries in a crash. In cases of a single-rear brake-light, its failure leaves other drivers without notification that the motorcycle is stopping. Despite the focus on the head and helmet protection, it is possible for handlebars to castrate males in accident and damage done to the lower spine can leave men alive but paralyzed. Motorcycle accidents are risk factor for injuries to testicles, delicate reproductive organs that are contained in thin skinned sac outside the body in males. In collisions between testicles and gas tanks, testicle dislocation can occur where they are pushed into the lower abdomen. Motorcycle accidents can cause genitourinary trauma which may result in pelvic pain and various other symptoms depending on the nature of the damage.

Even moderate impacts in an accident may break the pelvis bone, which is one of the largest bones in the body and often bears the brunt of impacts with ground and objects during motorcycle crash or accident. A broken pelvis can lead to mobility problems due to the bone's central location.

Automotive and motorcycle accidents together are the leading cause of spinal cord injuries, about 35% percent.

Tire issues such as blow-outs can cause motorcycle accidents.

- Another vehicle fails to spot a motorcycle in an oncoming lane, and does a left turn and the motorcycle either has a head-on collision with car, or crashes during the evasive maneuver
- The motorcyclist exceeds the performance abilities of the bike and crashes.
- Road to bike interactions, such as large pothole triggers a loss of vehicle control
- Hits oncoming vehicles during a passing maneuver on a bi-directional road

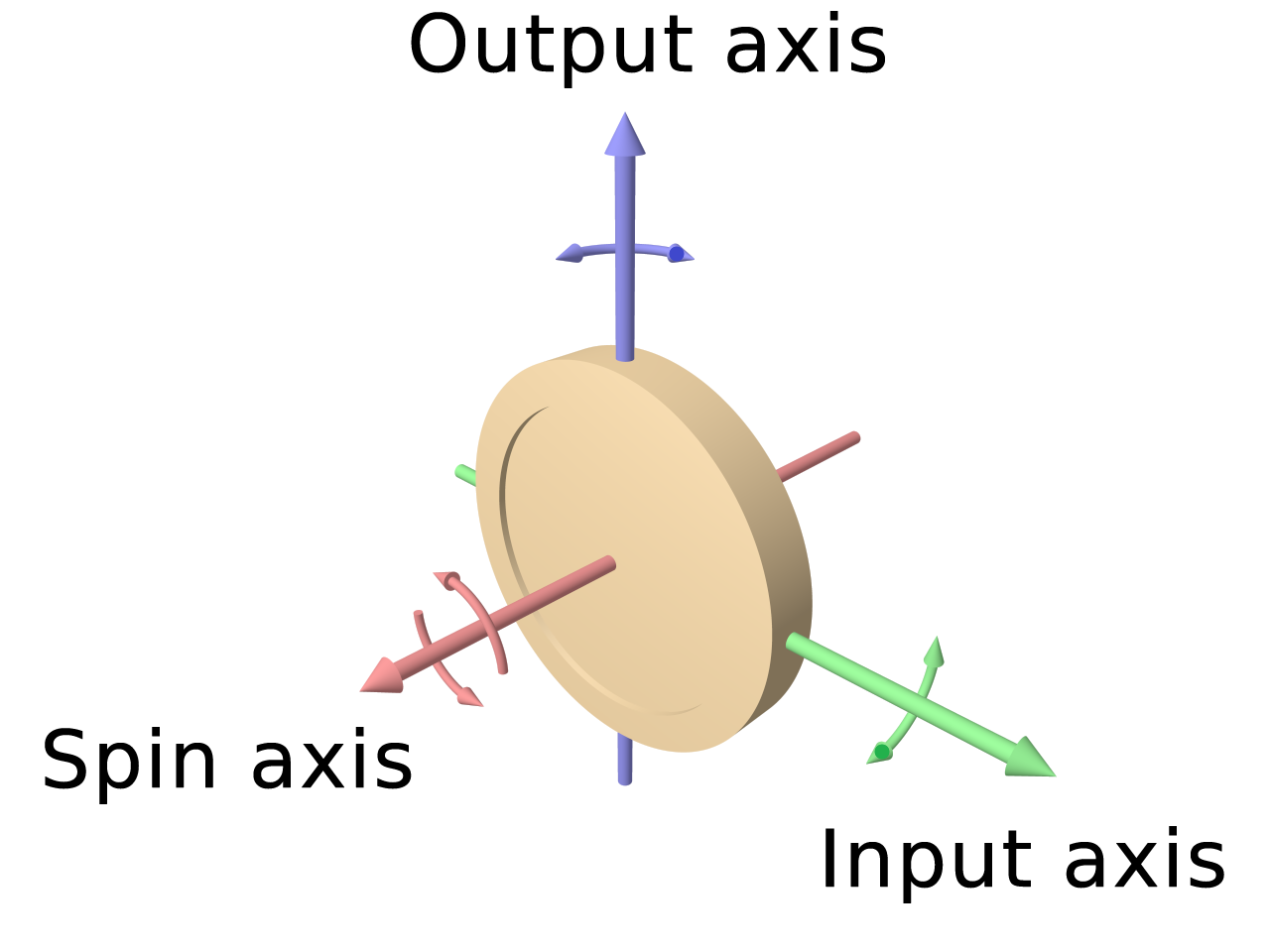
Gyroscopic effect on front wheel of a bike. Applying a torque (in green) about the lean axis results in a reaction torque (in blue) about the steer axis.

- Two specific types of accidents are the highsider and the lowsider. One effect riders may have to contend with is speed wobble.

== Serious non-fatal injuries ==
When an accident does happen, there is a reported 80% chance of injury or death on a motorcycle in comparison to about 20% for passenger vehicles.

Non-fatal injuries for motorcycle accidents include the danger of paralysis, such as quadriplegia. Automotive and motorcycle accidents together are the leading cause of spinal cord injuries, about 35% percent; this can include more minor injuries to the spinal cord up to more severe cases such paraplegic (2) or quad (4) plegic cases. Paralysis injuries can cost 300 thousand to US$1 million to treat in the first year, and one to 4 million over the person's lifetime. In some cases, people may survive their accident but have limbs amputated.

== Comparisons ==
In 2013, 4,735 pedestrians and 743 bicyclists were killed compared to 4,688 on motorcycles. (In the US, motorcycles includes both motorized tricycles and bicycles.) In 2013, a total of 32,479 were killed including motorcycle fatalities. Compared to passenger vehicles, motorcycles had 28 times the number of fatalities as cars per mile driven in 2016. 319 died on All terrain vehicles in 2013.

The breakdown in deaths by type of bike in 2013 is as follows: Cruiser 1,281, Touring 578, Sport-touring 22, Sport 269, Supersport 945, off-road 42, other or unknown 889. Breakdown for 2013 by engine size is 1,951 for under 1000 CC, 692 for 1000 to 1400, and 1,276 for over 1400 (approximately). 1,832 were single-vehicle crashes and 2,549 were multi-vehicle crashes.

327 died on ATVs in 2011 compared to 4,612–4,403 on motorcycles that year.

== Motorcycles in the US ==
In the US, the NHTSA defines the following vehicles as motorcycles: mopeds, two- or three-wheeled motorcycles, off-road motorcycles, scooters, mini bikes, and pocket bikes.

== Crash conditions ==
Source: FARS, ARS, "Unknown" removed for percentage computation.

== See also ==
- Motorcycle safety
- List of deaths by motorcycle accident
- Rider deaths in motorcycle racing
- Hurt Report 1981 safety research
- Lane splitting
- Bicycle and motorcycle dynamics
- Crumple zones
- Transportation safety in the United States
