= FeGiS =

Früherkennung von Gefahrenstellen im Straßenverkehr (American english: Early Detection of Dangerous Areas in road traffic), often shortened to FeGiS, is a road traffic safety research project for the early identification of danger points in road traffic and for the prevention of traffic accidents in Germany. The project was launched in December 2017 and was funded by the "mFund" of the Federal Ministry for Digital and Transport in two second funding stages, due to the successful completion of the FeGiS feasibility study in 2018.

== Background ==
The number of accidents and injuries caused by road fatalities in Germany had risen in the decade prior the project. The European Commission, in pursuit of "Vision Zero" (zero road fatalities), outlined the proactive identification of danger points in road traffic as one of its priorities in the EU Road Safety Policy Framework 2021–2030.

== Feasibility study ==
The feasibility study of the project was also sponsored by the "mFund" of the Federal Ministry for Digital and Transport. During this first funding stage, the crowdsourcing platform "gefahrenstellen.de" / "dangerspots.org" developed by the "Initiative for Safer Roads" in cooperation with the Institute for Road Engineering at RWTH Aachen University (ISAC), was successfully tested between 2017 and 2018. The focus was on the cities of Bonn and Aachen. Atotal of 1,500 danger reports with around 3,500 supporters were generated for the two cities over a period of approximately 6 months. A subsequent research analysis by RWTH Aachen University confirmed the high validity of the hazard reports. In addition to the identification of already-known accident black spots, road users also reported danger spots that had not yet become conspicuous due to accidents but showed a high risk potential during site inspections. Subsequently, it was decided to continue the project with an extended project approach.

== Development of FeGiS+ (EDDA+) ==
During the second funding stage between 2019 and 2022, the FeGiS concept was further developed for the studied model. The focus during this development phase was on analysing the correlation between the different data streams and on aggregating the information to extract "smart data" as a result.

The development plan of the research project also included a test of the applicability of the FeGiS+ approach in neighbouring European countries.

== FeGiS+/EDDA+ Hazard Score Map ==
As a result of the research project, the FeGiS+/EDDA+ Hazard Score Map for the entire German road network was published on gefahrenstellen.de in the summer of 2022. The hazard score map is also the basis for the digital school route planner. The application finds the 'safest possible' route to school using the open-route service of the Heidelberg Institute for Geoinformation Technology.

== Awards ==
In October 2022, the FeGiS+/EDDA+ Hazard Score Map received the Excellence in Road Safety Award in the Technology category and the Jacques Barrot Audience Award from the European Road Safety Charter, led by the European Commission.
