= JQA (disambiguation) =

John Quincy Adams was the sixth president of the United States from 1825 to 1829.

JQA may also refer to:

- JQA, the IATA code for Qaarsut Airport in Greenland
- Japan Quality Assurance Organization, a certification agency in Japan responsible for certifying ISO 39001 standards
- JQA, the NATO country code trigram for Johnston Atoll
- Japan Quidditch Association, a member of the International Quidditch Association
- JQA, a play about the president performed at the Arena Stage in Washington, D.C.
- JQA, a residence hall at the University of Massachusetts Amherst
- JQA, ICAO code for Trans-Jamaican Airlines
