= Road Safe America =

- Headquarters: PO Box 460278; Fort Lauderdale, Florida 33346-0278; United States
- Co-Founders: Steve and Susan Owings
- Website: http://www.roadsafeamerica.org/

Road Safe America is an American non-profit organization promoting road safety. It was founded by the parents of Cullum Owings, who died after his car was struck by a speeding truck on December 1, 2002.

Road Safe America has been a leading voice on requiring the use speed limiters on class 7 and 8 trucks (26,001-lbs and heavier). High-speed crashes involving class 7 and 8 trucks can be catastrophic, but they can also be avoided given that trucks of this size have been equipped with speed limiter technology for decades (built in since the 1990s). This technology is still not required to be used, despite nearly all of these trucks already having this capability. This allows some truck drivers to use speed as a competitive advantage against the many safe companies who voluntarily limit the maximum speed at which their fleet can operate.

Speeding has been recognized as a major safety issue for years. By speeding, a driver reduces their ability to stop safely in an emergency and increases their potential to cause serious harm if they are involved in a collision.

In order to prevent crashes involving trucks traveling at high speeds, motor carriers can set speed limiters on their trucks to a safe speed. Many leading trucking companies voluntary set the speed limiters on their trucks to reduce crashes and improve fuel efficiency.

These is also widespread public support for the required use of speed limiters in large trucks. A 2018 survey conducted by McLaughlin and Associates found that 79 percent of the likely voters supported Congress requiring large trucks to set their speed limiters to 65 mph. Only 13 percent opposed it.

A New York Times article, dated November 27, 2005, discusses Steve and Susan Owings' attempts to have speed governors mandated for use on large trucks. All trucks manufactured since 1992 have the governors installed as standard equipment and it is the argument of Road Safe America that these governors should be set at 65 miles per hour (105 km/h) for all trucks. Road Safe America has been joined by the American Trucking Associations, insurance companies and numerous national carriers in petitioning the Department of Transportation for a regulation mandating the use of these speed limiters.
