= Level of service (transportation) =

Qualitative measure of motor vehicle traffic service

Level of service (LOS) is a qualitative measure used to relate the quality of motor vehicle traffic service. LOS is used to analyze roadways and intersections by categorizing traffic flow and assigning traffic quality levels based on performance measures such as vehicle speed, density, and congestion.

== United States ==
The level of service was first introduced in the 1965 edition of the Highway Capacity Manual (HCM) using the roadway's size and context (urban vs. rural), and current or future conditions related to travel time, speed, delay, maneuverability, and user comfort. The American Association of State Highway and Transportation Officials' (AASHTO's) Geometric Design of Highways and Streets (or the "Green Book"), provides guidance to transportation engineers and planners on highway and street geometric design. The Green Book uses the LOS method defined in the HCM to characterize transportation system performance. The system's performance is assigned an academic letter grade, with A representing free flow and F representing breakdown flow.

Level of service	General operating conditions
A	Free flow, with low volumes and high speeds
B	Reasonably free flow, but speeds beginning to be restricted by traffic conditions.
C	Stable flow, but most drivers are restricted in the freedom to select their own speeds.
D	Approaching unstable flow; drivers have little freedom to select their own speeds.
E	Unstable flow; may be short stoppages.
F	Forced or breakdown flow; unacceptable congestion; stop-and-go.

=== Multimodal LOS ===
The primary basis for the multimodal procedures is from NCHRP Report 616: Multimodal Level of Service Analysis for Urban Streets. This research developed and calibrated a method to evaluate the multimodal LOS (MMLOS) of different urban street designs and operations. This method is designed to evaluate complete streets, context-sensitive design alternatives, and smart growth from the perspective of all street users. It is used to evaluate the trade-offs among various street designs in terms of their effects on the perceptions of autodrivers, transit passengers, bicyclists, and pedestrians regarding the quality of service provided by the street. This was incorporated into the 2010 edition of the Highway Capacity Manual (HCM 2010). The HCM 2010 incorporates tools for multimodal analysis of urban streets, encouraging users to consider the needs of all travelers. Stand-alone chapters for the bicycle, pedestrian, and transit have been eliminated, and methods applicable to them have been incorporated into the analyses of the various roadway facilities.

=== Intersection LOS ===
The HCM defines LOS for signalized and unsignalized intersections as a function of the average vehicle control delay. LOS may be calculated per movement or per approach for any intersection configuration, but the LOS for the intersection as a whole is defined only for signalized and all-way stop configurations.

LOS	Signalized Intersection	Unsignalized Intersection
A	≤10 sec	≤10 sec
B	10–20 sec	10–15 sec
C	20–35 sec	15–25 sec
D	35–55 sec	25–35 sec
E	55–80 sec	35–50 sec
F	>80 sec	>50 sec

When analyzing unsignalized intersections that are not all-way stop-controlled, each possible movement is considered individually. Each movement has a rank. Rank 1 movements have priority over rank 2 movements, and so on. The rank of each movement is as follows, with the major road being the road whose through movement moves freely, the minor road being controlled by stop signs. As for vehicular movements that conflict with pedestrian movements of the same rank, pedestrians have priority:

- through movements on the major road, parallel pedestrian movements, and right turns from the major road. LOS for movements of this rank is trivial, because LOS is determined by control delay. These are "free" movements, and the control delay is always zero.
- includes left turns from the major road.
- includes through movements on the minor road, parallel pedestrian movements, and right turns from the minor road.
- includes left turns from the minor road.

Movements are analyzed in order of rank, and any capacity that is left over from one rank devolves onto the next rank. Because of this pecking order, depending on intersection volumes, there may be no capacity for lower-ranked movements.

==== Modern roundabouts ====
The 2000 HCM provides skeleton coverage of modern roundabouts, but does not define LOS: the measure of effectiveness is the quotient of the volume to the capacity. A modern roundabout in the United States is one in which traffic within the circle always has priority. Entering traffic is controlled by a yield sign.

=== Other LOS applications ===
The performance of other transportation network elements can also be communicated through LOS. Among them are:

- Two-lane roadways (uninterrupted flow)
- Multilane roadways (4 or more lanes) (uninterrupted flow)
- Open freeway segments
- Freeway entrances (merges), exits (diverges), and weaving lanes
- Bicycle facilities (measure of effectiveness: events per hour; events include meeting an oncoming bicyclist or overtaking a bicyclist traveling in the same direction)
- Pedestrian facilities (HCM measure of effectiveness: pedestrians per unit area)

== United Kingdom and Northern Ireland ==
The LOS measure is much more suited to American roads than roads in Europe and the UK, but the HCM is used. The technique is in UK textbooks but is sparingly used. The individual countries of the UK have different bodies for each area's roads, and detailed techniques and applications vary in Scotland, England and Wales, but in general the practice is the same.

Rural and urban roads are in general much busier than in the U.S., and service levels tend to be to the higher end of the scale, especially in peak commuting periods. It is acceptable for roads to operate at 85% capacity, which equates to LOS D and E.

In general, the principle is to take the volume of traffic in one hour and divide by the appropriate capacity of the road type to get a v/c rating, which can be cross-referenced to the textbooks with tables of v/c ratings and their equivalent LOS ratings. The lack of definitive categories towards LOS D, E and F limit the use, like a D or E category on an urban road, would be acceptable.

In certain circumstances, the UK shortens the LOS categories to just A-D. A and B indicate free-movement of traffic (i.e. under 85% capacity), C reaching capacity 85%-100%, D over capacity. Little reference to this can be found in textbooks and it may just be an 'unwritten engineering practice', agreed with certain authorities.

== Australia ==
In Australia LOS are an integral component of Asset Management Plans, defined as the service quality for a given activity. LOS are often documented as a commitment to carry out a given action or actions within a specified time frame in response to an event or asset condition data.

Refer Austroads Guide to Traffic Management Part 3 for a comprehensive explanation.
