= Highway Capacity Manual =

United States federal highway manual

- Authors: Transportation Research Board
- Published: January 2022
- Publication date: 1950; 76 years ago
- Publication place: United States
- ISBN: 030908766X
- LC Class: HE336.H48 H54

The Highway Capacity Manual (HCM) is a publication of the Transportation Research Board (TRB) of the National Academies of Sciences, Engineering, and Medicine in the United States. It contains concepts, guidelines, and computational procedures for computing the capacity and quality of service of various highway facilities, including freeways, highways, arterial roads, roundabouts, signalized and unsignalized intersections, interchanges, rural highways, and the effects of mass transit, pedestrians, and bicycles on the performance of these systems.

There have been seven editions with improved and updated procedures from 1950 to 2022, and major updates to the HCM 1985 edition in 1994, 1997, and 2015. The HCM has been a worldwide reference for transportation and traffic engineering scholars and practitioners, and also the base of several country-specific capacity manuals. The most recent version, the Highway Capacity Manual, Seventh Edition: A Guide for Multimodal Mobility Analysis, was released in January 2022. The latest edition incorporates the latest research on highway capacity, quality of service, active traffic and demand management, and travel time reliability.

== History ==
There are more than seven decades of research behind the HCM. The first edition of the Highway Capacity Manual was released in 1950 and contained 147 pages, divided into eight parts. It was the result of a collaborative effort between the Transportation Research Board (TRB) and the Bureau of Public Roads, the predecessor to the Federal Highway Administration.

The following editions were published by TRB in 1965, 1985, 2000, 2010, 2016, and 2022. Every edition of the HCM involves input and feedback from multiple agencies, including the American Association of State Highway and Transportation Officials (AASHTO), the Federal Highway Administration, and TRB. In 2013, TRB contracted the development of a major update to the 2010 Highway Capacity Manual. The final version, published as the Highway Capacity Manual, Sixth Edition: A Guide for Multimodal Mobility Analysis, or HCM 2016, or HCM6, was released in October 2016. The sixth edition incorporates the latest research on highway capacity, quality of service, active traffic and demand management, and travel time reliability.

== See also ==
- Highway Safety Manual
- Traffic congestion
- National Safety Council
