= Arterial road =

High-capacity urban road

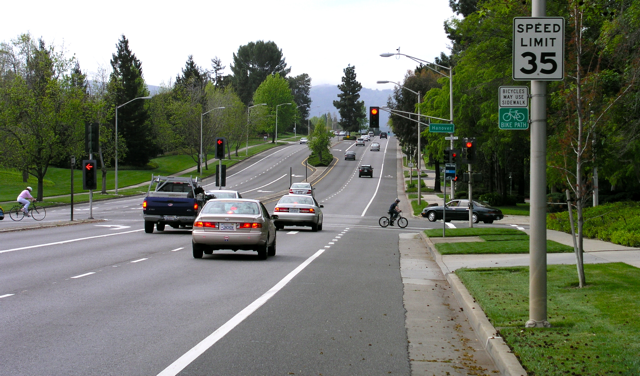
Page Mill Road in Palo Alto, California, United States, is a typical arterial road in a suburban area; this also has an unprotected bike lane on the road shoulder

An arterial road or arterial thoroughfare is a high-capacity urban road that sits below highways on the road hierarchy in terms of traffic flow and speed. The primary function of an arterial road is to deliver traffic from collector roads to highways or expressways, and between urban hubs at a relatively high level of service. Therefore, many arteries are limited-access roads or feature restrictions on private access. Because of their relatively high accessibility, many major roads face large amounts of land use and urban development, making them significant urban places.

In traffic engineering hierarchy, an arterial road delivers traffic between collector roads and highways. For new arterial roads, intersections are often reduced to increase traffic flow. In California, arterial roads are usually spaced every half mile, and have intersecting collector(s) and streets.

== Definition ==
The Traffic Engineering Handbook describes "Arterials" as being either principal or minor. Both classes serve to carry longer-distance flows between important centers of activity. The handbook also states that arterials are laid out as the backbone of a traffic network and should be designed to afford the highest level of service, as is practical.

== Development ==
The construction and development of arterial roads is achieved through two methods. By far the most common is the upgrading of an existing right-of-way during subdivision development. When existing structures prohibit the widening of an existing road however, bypasses are often constructed. Because of the placement and general continuity of arterial road corridors, sewers, water mains, conduits and other infrastructure are placed beneath or beside the roadbed.

== Specifications ==
In North America, signalized at-grade intersections are used to connect arterials to collector roads and other local roads (except where the intersecting road is a minor side street, in which case a stop sign is used instead). In Europe, large roundabouts are more commonly seen at the busier junctions. Speed limits are typically between 30 and 50 mph (50 and 80 km/h), depending on the density of use of the surrounding development. In school zones, speeds may be further reduced; likewise, in sparsely developed or rural areas, speeds may be increased. In western Canada, where highways are scarce compared to the rest of North America, flashing early-warning amber lights are sometimes placed ahead of traffic lights on heavy signalized arterial roads so the speed limits can be raised to speeds of over 80 km/h. These warning lights are commonly found on high-speed arterial roads in British Columbia.

The width of arterial roads ranges from four lanes to ten or more.

== Environmental issues ==
As with other roadway environmental consequences derive from arterial roadways, including air pollution generation, noise pollution and surface runoff of water pollutants. Air pollution generation from arterials can be rather concentrated, since traffic volumes can be relatively high, and traffic operating speeds are often low to moderate. Sound levels can also be considerable due to moderately high traffic volumes characteristic of arterials, and also due to considerable braking and acceleration that often occur on arterials that are heavily signalized.

== See also ==
- Grid plan
- History of urban planning
- Stroad
