= Killed or seriously injured =

Scoring system

Killed or seriously injured (KSI) is a standard metric for safety policy, particularly in transportation and road safety.

== History ==
ISO 39001 considers a serious injury as one having an impact on the body or on the capacity of an individual.

== Definition ==
=== United Kingdom definitions ===
- Killed: The usual international definition, as adopted by the Vienna Convention in 1968 is 'A human casualty who dies within 30 days after the collision due to injuries received in the crash'.
- Serious injury: The definition is less clear-cut and may vary more over time and in different places. The UK definition covers injury resulting in a person being detained in hospital as an in-patient, in addition all injuries causing: fractures, concussion, internal injuries, crushings, burns (excluding friction burns), severe cuts, severe general shock which require medical treatment even if this does not result in a stay in hospital as an in-patient.
- Slight injury: Sprain (including neck whiplash injury), bruising or cuts which are not judged to be severe. Also slight shock requiring roadside assistance.

=== United States definitions ===
The definitions used in the USA are as follows:

- Fatal injury. To be used where death occurs within thirty consecutive 24-hour time periods from the time of the crash.
- Incapacitating injury. Any injury, other than a fatal injury, which prevents the injured person from walking, driving or normally continuing the activities the person was capable of performing before the injury occurred. This includes: severe lacerations, broken or distorted limbs, skull or chest injuries, abdominal injuries, unconsciousness at or when taken from the crash scene, and unable to leave the crash scene without assistance. Does not include momentary unconsciousness.
- Non-incapacitating evident injury. Any injury, other than a fatal injury or an incapacitating injury, which is evident to observers at the scene of the crash in which the injury occurred. This includes: lump on head, abrasions, bruises and minor lacerations. This does not include limping unless any actual injury can be seen.

=== European Union ===
- Killed: The usual international definition, as adopted by the Vienna Convention in 1968 is 'a human casualty who dies within 30 days after the collision due to injuries received in the crash'.
- Serious injury: In 2015, the European Union defined a concept of serious injures in order to share the same definition across the whole European Union. This new concept is based on MAIS (from the English Maximum Abbreviated Injury Scale). Based on this standard, serious injuries are defined as scale 3 and more (or MAIS3+).

In 2014, 135,000 people were seriously injured on Europe's roads.

== Issues ==
Figures for fatalities are normally highly reliable in industrialised countries, and few if any fatalities go unrecorded. Fatality figures are, however, often too low, making it hard to see trends over time for one place.

Figures for the number of people seriously injured typically are an order of magnitude larger than the number of people killed, and are therefore more likely to be statistically significant. However, classification of serious injuries is open to opinion, by medical staff or by non-medical professionals, such as police officers, and may therefore vary over time and between places.

Figures for slight injuries are considered highly unreliable, largely due to under-reporting where injuries are self-treated.

== Derived metrics ==
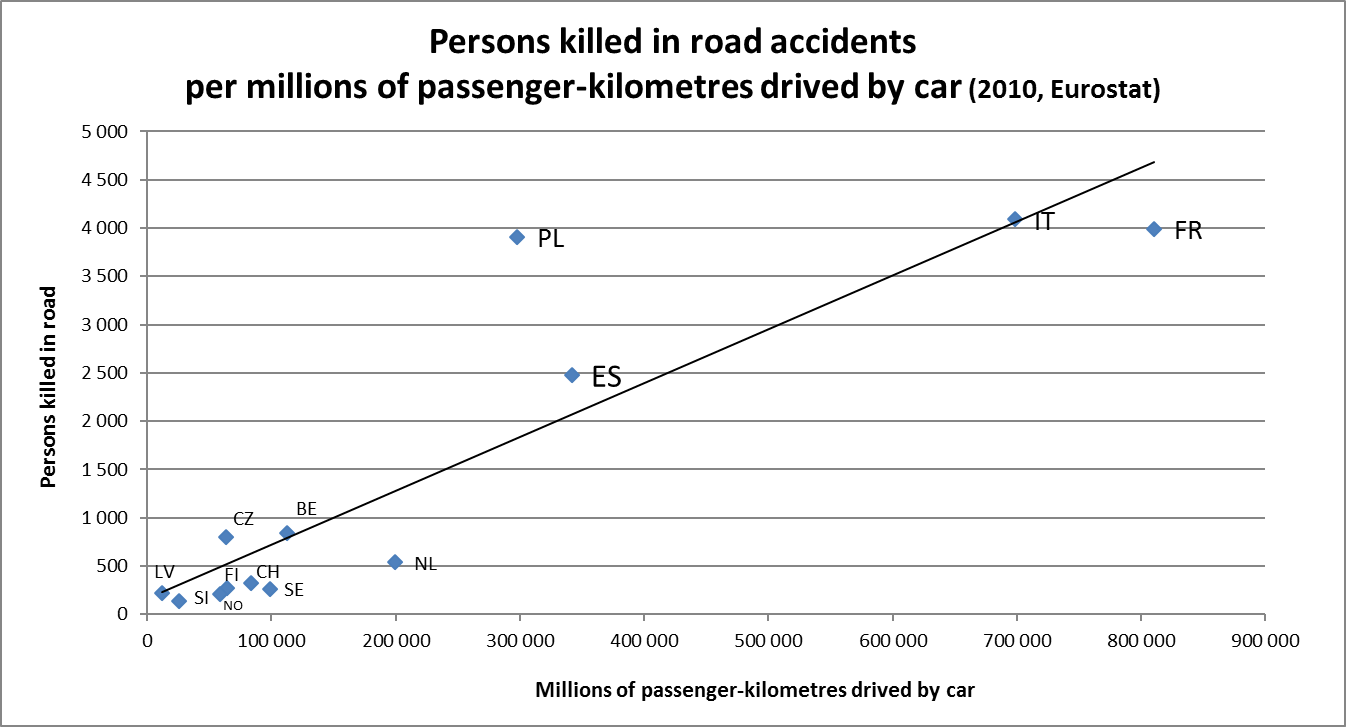
According to Eurostat, there is almost a linear proportion between the total number of passenger-km driven by car and road fatalities.

Several metrics are derived from KSI metrics, with various goals such as international comparisons which need normalization.

Fatalities per capita	This metric allows comparison of countries, whatever the size of their population. It is used by OECD and in Europe. It allows comparison of countries similar in their development. It can be considered as a health risk. It can be computed on regional / local level.
Fatalities per vehicle-kilometres	This indicator is related to assessment of the travel-risk on a given road network. Only 22 IRTAD countries produce such a metric. It allows comparison with other transportation modes or comparison of road networks.
Fatalities per registered vehicles	This indicator is more easily available than fatalities per vehicle-kilometres, so it might help to compare nations, taking into account both their size and their level of development.

The 28 EU-28 countries, for the 28 members, computed an indicator named "per 10 billion pkm". Pkm is an indicator of traffic volume which is used for not having consistent vehicle-kilometre data. Are counted cars and estimated motorised two-wheelers. In 2016, this indicator ranged from 23 for Sweden to 192 for Romania, with a value of 52 for the EU-28. In Germany, France, the UK and Italy, this score is respectively 33, 46, 28, and 44.

== See also ==
- Epidemiology of motor vehicle collisions
- Reported Road Casualties Great Britain
