= Highway Safety Manual =

Publication predicting highway safety

The Highway Safety Manual (HSM) is a publication of the American Association of State Highway Transportation Officials. It contains concepts, guidelines, and computational procedures for predicting the safety performance of various highway facilities.

The HSM was published in 2010 and is divided into four sections:

- Part A – Introduction, Human Factors, and Fundamentals of Safety;
- Part B – Roadway Safety Management Process;
- Part C – Predictive Methods; and
- Part D – Crash Modification Factors.

== See also ==
- Highway Capacity Manual – United States federal highway manual
- Transportation Research Board – Group based in Washington, United States
- American Association of State Highway and Transportation Officials – Transportation association
