= Speeding. No one thinks big of you. =

Advertising campaign in New South Wales, Australia

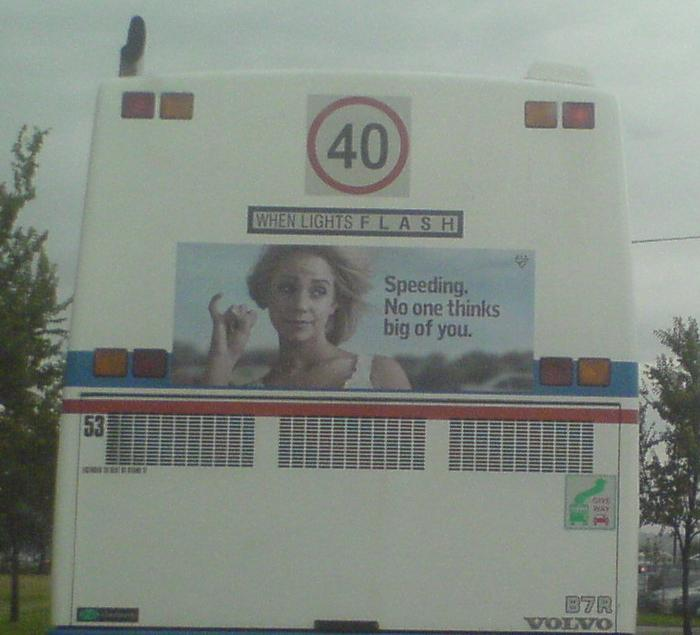
- Advertising from the campaign on the back of a bus in 2008
- Client: Roads & Traffic Authority
- Release date: June 2007
- Country: Australia

Speeding. No one thinks big of you. is an Australian multimedia advertising campaign launched in June 2007 by the Roads & Traffic Authority in New South Wales. The campaign cost $1,900,000 Australian dollars. It was intended to discourage speeding for young drivers ranging from 17 to 25 years old.

It used hand gesture of wiggling the pinkie finger towards the speeding drivers, a gesture representing a small penis. It implies they are speeding because they have a small penis, with the message that they are compensating for it by driving fast.

In 2006 there were 500 road fatalities, 40% of which were speeding-related and 94 deaths were of young drivers on a provisional license. John Whelan, director of the Roads & Traffic Authority stated "P-platers represent only seven percent of license holders yet are dramatically over-represented in our road toll, so we need to do everything we can to get the message through to them." Whelan also stated that the typical "shock and horror" ads with images of injuries and crashes were not effective among young people, who played video games and watched horror movies.

The campaign included a 45-second video with people wiggling their pinkies at irresponsible drivers used in cinema and television advertisements, an image of a woman wiggling her pinkie used for billboards and posters at bus stops, and a 15-second Internet advertisement advertising an "xtra xtra small" condom to speeders.

== Television ad ==
The advert starts with a male driver in a yellow Ford Falcon XR6 sedan rolling to a red traffic light and stopping, and glancing over at two women standing on the footpath. When the light turns green he starts a burnout as he is driving forward. After he passes them, the women do the pinkie gesture to each other. The second clip shows a woman beginning to cross a street when a male driver in a red Toyota Celica (A90) liftback speeds past her, an elderly woman sitting on a bench from across the street reacts with the pinkie gesture. The third clip shows a blue Holden Commodore (VL) sedan with a P-plate on the rear, with a male driver and two male passengers in the back seats. The car drifts through a corner and oversteers before the driver corrects it, one of the passengers reacts by giving the pinkie gesture to the other, the male driver sees them doing the gesture through the rearview mirror, and stops smiling.

== Aftermath ==
The Advertising Standards Bureau received 34 complaints for the ads. The ad campaign drew some criticism, with some calling it sexist. Top Gear Australia created a television ad in 2008 for their magazine parodying the campaign.

According to a government-commissioned survey, around 60% of young men thought of their driving habits after the ad. In 2008 deaths of males related to speeding fell 20%, and by 2011 were close to 30% lower. The ad campaign was downloaded over 500,000 times from the Roads & Traffic Authority website, and also MySpace and YouTube, websites popular amongst young people.
