= ISO 39001 =

Traffic safety standard

ISO 39001:2012 Road traffic safety (RTS) management systems - Requirements with guidance for use is an ISO standard for a management system (similar to ISO 9000) for road traffic safety. The implementation of the standard is intended to enable organizations to improve their traffic safety and to reduce the number of persons killed or seriously injured.

Development of the standard began in February 2008 and the first edition was published on October 1, 2012. It is under the responsibility of the ISO Technical Committee "ISO/TC 241".

== Scope and background ==
This Standard is applicable to public and private organizations that interact with the road traffic system.

This International Standard is applicable to any organization that wishes to:

- establish, implement, maintain and improve an RTS management system
- assure itself of conformity with its stated RTS policy
- demonstrate conformity with this International Standard

The organization must have a process, that

- observes/evaluates the accident numbers, numbers of killed and injured persons ...
- provides a continuous improvement of the traffic safety
- observes and evaluates events, that are in connection with the road traffic safety

== Performance factors ==
In section 6 "planning" there is a list of "performance factors" that covers among other things, the following:

a) Risk exposure factors

- Traffic volume and traffic mileage by vehicle and road user type
- Volume of product and/or service provided by the organization

b) Final safety outcome factors

- The number of deaths and serious injuries

c) Intermediate safety outcome factors

- The safe planning, design, operation and use of the road network

- Road design and safe speed especially considering separation (on-coming traffic and vulnerable road users such as pedestrians, cyclists, and horse riders), side areas and intersection design
- Use of appropriate roads depending on vehicle type, user, type of cargo and equipment
- Use of personal safety equipment especially considering seat belts, child restraints, bicycle helmets, motorcycle helmets, and the means to see and be seen
- Using safe driving speed also considering vehicle type, traffic and weather conditions
- Fitness of drivers especially considering fatigue, distraction, alcohol and drugs
- Safe journey planning including consideration of the need to travel, the amount and mode of travel and choice of route, vehicle and driver

- The safe entry and exit of vehicles and road users to the road network

- Safe vehicles especially considering the occupant protection, protection of other road users (vulnerable as well as other vehicle occupants), road traffic crash avoidance and mitigation, road worthiness, vehicle load capacity and securing of loads in and on the vehicle.
- Appropriate authorization to drive/ride the class of vehicles being driven/ridden
- Removal of unfit vehicles and drivers/riders from the road network

- The recovery and rehabilitation of road traffic crash victims from the road network

- Post crash response and first aid, emergency preparedness and post crash recovery and rehabilitation.

== Contents ==
The ISO 39001 will consist of following sections:

1. Introduction
2. Scope
3. Normative References
4. Terms and Definitions
5. Context of the organisation
6. Leadership
7. Planning
8. Support
9. Operation
10. Performance Evaluation
11. Improvement
12. Annex (informative): Guidance on the use of this International Standard

== Certification ==
A number of ISO 39001 certification has increased since 2012. For example,

- More than 60 companies got certified to ISO 39001 by JQA in Japan.
- In Korea, Korea Postal Logistics Agency (POLA) got certified to ISO 39001 by KFQ for the first time.
- ISO reports that 41 organizations affiliated to the Swedish Association of Road Transport Companies had been certified to ISO 39001 by August 2013 – a figure expected to rise to 100 by 2014.
- Spain: first public transport company to be certified to ISO 39001
- South Africa: 72 transport fleets representing some 4 600 trucks and buses certified to the RTMS standard will also adopt ISO 39001.
