= Work-related road safety in the United States =

A video on wearing seatbelts when driving for work-related purposes

People who are driving as part of their work duties are an important road user category, in terms of road safety in the United States.

Firstly, workers themselves face increased risk of road traffic injury. Motor vehicle crashes are the leading cause of work-related deaths in the U.S. Death, disability, or injury of a family wage earner due to road traffic injury, in addition to causing emotional pain and suffering, creates economic hardship for the injured worker and family members that may persist well beyond the event itself.

Additionally, many workers drive larger and heavier vehicles or multi-passenger vehicles. This creates a greater risk of a larger number of more serious injuries in an accident. Many U.S. workers must undergo specialized training in order to drive professionally, including bus drivers.

Contributing factors include fatigue and long work hours, delivery pressures, distractions from mobile phones and other devices, lack of training to operate the assigned vehicle, vehicle defects, use of prescription and non-prescription medications, medical conditions, and poor journey planning.

Employers are in a unique position to address these issues. They can use the employer-employee relationship as leverage to complement and enforce government policies that require safety belt use, prohibit impaired driving, improve training practices, and prohibit mobile-phone use and other forms of distracted driving. Safe-driving policies implemented in the workplace can promote safer driving away from work. In addition, employers, as purchasers of large fleets of vehicles, can spur improvements in vehicle safety, and encourage development of road safety capacity and legislation, thereby improving road safety for all.

Research examining motor vehicle crashes has focused on topics such as driver fatigue, medical conditions, distracted driving, biomechanics, vehicle engineering, collision warning systems, stability control, naturalistic driving data and the potential relation these factors have on the crashes. Various interventions from researchers studying driver behaviors have focused on vehicle monitoring devices, seat belt controls, enhanced training using immersive simulation, behavioral interventions, and obeying safe driving practices.

== Crash data and data sources ==
Motor vehicle crashes (MVCs) are consistently the leading cause of work-related fatalities in the U.S. A total of 8,173 workers died in work-related MVCs on public highways from 2003 to 2008, representing 24% of all work-related fatalities for the period. The annual average fatality rate was 0.9 deaths per 100,000 workers. Workers employed in the trucking industry accounted for the greatest number (2,320) and highest rate of highway transportation deaths (19.6 per 100,000 workers). Other U.S. industries with high fatality rates due to work-related MVCs were logging (11.7 per 100,000 workers), wholesale distribution of petroleum products (8.6), waste management (8.5), support activities for mining (7.9), and taxi and limousine services (6.8). The majority of work-related MVC fatalities occurred among occupants of trucks (67% of deaths), especially tractor-trailers (34% of deaths). Nearly half of all fatalities were collisions between two or more vehicles (49%), and 19% were non-collision incidents, especially jack-knifed trucks and overturned vehicles. These statistics include only drivers and passengers in motor vehicles; U.S. data do include MVCs occurring off public highways, as well as fatalities of pedestrian workers, but these are not presented here. However, U.S. data on work-related fatalities do not include motor vehicle crashes while commuting to or from work, nor do crash data systems for the general population identify commuting status.

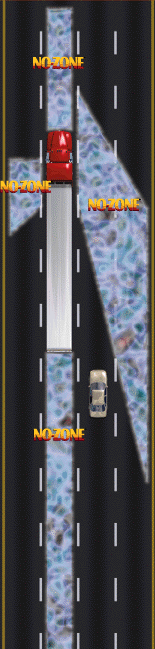
The No-Zone represents the danger areas, or blind spots, around trucks and buses where crashes are more likely to occur.

The source of the data discussed above is the Census of Fatal Occupational Injuries (CFOI), a program managed by the Bureau of Labor Statistics (BLS) with data provided by state agencies. CFOI is the most comprehensive surveillance system for work-related injury fatalities in the U.S. Multiple data sources are accessed to compile data, including death certificates, OSHA reports, workers’ compensation reports, police reports, and media accounts. Cases are deemed to be work-related upon confirmation by two independent data sources. CFOI combines strong methods for case ascertainment with detailed information on worker demographics and company characteristics. However, because CFOI must capture information on all kinds of occupational fatalities, it provides little detail on circumstances and risk factors specific to MVCs. A national surveillance system based on police crash reports provides more detailed information on circumstances and contributing factors for fatal MVCs. The National Highway Traffic Safety Administration's (NHTSA) Fatality Analysis Reporting System (FARS) collects comprehensive data on the crash, the vehicle, the driver and other persons involved. However, FARS identifies work-related fatalities only through the death certificate, which often does not fully ascertain work-related fatalities. Nor does FARS categorize fatally injured workers by industry or occupation.

U.S. data on nonfatal work-related crashes are limited. Through a sample survey of employers, the Survey of Occupational Injuries and Illnesses (SOII), BLS generates annual estimates of nonfatal occupational injuries by variables such as industry, source of injury (e.g., a motor vehicle), body part(s) injured, age, and median lost work days. SOII provides little incident-level detail that can help to guide MVC prevention initiatives. Further, because SOII does not cover certain worker groups such as agricultural workers on farms with fewer than 11 employees and the self-employed, it undoubtedly underestimates the number of work-related MVCs and other events.

== The operating environment for work-related road safety ==
Workplace driving in the U.S. takes place in two distinct settings: the U.S. Department of Transportation (DOT) regulatory regime that covers large trucks and buses, and the unregulated operation of lighter-weight fleet or personal vehicles driven for work purposes. Regulations to promote safe operation of large trucks and buses have been part of U.S. Federal policy since the 1930s. Most recently, the Motor Carrier Safety Improvement Act of 1999 assigned this regulatory responsibility to the Federal Motor Carrier Safety Administration (FMCSA) in the U.S. Department of Transportation. Most of the large body of research on occupational road safety in the U.S. has focused on identifying and mitigating road risk for operators of large trucks and buses through behavioral, engineering, and management interventions.

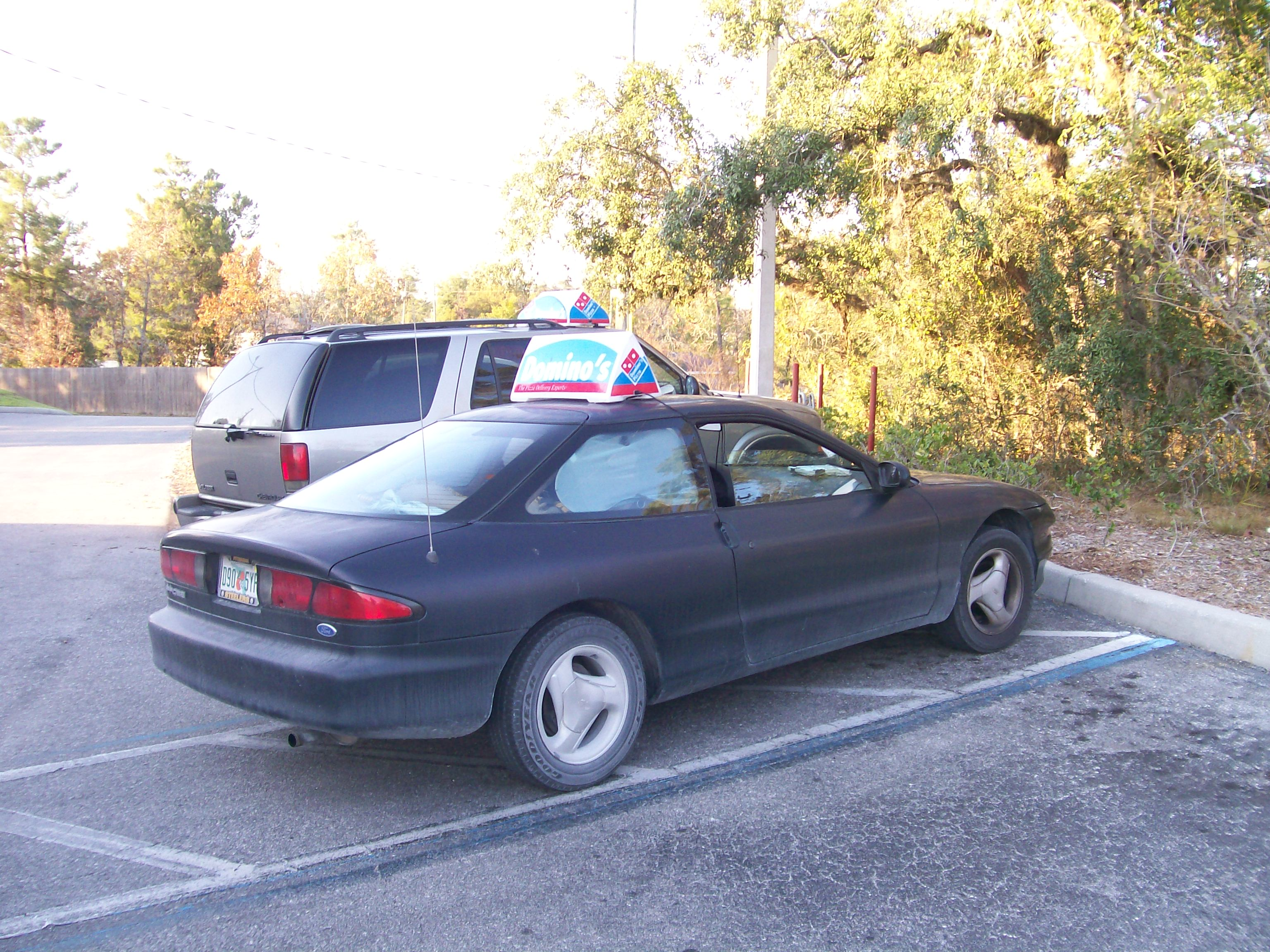
Light vehicles used for work, such as these pizza delivery cars, are not regulated by the U.S. Department of Transportation.

In contrast, there is no corresponding body of regulations applicable to U.S. workers who operate motor vehicles other than large trucks or buses as part of their job duties: i.e., those who operate lighter vehicles that are employer-owned or leased, or those who drive personal vehicles for work purposes. It is true that at-work drivers are covered by the Occupational Safety and Health Administration (OSHA) “general duty clause”, which requires that an employer provide “employment and a place of employment which are free from recognized hazards that are causing or are likely to cause death or serious physical harm to his employees”.

Further, OSHA has issued regulations covering limited aspects of mobile equipment operation in construction, logging, marine terminals, and agriculture. However, OSHA has not put in place regulations for operation of motor vehicles on public roadways that would cover a wide range of vehicles, drivers, and work situations. In general, the OSHA policy response to occupational risks of light vehicle operation has been carried out through voluntary initiatives, guidance documents and ad hoc advisory committees.

Operation of lighter vehicles in the U.S. workplace is in effect governed by traffic laws, augmented by employer policies. In the U.S., laws related to mobile-phone use, safety belts, speed limits, age of licensure, and license renewal are the responsibility of individual states. Inconsistency from state to state can complicate road-safety management for organizations that operate in multiple states. Many employers, recognizing the substantial economic and human toll of MVCs on their organizations and their workers, have implemented organizational policies for road safety that exceed the requirements of traffic laws.

In response to safety advocacy, public opinion, and increasing threats of costly litigation, U.S. employers are moving to ban text messaging or use of mobile phones while driving on organizational business. The U.S. DOT, the Network of Employers for Traffic Safety (NETS), and the National Safety Council (NSC) offer a variety of resources to assist organizations in formulating and implementing policies on text messaging and mobile phone use: sample policies, reviews of liability issues, results of company surveys on mobile phone policies, and guidance on policy implementation and enforcement. FMCSA has recently issued rules banning both text-messaging and the use of handheld mobile phones by operators of commercial motor vehicles (large trucks and buses).

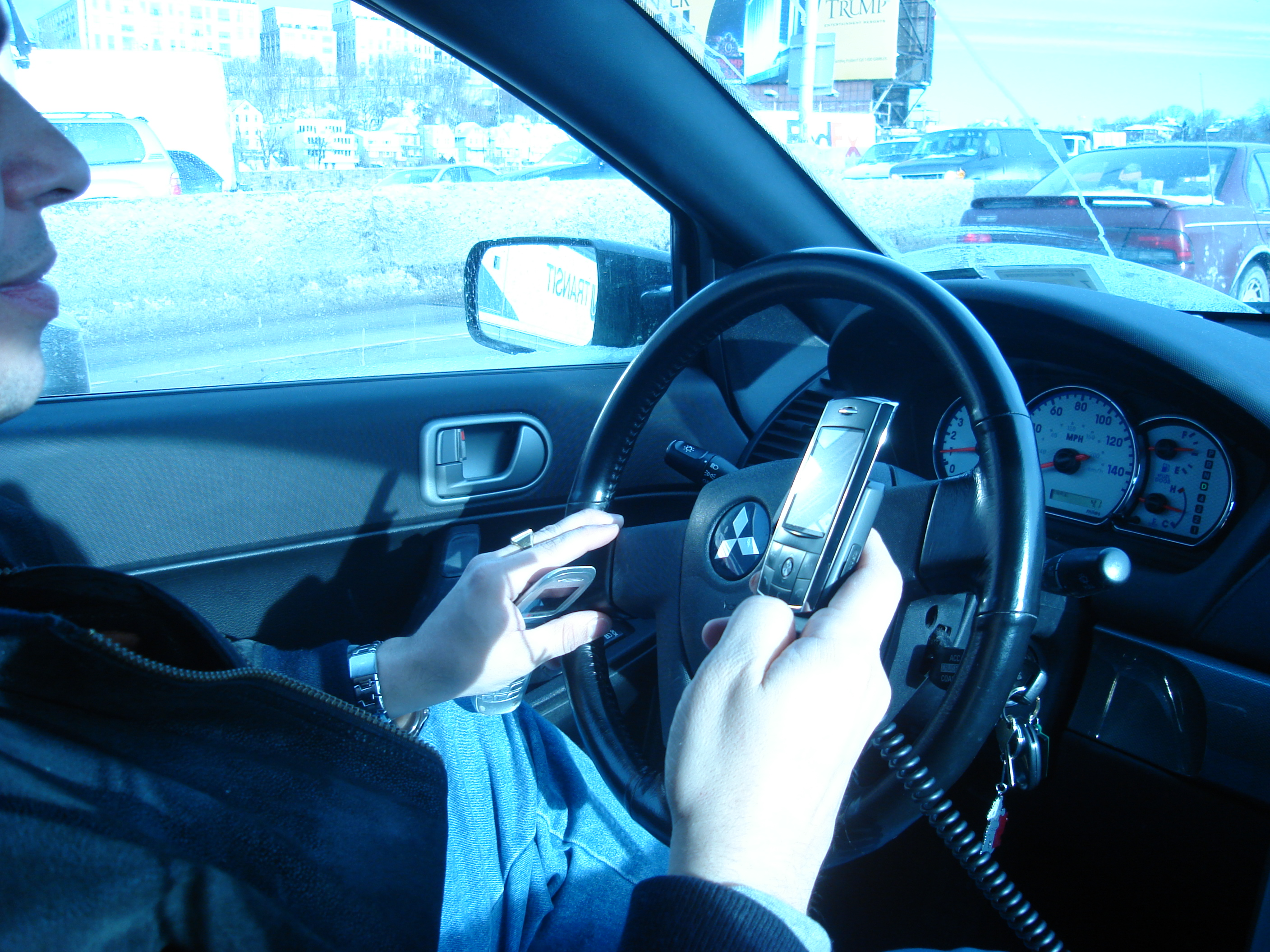
Distracted driving has become a chief concern in road safety, given the advent of mobile phone usage.

The American Trucking Associations has published a comprehensive textbook on risk factors, proximal causes, and prevention of large/heavy truck crashes. Topics include the size and nature of the truck collision problem; safety research methods; driver, vehicle, and roadway risk factors; vehicle-based technologies; safety management and operations; regulations, enforcement, and compliance; and “active safety.” “Active safety” encompasses the many fleet-based safety practices that are beyond legal compliance requirements but which can dramatically enhance safety performance. The book emphasizes implementation of these practices within individual fleets, but they could also be disseminated through government-industry collaborations and alternative compliance approaches.

In addition, OSHA recently implemented its first broad-based enforcement initiative related to motor vehicle safety on the topic of distracted driving. At the 2010 Distracted Driving Summit, former Secretary of Labor Hilda Solís announced that OSHA would focus on preventing distracted driving through education and partnerships, complemented by a new enforcement initiative. In her remarks, the Secretary stated: “When OSHA receives a credible complaint that an employer requires texting while driving or who organizes work so that texting is a practical necessity, we will investigate and where necessary issue citations and penalties to end this practice.”

== Research and surveillance studies ==
Based on the premise that targeted interventions are the most effective means of preventing occupational fatalities, researchers in the United States have published a number of studies aimed at documenting risk factors for occupational MVCs in various occupations and industries. Because fatality risk is consistently highest in the truck transportation sector, the vast majority of U.S. literature on occupational road safety addresses known and hypothesized risk factors for truck drivers, including driver fatigue and hours of service, medical conditions, and use of mobile devices.

In the U.S., a great deal of this research has been accomplished through partnerships between government agencies and government-supported research institutes housed at universities. Because U.S. regulation of occupational road safety is largely limited to the safety of large trucks and buses, these institutes have focused on providing the evidence base to support changes to the FMCSA safety regulations that cover these larger vehicles. Two research institutes that conduct much of the research on heavy-vehicle safety are the University of Michigan Transportation Research Institute (UMTRI) and the Virginia Tech Transportation Institute (VTTI).

UMTRI houses the Center for National Truck and Bus Statistics. For many years, it has worked collaboratively with FMCSA and NHTSA to maintain the Trucks Involved in Fatal Accidents (TIFA) and Buses Involved in Fatal Accidents (BIFA) databases. Starting with cases identified in the Fatality Analysis Reporting System (FARS) (the U.S. national database of road traffic fatalities based on police crash reports), UMTRI researchers collect detailed data on vehicle configuration, cargo type, hours of driving, and other variables. In addition, TIFA and BIFA data collection protocols are easily adapted to address emerging issues. Other strengths of the UMTRI program include vehicle engineering, crash avoidance systems such as collision warning systems and stability control, biomechanics, and risk factors such as distraction, fatigue, and medical conditions.

With support and collaboration from U.S. DOT agencies, VTTI has developed strong expertise in the collection of analysis of naturalistic driving data, i.e., video and other data collected from instrumented vehicles operated by drivers over an extended period under normal driving conditions. VTTI has collected naturalistic driving data for passenger vehicles and for large trucks. Its research has influenced recent changes in FMCSA regulations that prohibit operators of large trucks and buses from engaging in text-messaging and using handheld mobile phones while driving.

Other VTTI research based on naturalistic driving data has demonstrated that not all commercial vehicle drivers have an equal likelihood of experiencing “safety-critical events,” i.e., crashes, near-crashes, or high-risk events such as lane deviations. One example is that drivers classified as obese were significantly more likely to be rated as fatigued, to be involved in a safety-critical event, and to be involved in safety-critical events related to fatigue. Another naturalistic driving study of local and short-haul truck drivers found that 8 of the 42 drivers in the study accounted for 60% of the 77 safety-critical events documented. In progress at VTTI is a case-control study that seeks to differentiate commercial drivers who are involved in a crash from those who are not according to individual and organizational characteristics. This line of research has implications to improve trucking safety by identifying attributes of higher-risk individuals and implementing controls to monitor and improve their safety performance. It can also identify high-risk organizational attributes amenable to changes in safety management practices.

Other U.S. studies have used injury and fatality to describe crash risk factors in worker groups perceived to be at high risk. Reports published in the last decade have addressed MVCs among law enforcement officers, home healthcare workers, workers operating agricultural equipment on public roadways, and workers in the mining sector.

=== Intervention evaluations ===
Researchers in the United States have undertaken field evaluations of in-vehicle devices that monitor driver behaviours and fuel consumption. Studies that tested the use of in-vehicle monitoring in emergency medical services (EMS) reported substantial improvements in driver behaviour through in-vehicle monitoring systems that gave drivers real-time feedback. The researchers reported that the technology demonstrated sustained cost savings in regards to vehicle maintenance and required minimal retraining of drivers. Another study of EMS drivers reported similar results and recommended gradual implementation of in-vehicle monitoring, with attention to defusing potential concerns regarding a punitive approach to corrective action.

Another intervention study, conducted among U.S. and Canadian drivers, evaluated a device that prevents drivers from shifting vehicles into gear for up to 8 seconds unless safety belts are buckled. Participants were 101 commercial drivers who operated vans, pickups, and other light trucks. The driver could escape or avoid the delay by fastening his or her safety belt before shifting out of park. Unbelted participants experienced either a constant delay of 8 seconds, or a variable delay of 8 seconds on average. A 16-second delay was introduced for those U.S. drivers who did not show significant improvement. Safety belt use increased from 48% to 67% for U.S. drivers and from 54% to 74% for Canadian drivers. After the driver fastened his or her safety belt, it tended to remain fastened for the duration of the trip.

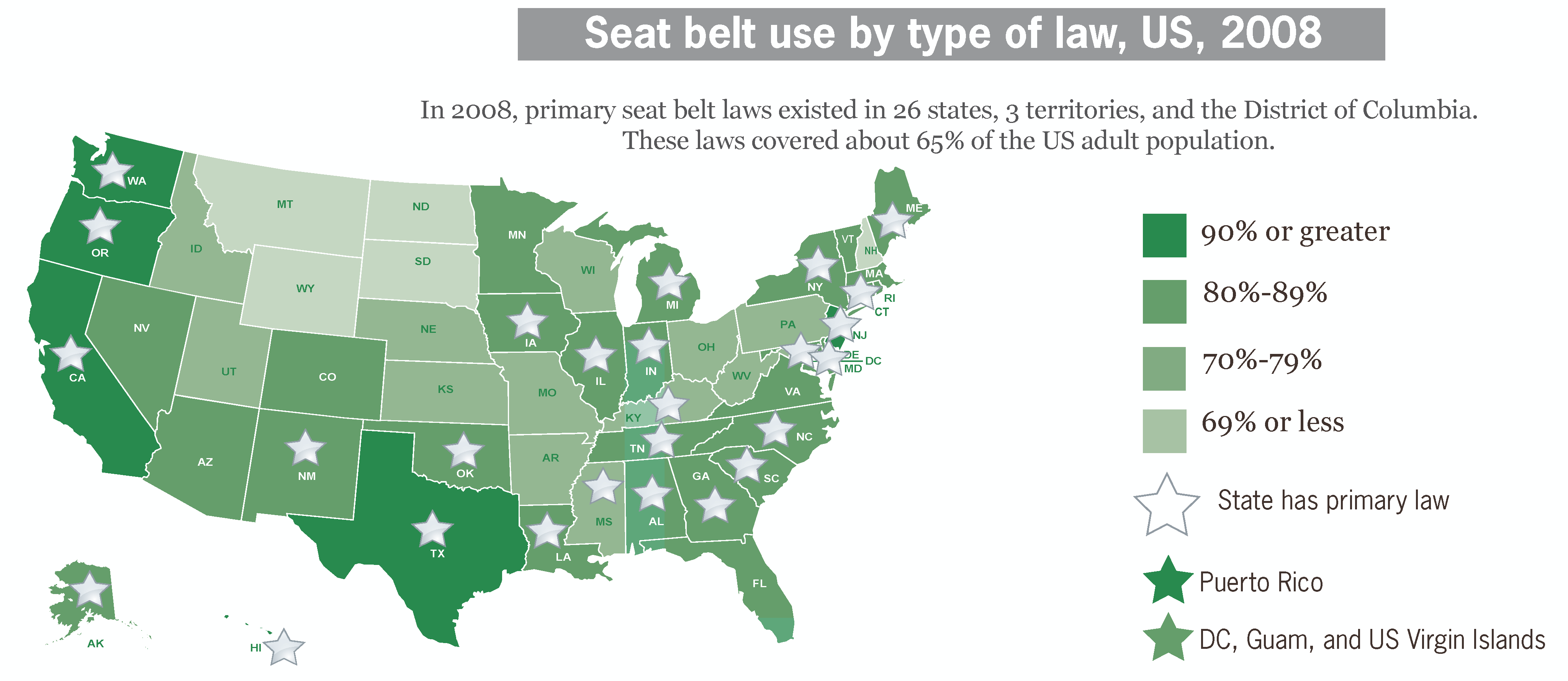
Seat belt use by type of law in 2008.

Few U.S. studies have assessed the effectiveness of initiatives intended to change occupational drivers’ behaviours through management interventions. One exception is a series of related experimental studies conducted over many years by Ludwig and Geller among pizza delivery drivers. In the United States, these workers tend to be college-age and thus relatively inexperienced drivers. Drawing from principles of organizational and community psychology, Ludwig and Geller proposed that interventions should be applied in a multiple-level hierarchical fashion, beginning with low-cost, low-intensity interventions targeted at all drivers and proceeding to higher-intensity and more intrusive interventions for those who resisted initial interventions. They also hypothesized that an intervention's effectiveness depends on four variables:

- Involvement: The higher the level of employee involvement, the greater the likelihood that social norms within the work group will change.
- Peer support: Greater opportunities for interactions between workers will lead to individuals prompting one another to adopt the desired safety behaviour.
- Response information: Salient and timely feedback increases the likelihood that the worker will respond to the feedback.
- External consequences: Stronger consequences, whether they come in the form of rewards for compliance or penalties for non-compliance, will be associated with stronger responses to the intervention.

The studies conducted by Ludwig, Geller, and colleagues focused on inducing drivers to use safety belts and turn signals and to come to a complete stop at intersections. The interventions assessed in this research included awareness-raising, safety pledges, individual and group goal-setting (with goals assigned by managers or developed by workers), directives from management, and individual and group competitions for rewards. In general, the researchers found that high-involvement interventions were effective in changing the targeted behaviour, and that in some cases these also seemed to be associated with positive changes in other safe driving behaviours. In addition, individualized public feedback was more effective than generic feedback, and worked well for those who were initially non-compliant with low-level, non-intrusive interventions. When external consequences were discontinued, compliance was not sustained. The researchers recommended that organizations begin with low-intensity, low-cost interventions such as group meetings, signage, or other media, progressing to more intrusive interventions for those who fail to respond to low-level interventions. They also noted that those who comply initially can be enlisted as agents of change who can influence co-workers, family, and friends to drive safely.

== Governmental initiatives ==
=== Federal Motor Carrier Safety Administration ===
The mission of the Federal Motor Carrier Safety Administration (FMCSA) is to ensure the safe operation of large trucks and buses, primarily by creating and enforcing safety regulations. FMCSA also supports research and non-regulatory safety initiatives related to new technology, management practices, and driver behavior. Examples of regulatory and non-regulatory FMCSA initiatives:

- Federal Motor Carrier Safety Regulations: This body of regulations cover all aspects of large truck and bus operations in the United States: the commercial driver's license (CDL) program, oversight of companies that transport freight or passengers, transport of hazardous materials, conditions under which a vehicle or a driver may be disqualified, drug and alcohol testing, hours of service of drivers, use of mobile phones, vehicle markings, securing of cargo, and many others. This was expanded in 2022 with a universal baseline set of minimum training requirements for entry-level commercial motor vehicle (CMV) drivers.
- FMCSA Medical Program: This initiative aims to ensure that the physical qualifications of drivers reflect current clinical knowledge and practice. The program includes a National Register of Certified Medical Examiners to ensure quality, consistency, and accountability for the medical examination required to obtain a CDL.
- Statistics: FMCSA maintains cross-border safety, inspection, and collision statistics, organized by their country of domicile, for registered intrastate and interstate motor carriers operating in the United States.
- Training guidance: In 2025 FMCSA approved the use of simulators in CDL training (provided they are not used as the sole training platform or to demonstrate proficiency for the purposes of ELDT qualification).
- CMV Driver Health & Safety Resources: A collection of defensive driving tips focusing on common driving errors made by commercial vehicle drivers.
- "Share the Road Safely": This program aims to improve the knowledge of all highway users to minimize the likelihood of a collision with a large/heavy truck and reduce the consequence of those that do occur.
- " Commercial Motor Vehicle Safety Belt Program ": An initiative to increase use of safety belts among drivers of large trucks and buses through outreach, education, and research. Safety belt use increased from an estimated 48% in 2002 to 78% in 2010, and is moving toward belt-use levels for the general motoring population.
- "Safety is Good Business": Provides resources to help motor carriers better understand their business responsibilities under the regulations, as well as the economic benefits of safety, and offers tools to help companies improve their safety performance initiatives.

=== National Highway Traffic Safety Administration ===
The National Highway Traffic Safety Administration (NHTSA) is a road safety agency in the U.S. DOT with a wide range of responsibilities for vehicle safety and driver safety. Although NHTSA does not have special responsibilities related to occupational road safety, a number of its activities are relevant to occupational road safety. In the realm of vehicle safety, NHTSA promulgates the Federal Motor Vehicle Safety Standards, which apply to all motor vehicles manufactured for sale or use in the United States. It also conducts crash tests of motor vehicles and publishes safety ratings for all makes and models based on these tests. These NHTSA manufacturing standards and crash tests are directly relevant to occupational road safety, as they influence the safety of vehicles available to U.S. organizations and provide information to guide selection of fleet vehicles. NHTSA has produced models and guidance on the economic burden of traffic crashes on employers. Because public and private employers in the U.S. generally subsidize at least a portion of health insurance premium costs for employees and their dependents, employers bear some of the costs of crashes involving employees and families away from work in addition to at-work crashes. Employers are also liable for damages awarded in the courts for crashes for which employees are found to be at fault. In 1998–2000, motor vehicle crash injuries occurring on and off the job were estimated to cost employers nearly US$60 billion annually. On average, a fatality occurring on the job cost a business over US$500,000 in direct and liability costs, and each nonfatal injury cost nearly $74,000 USDs. For on- and off-the-job crashes combined, the study estimated the cost of non-use of safety belts at more than $6 billion each year, and the cost of alcohol-related crashes at more than $9 billion each year.

NHTSA has also used occupational fleet vehicles to pilot-test a new application of a technology-based intervention to increase safety-belt use. In this small pilot test, drivers who were unbelted experienced sustained haptic feedback to the gas pedal when they exceeded 25 miles per hour (mph). Although drivers could continue to drive unbelted and exceed 25 mph by pressing on the pedal harder, they needed to exert constant mental and physical effort to do so. Alternatively, they could buckle their safety belts to make the feedback disappear. The intervention was uniformly successful in inducing all drivers in the test to buckle their safety belts, showing the promise of this and similar interventions to improve the safety of vehicle fleets.

=== National Institute for Occupational Safety and Health ===
The National Institute for Occupational Safety and Health (NIOSH) is the U.S. Federal agency responsible for conducting research and making recommendations for prevention of all kinds of occupational injuries and illnesses. Over the past 10 to 15 years, NIOSH has devoted considerable effort to building its capacity for research and prevention activities related to occupational road safety. This has been accomplished through analysis and interpretation of injury and fatality data development of injury prevention resources, and research to advance prevention of MVCs and resulting injuries in high-risk populations. NIOSH seeks to effect change through a variety of mechanisms: communication of research results through the peer-reviewed literature and industry channels, safety information targeted to employers and workers, changes in government regulations, and development of voluntary consensus standards.

In partnership with other Federal agencies and private-sector and non-governmental partners, NIOSH is engaged in a comprehensive program of research and prevention activities for preventing MVCs among emergency responders, including fire fighters and emergency medical services (EMS) workers. These activities encompass a program for investigations of fire fighter line-of-duty fatalities due to MVCs, which lead to comprehensive case reports that are disseminated throughout the fire service nationwide. NIOSH has also produced guidance documents on topics such as tanker-truck rollovers, safety at railroad crossings, and safety of pedestrian workers at incident sites.

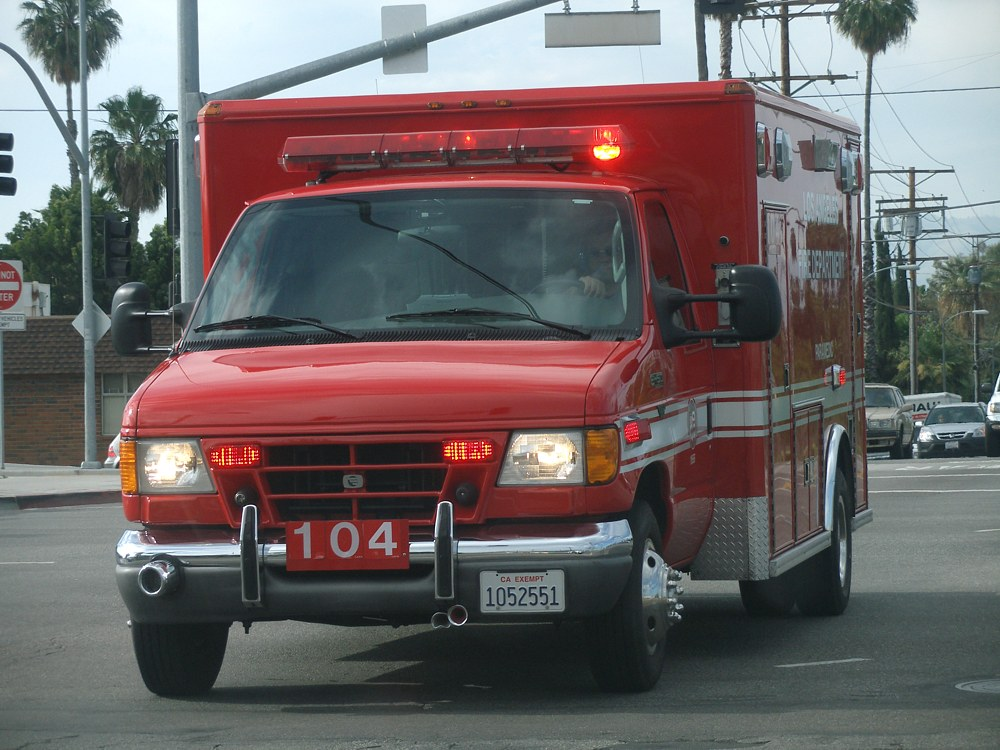
The risk of ambulance crashes affects workers in the cab and patient compartment, patients, and members of the public.

In addition, NIOSH researchers are pursuing a line of research related to ambulance safety. In the U.S., an ambulance may be one of a number of vehicle body types, and there are no comprehensive safety standards that specify requirements for safety and crashworthiness. Of special concern is the safety of workers in the ambulance patient compartment, where work tasks are not compatible with the use of occupant restraints and where equipment and interior layout put workers at high risk of injury in the event of a crash. Sled and crash tests of ambulances conducted by NIOSH and partners show that retrofitting patient compartments with redesigned occupant restraints will allow EMS workers the level of mobility needed to care for patients and at the same time afford greater protection from injury than standard lap belts. NIOSH work in this area has led to development of new voluntary standards for crash-testing of ambulances. The research program has now expanded to address the full range of human-factors concerns about worker safety in ambulance patient compartment, with a number of other manufacturing standards and testing standards in progress.

NIOSH has also conducted research on the health and safety of truck drivers. Taking advantage of existing expertise in anthropometry – the measurement of body dimensions for the purpose of designing safer and more ergonomically efficient work environments – NIOSH researchers conducted a nationally representative field survey of truck drivers using advanced digital body scanning and more traditional manual measurements of body dimensions. NIOSH researchers also assessed the driver's interface with the vehicle, measuring distances between the driver's hands and feet and vehicle control systems. Results from the anthropometric study and the in-cab measurements have been transferred to vehicle manufacturers, who will use them to design the next generation of truck cabs to better accommodate today's population of truck drivers. The safety implications of these design changes are many – improved visibility for drivers, better control of the vehicle, improved safety-belt design, and reduced risk of chronic conditions such as low back pain.

NIOSH is also engaged in global initiatives for occupational road safety as part of its mission to provide global leadership in occupational safety and health. NIOSH, with its partner agency the National Center for Injury Prevention and Control, represents the Centers for Disease Control and Prevention (CDC) in the United Nations (UN) Road Safety Collaboration, and provides input to UN resolutions and reports on road safety. NIOSH also provides technical assistance and exchanges information with international partners such as the European Agency for Safety and Health at Work (EU-OSHA) and the European Transport Safety Council, and with government agencies and non-governmental organizations in the United Kingdom, France, Sweden, Australia, Mexico, India, and other locations.

=== National Transportation Safety Board ===
The National Transportation Safety Board (NTSB) is an independent U.S. government agency charged with determining probable causes of transportation incidents in all modes of transportation through in-depth, on-scene investigations. Comprehensive reports of these investigations are available to the public. Based on its investigations, NTSB makes safety recommendations directed to those groups best-positioned to bring about change, in most cases the Federal government, states, or manufacturers. In recent years, NTSB has produced a number of motor vehicle crash reports with relevance to work-related road safety, including crashes of motorcoaches, large trucks, and 15-passenger vans.

=== Presidential Executive Orders ===
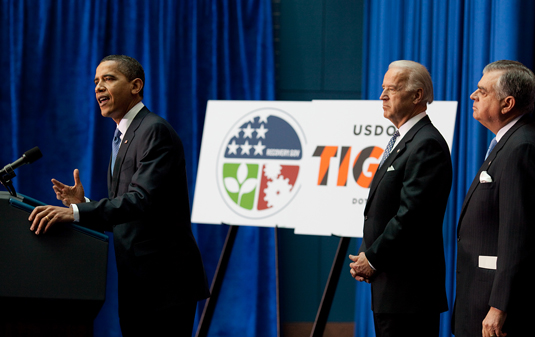
President Barack Obama speaking at the Department of Transportation, shown with Vice President Joe Biden and US Secretary of Transportation Ray LaHood.

U.S. Presidents have mandated certain road safety rules for the nearly 3 million civilian Federal employees in advance of these requirements being incorporated into basic road safety law. For example, in 1997, President Bill Clinton issued an Executive Order requiring all Federal employees to wear safety belts while on official business, and encouraging government contractors to follow suit. As of this writing, one U.S. state, New Hampshire, had no law requiring vehicle occupants to use safety belts, and several other states did not allow law enforcement officers to issue a citation for non-use of safety belts unless the motorist had committed a more serious infraction.

In 2009, President Barack Obama issued an Executive Order prohibiting Federal employees from text-messaging while driving a government-provided vehicle, while driving a personal vehicle on official Government business, and at any time when using Government-supplied electronic equipment while driving. More than 30 states now prohibit text-messaging while driving.

=== Occupational Safety and Health Administration ===
As noted above, the Occupational Safety and Health Administration (OSHA) has recently implemented a new enforcement directive around prohibition of text-messaging while driving. Although OSHA has few other regulations that address vehicle safety, it has built alliances with public and private groups to promote occupational road safety. One example is the “Every Belt–Every Ride” initiative to encourage seat belt use among federal workers. The OSHA Web site also provides case studies of corporate fleet safety initiatives in the U.S., and guidance for employers produced in collaboration with NETS and NHTSA.

=== Department of State ===
The U.S. Department of State provides safe travel and driving advice for 209 countries. This includes general advice on road safety for U.S. citizens traveling abroad48 and country-specific information based on reports provided by U.S. embassies. Although this information is not designed specifically for the work environment, it is comprehensive and up-to-date, and could easily be adapted for use by organizations whose employees and contractors are expected to drive outside the United States.

== ANSI/ASSE Z15.1 ==
The American Society of Safety Engineers (ASSE) spearheaded the development of the ANSI/ASSE Z15.1 standard, Safe Practices for Motor Vehicle Operations, an American National Standards Institute (ANSI) consensus standard for fleet safety targeted at organizations operating small- and medium-sized vehicles not covered by FMCSA regulations for large trucks and buses. The original standard covers the following topics:

- Management, leadership, commitment, and administration
- The importance of written policies covering general operating rules, safety belts, impaired driving, distracted driving, routing, and scheduling
- Driver qualifications, management, training, and record keeping
- Vehicle acquisition, modifications, equipment, inspection, checks, maintenance, and replacement criteria
- Incident reporting, review, and analysis, including methods for calculating key performance indicators for vehicle safety
- Sample policies for business and personal use of vehicles owned or leased by the company, business use of vehicles owned or leased by the employee, and use of rental vehicles

In 2012, ANSI approved the first revisions to the standard, the majority of which address driver behavior and organizational policies:

- Language that calls for employer policies to require employees in all seating positions to use safety belts
- Language that places fatigue management in the realm of organizational responsibility as well as with the individual driver
- A new section on journey management by the employer (e.g., evaluating whether work can be performed without road travel, planning routes to avoid road construction or congested areas, or allowing employees the option to stop for the night if they are fatigued)
- Expanded information on distracted driving, including a sample employer policy as an appendix

To date, ANSI/ASSE Z15.1 has not been formally evaluated with respect to its adoption by U.S. companies or its impact on road safety performance in organizations that have implemented it. However, like the United Kingdom's Driving at Work guidance on work-related road safety, ANSI/ASSE Z15.1 informs employers of core requirements for occupational road safety programs and has generated increased awareness of the need to manage occupational road risk.

== Network of Employers for Traffic Safety ==
The Network of Employers for Traffic Safety (NETS) is a not-for-profit organization dedicated to improving the health and safety of employers, their families, and the community by preventing traffic crashes on and off the job. NETS was established more than 20 years ago with support from the National Highway Traffic Safety Administration (NHTSA) on the premise that in addition to implementing road safety programs in the workforce, employers could exert a major influence on traffic safety in workers’ families and communities. Throughout its history, NETS has been governed by a Board of Directors with representation from private sector employers and insurers as well as government agencies (ex officio). Originally, NETS worked primarily through a large network of state-based coordinators, many of whom were based in governors’ highway safety offices. Today, due in part to declining resources at state level, NETS is active in only a few states, and its work is done primarily through its member companies and Board of Directors.

Since its inception, NETS has delivered its signature road safety campaign, Drive Safely Work Week (DSWW), through member companies and state partners. DSWW typically has an overarching theme, with specific topics or learning points delivered each day during the course of a week in October. As technology has evolved, the mode of delivery for DSWW materials has shifted from printed materials to electronic materials that may be downloaded from the Internet. Over the years, prevention of distracted driving has been a common theme for DSWW. In 2010 and 2011, NETS worked in partnership with the U.S. DOT to offer DSWW campaign materials on distracted driving free of charge, an arrangement that resulted in over 6,000 organizations downloading materials during 2010. One of NETS's member services is the “Safety in Numbers” fleet safety benchmarking program, which provides international benchmarking services, with both qualitative and quantitative data from large companies representing various industry sectors. As a group, NETS member companies participating in the benchmarking program operate nearly half a million vehicles worldwide, with more than nine billion miles driven annually (Network of Employers for Traffic Safety, unpublished data).

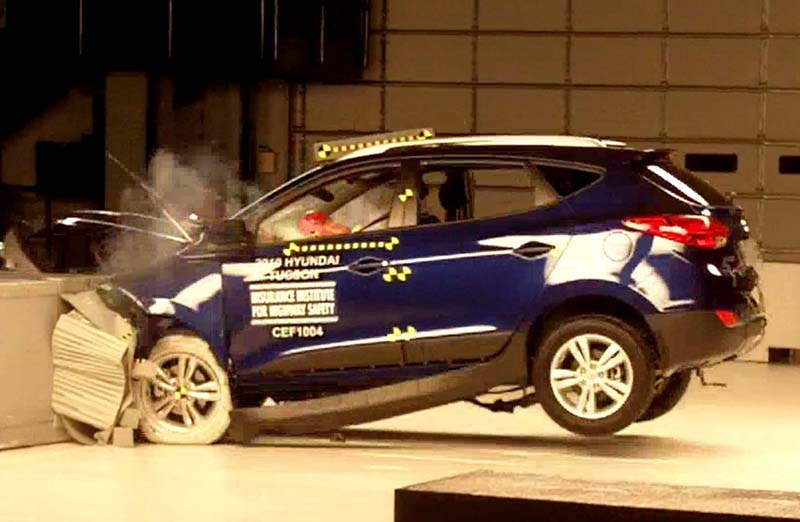
Crash test performed at the Insurance Institute for Highway Safety Vehicle Research Center.

== Other agencies and groups ==
Other resources available from sources in the United States include:

- National Safety Council (NSC): This not-for-profit organization has developed a number of products to support occupational road safety. One example is the “Cell Phone Policy Kit”, which is designed to assist organizations in implementing policies and communicating them to employees. NSC provides other online road safety resources of value to employers; its road safety page links to resources on distracted driving, teen driving, and its employer road safety initiative “Our Driving Concern.” NSC also offers a comprehensive safety manual for use by organizational fleet managers, which contains numerous checklists and sample policies as well as articles on topics such as distracted driving.
- Insurance Institute for Highway Safety (IIHS): IIHS conducts crash tests of motor vehicles manufactured for use in the U.S., the results of which can inform purchasing decisions by fleet owners. IIHS also provides current state-by-state information on road safety legislation related to safety belts, mobile phone use, text messaging, and graduated driver's licensing.
- The Transportation Research Board (TRB), an arm of the National Academies, provides a forum for wide dissemination of academic research results related to occupational road safety. Its annual meeting attracts thousands of researchers from around the world, and outstanding papers from the meeting are published in the TRB peer-reviewed journal, the Transportation Research Record. To date, most of the research published through TRB has emphasized truck and bus safety, and this is reflected in the composition of relevant TRB standing committees. TRB also has a series of publications, the Commercial Truck and Bus Safety Synthesis Program, which produces succinct reviews of a wide range of health and safety topics such as driver wellness, fatigue management, driver selection, and management practices.
- U.S. DOT initiative on distracted driving: Former Secretary of Transportation Ray LaHood has made prevention of distracted driving a policy priority within the Department. National summits on the topic were held in 2009 and 2010, the second of which emphasized the role of employer policies in reducing distraction-related crashes. A variety of materials to encourage employer and employee involvement may be downloaded.

== See also ==
- Michael H. Belzer concerning truck safety
- Construction site safety
- Global road safety for workers
- List of motor vehicle deaths in U.S. by year
- Management systems for road safety
- National Safety Council
- Road traffic safety
- Seat belt legislation in the United States
- Traffic collision
- Transportation safety in the United States
