= Management systems for road safety =

Progress in the area of prevention is formulated in an environment of beliefs, called paradigms as can be seen in the next table. Some of them can be referred to as professional folklore, i.e. a widely supported set of beliefs with no real basis. For example, the “accident-prone driver” was a belief that was supported by the data in the sense that a small number of drivers do participate in a disproportionate number of crashes, it follows that the identification and removal of this drivers will reduce crashes. A more scientific analysis of the data indicate that this phenomenon can be explained simply by the random nature of the accidents, and not for a specific error-prone attitude of such drivers.

Evolution of road safety paradigms
ASPECTS	PARADIGM I	PARADIGM II	PARADIGM III	PARADIGM IV
Decennia of dominating position	1900 - 1925/35	1925/35 - 1965/70	1965/70 - 1980/85	1980/85 - present
Description	Control of motorised carriage	Mastering traffic situations	Managing traffic system	Managing transport system
Main disciplines involved	Law enforcement	Car and road engineering, psychology	Traffic engineering, traffic medicine, advanced statistics	Advanced technology, systems analysis, sociology, communications
Terms used about unwanted events	Collision	Accident	Crash, casualty	Suffering, costs
Premise concerning unsafety	Transitional problem, passing stage of maladjustment	Individual problem, inadequate moral and skills	Defective traffic system	Risk exposure
Data ideals in research	Basic statistics, answers on “What”	Causes of accidents; “Why”	Cost/benefit ratio of means “How”	Multidimensional
Organisational form of safety work	Separate efforts on trial and error basis	Co-ordinated efforts on voluntary basis	Programmed efforts, authorised politically	Decentralisation, local management
Typical countermeasures	Vehicle codes and inspection, school patrols	The three E's doctrine, screening of accident prone drivers	Combined samples of measures for diminishing risks	Networking and pricing
Effects	Gradual increase in traffic risks and health risks	Rapid increase of health risk with decreasing traffic risk	Successive cycles of decrease of health risks and traffic risks	Continuous reduction of serious road accidents

From: OECD Road Transport Research

== National programs ==
A prerequisite for progress in this area is to introduce national programs with clear and quantifiable objectives, some examples are:

- Chile 0% growth in fatalities, (down from historical 5-7% annual growth), (CONASET, 1993)
- EU, 40% reduction in fatalities for 2010
- Denmark 40% reduction for 2000
- Finland 65% reduction for 2005
- United Kingdom 33% reduction for 2000
- United States No more than 1.0 fatality for every 100 million vehicle miles traveled (VMT) by 2008

Sweden has developed a new concept to improve road safety called "Vision Zero". Vision Zero is conceived from the ethical base that it can never be acceptable that people are killed or seriously injured when moving within the road transport system. It centres around an explicit goal, and develops into a highly pragmatic and scientifically based strategy which challenges the traditional approach to road safety.

Vision Zero: strategic principles

- The traffic system has to adapt to take better account of the needs, mistakes and vulnerabilities of road users.
- The level of violence that the human body can tolerate without being killed or seriously injured forms the basic parameter in the design of the road transport system.
- Vehicle speed is the most important regulating factor for a safe road traffic. It should be determined by the technical standard of both roads and vehicle so as not to exceed the level of violence that the human body can tolerate.

While the concept envisages responsibility for safety amongst the designers and users of the system, the designer has the final responsibility for "fail-safe" measures.

Vision Zero: system designer has primary responsibility

- System designers are responsible for the design, operation and the use of the road transport system and are thereby responsible for the level of safety within the entire system.
- Road users are responsible for following the rules for using the road transport system set by the system designers.
- If the users fail to comply with these rules due to a lack of knowledge, acceptance or ability, the system designers are required to take the necessary further steps to counteract people being killed or injured.

== Management systems ==
Modern Road Safety makes a distinction between the situation and the management systems necessary to control it, with prevention activities that largely exceeds the self-evident fields of the traditional 3 E (Engineering, Enforcement, Education) approach, first introduced in 1925. Modern Management systems have the aims of be inclusive, i.e. to include explicitly all activities part of such system. Forming an integrated whole

The more extensive effort to obtain a comprehensive, holistic design of a road safety system, with the direct participation of 123 persons, representatives of different areas of activities, was done in Chile, (CONASET, 1993), utilizing the methodology for the design of social systems developed by Del Valle (1992). The result was the design of the control apparatus for this situation, called “Road Safety System”, defined by its components. An informal test of its completeness can be done simply by consider this management system without any of its components, for example if we remove rescue we simply lose opportunities to save human life coming from activities in this area. It can be used as an outline to assess the completeness of national road safety programs.

Please note than the following table is a systems definition i.e. it is supposed that is parts form an integrated whole.

Road Safety Management System
A Drivers, Training & Licensing A-1 Training of professional drivers A-2 Training of car drivers A-3 Driver’s testing A-4 Training of driving instructors A-5 Licensing of instructors A-6 Licensing of practical examiners A-7 Driving schools supervision A-8 Permanent grading of drivers	E Enforcement E-1 Drivers enforcement E-2 Technical conditions of vehicles E-3 Technical conditions of roads E-4 Inspection of transport services E-5 Pedestrian enforcement
B Management Of Vehicle Quality B-1 Technical specifications B-2 Safety equipment B-3 New vehicle’s certification B-4 Technical inspection B-5 Supervision of vehicle inspection shops B-6 Supervision of maintenance shops B-7 Mechanics Training	F Judicial Action F-1 Prosecution of infractions F-2 Efficient infraction systems F-3 Law modification F-4 Accident investigation F-5 Civil responsibility of the state
C Management Of Roads And Public Space C1 Traffic management C2 Signs & markings C3 Safety audit C4 Black spots C5 Maintenance C6 Road safety elements C7 Rest areas for drivers and bus stops C8 Pedestrian facilities C9 Bicycle facilities C10 Land use planning	G Accident Control And Insurance G1 Comprehensive rescue system G2 Comprehensive rehabilitation system G3 Insurance coverage
D Management Of Transport Services D1 Remuneration systems D2 Work conditions D3 Permanent grading of personnel D4 Dangerous loads and stowing D5 School children’s transport	H Research & Information H1 Integrated information systems H2 Drivers and infractions register H3 Vehicles register H4 Accident register H5 Preventive indicators register H6 Register of instructors and examiners H7 Accidents studies H8 Users information
	I Education And Communications I1 Curricula I2 Teachers training I3 Didactical materiel I4 Students protection I5 Campaigns

== Semantics ==
The field of Road safety is handicapped by the terminology. Words have power to them that conveys impressions as well as meanings, phenomena that in this case results in sub-optimal approaches to prevention, as follows:

=== Road safety ===
The name “Road safety” have conveyed that in this field the activities need to concentrate on items that properly belong to roads and, by extension, to the roads authorities, keeping a reduced scope of activities in a number of different areas, in spite of their potentially significant contributions. For example, in the UK, Burrough, (1991) indicates that only one-third of the target reduction will be delivered by road safety engineering measures while Koornstra ( 2002) indicates “The contribution of local road engineering to the fatality reductions between 1980 and 2000 are estimated to be 4% for Sweden, 10% for Britain, and 5% for the Netherlands”. Whereas TEC (2003), quotes a research from the Imperial College, London that indicates than the progress in medical technology and care made a significant contribution to the 45% fall of fatalities during the last 20 years, and account for 700 lives saved annually in the UK, and further puts forward that the lack of consideration of the benefits coming from the medical area, suggests that road safety is probably less effective that thought. It is remarkable that implicitly the author of the research doesn't consider medical activities as a component of a road safety management system.

It reflects confusion between the space where this phenomenon occurs (mainly roads) and the design of the Management systems to control it, in what “Roads” is only a 11% of the activities (one area out of nine in previous table).

=== Accident ===
The use of the word “accident” with its connotations of being and unavoidable event, weaken the resolve to intervene in order to reduce crashes and the resulting harm. Evans (1991) argues that the word “crash” indicates in a simple factual way what is observed, while “Accident” seems to suggest in addition a general explanation of why it occurred.

=== Cause of accidents ===
Road safety recognizes that crashes, and their consequences, are multifactor events, Ogden (1996) indicates: “An approach based in notions of cause and blame is simplistic in the extreme”. In short, crashes have factors not causes .

=== Problem-solving ===
Old approaches emphasize the concept of problem-solving in road safety, but it is more correct to recognize that road safety activities do not solve problems. For instance, when a safer road design is implemented, hopefully the number of crashes, or their seriousness, will go down, but they will not disappear. It is more correct to say the implementation of correct policies, programs and measures will reduce numbers or consequences of crashes, but they will not be ´´solved´´.

This realization is important, because it changes the focus from a problem that will go away if we devote enough resources to it, to a situation requiring on-going management. This management in turn requires the development of scientifically based techniques, which will enable us to predict with confidence that safety resources are well-spent and likely to be effective.

== See also ==
- Road safety
- Traffic psychology
- Work-related road safety in the United States
- Haddon Matrix
