= Fatality Assessment and Control Evaluation =

Series of field studies conducted by NIOSH

The Fatality Assessment and Control Evaluation (FACE) program's goal is the prevention of occupational fatality. Program elements include:

- Tracking all work-related acute trauma fatalities.
- Conducting investigations of a select number of these incidents.
- Distributing information for the prevention of future fatal injuries.

The FACE Program is funded by the National Institute for Occupational Safety and Health or NIOSH which is a branch of the Centers for Disease Control and Prevention. The Bureau of Labor Statistics (BLS), a unit of the United States Department of Labor, also tracks occupational fatalities.

The FACE program currently has two components:

- NIOSH In-house FACE began in 1982. Participating states voluntarily notify NIOSH of traumatic occupational fatalities resulting from targeted causes of death that have included confined spaces, electrocutions, machine-related, falls from elevation, and logging. In-house FACE is currently targeting investigations of deaths associated with machinery, deaths of youths under 18 years of age, deaths of Hispanic workers, and street/highway construction work zone fatalities.
- NIOSH State-based FACE began in 1989. Currently, nine State health or labor departments have cooperative agreements with NIOSH for conducting surveillance, targeted investigations, and prevention activities at the State level using the FACE model. The nine FACE states are: California, Iowa, Kentucky, Massachusetts, Michigan, New Jersey, New York, Oregon, and Washington

== FACE publications ==
- Fatality Data Summaries - summaries of the fatalities and a list of the incidents.
- Fatality Investigation Reports are reports describing root-case based investigations of fatal incidents.
- Fatality Narratives are one-page descriptions of recent fatal incidents.
- FACE Fatal Facts are bulletins that have been developed to address specific workplace hazards.

Work-related injuries in the United States claim the lives of more than 5,000 individuals annually. Men are most frequently on-the-job fatality victims. Workers' Memorial Day is celebrated annually to honor those who died on the job.
