= Michael H. Belzer =

American academic and former truck driver

- Education: Cornell University (PhD)
- Occupation: Professor of economics
- Employer: Wayne State University
- Known for: Internationally-recognized expertise on trucking industry and deregulation
- Works: Sweatshops on Wheels: Winners and Losers in Trucking Deregulation (2000)

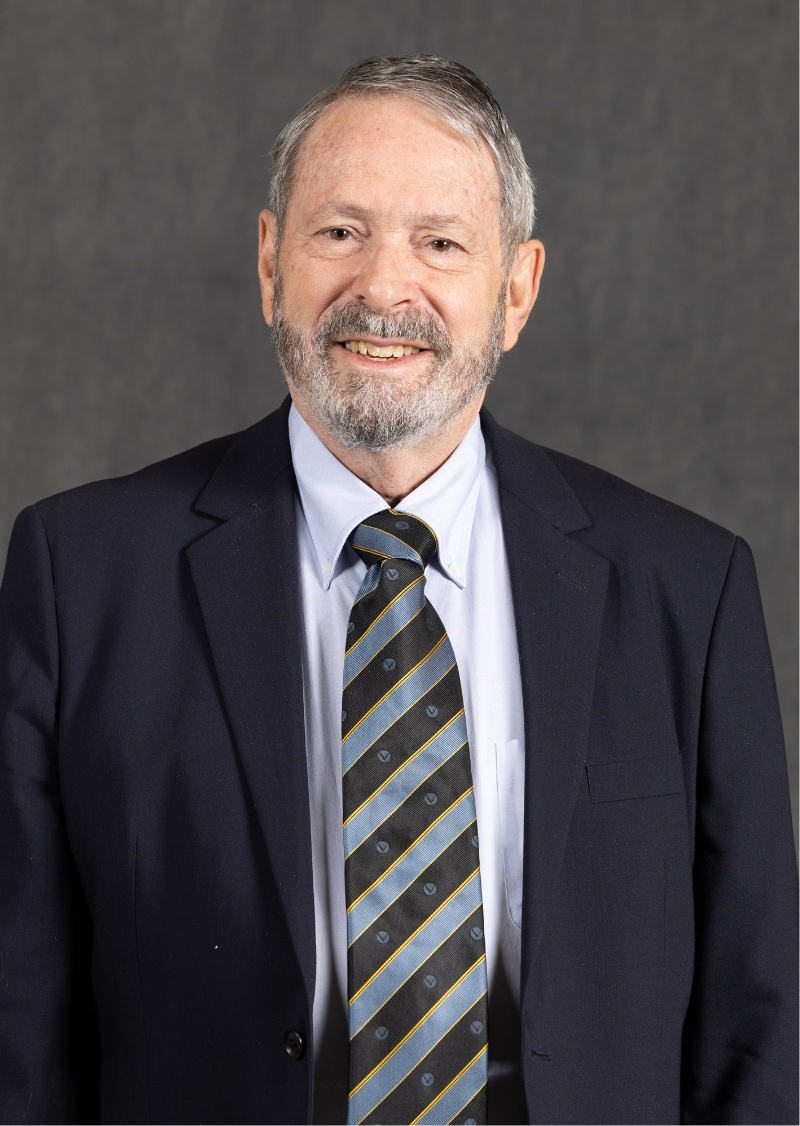

Michael H. Belzer is an American academic and former truck driver, known as an internationally recognized expert on the trucking industry, especially the institutional and economic impact of deregulation. He is a professor in the economics department at Wayne State University. He is the author of Sweatshops on Wheels: Winners and Losers in Trucking Deregulation (Oxford University Press, 2000). Along with Gregory M. Saltzman, he coauthored Truck Driver Occupational Safety and Health: 2003 Conference Report and Selective Literature Review, National Institute for Occupational Safety and Health, 2007. He has written many peer-reviewed articles on trucking industry economics, labor, occupational safety and health, infrastructure, and operational issues.

== Background ==
For ten years, he was a long-haul tank truck driver, one of the leaders of Teamsters for a Democratic Union, and a member of the International Brotherhood of Teamsters. These experiences had a direct impact on his research, writing and career.

Belzer received his Ph.D. from Cornell University in 1993. His thesis, "Collective Bargaining in the Trucking Industry: The Effects of Institutional and Economic Restructuring," focused on the transformational dynamic of changed regulation and institutional structure on industrial relations in the trucking industry.

== Research ==
Belzer studies the industrial and labor relations of the trucking industry, including motor carrier safety, driver safety and health, and intermodal freight and logistics. He is a proponent of “safe rates” and believes that driver working conditions and compensation is a major determinant of motor vehicle driver safety and health.

His book Sweatshops on Wheels was critically well received. Low pay, bad working conditions and unsafe conditions have been a direct result of deregulation. "[This book] argues that trucking embodies the dark side of the new economy." "Conditions are so poor and the pay system so unfair that long-haul companies compete with the fast-food industry for workers. Most long-haul carriers experience 100% annual driver turnover." As the Atlanta Journal-Constitution wrote: "The cabs of 18-wheelers have become the sweatshops of the new millennium, with some truckers toiling up to 95 hours per week for what amounts to barely more than the minimum wage. [This book] is eye-opening in its appraisal of what the trucking industry has become."

== Published works ==
- Belzer, Michael H. (August 24, 2000). Sweatshops on Wheels: Winners and Losers in Trucking Deregulation (Hardcover). USA: Oxford University Press. pp. 272 pages. ISBN 0-19-512886-9. ISBN 978-0-19-512886-4.

=== Research reports ===
- "Pay and Safety Report, September 2002"
- "The Jobs Tunnel: The Economic Impact of Adequate Border-Crossing Infrastructure" (Nov. 2003).

=== Selected scholarly publications ===
- "Pay Incentives and Truck Driver Safety: Case Study." With co-authors Daniel A. Rodriguez and Felipe Targa. Abstract published in Compendium of Papers CD-ROM of the 82nd Annual Meeting of the Transportation Research Board, January 12–16, 2003, Washington, DC.
- "Effects of Truck Driver Wages and Working Conditions on Highway Safety: Case Study." With Daniel Rodríguez, Marta Rocha, and Asad J. Khattak. Abstract published in Compendium of Papers CD-ROM of the 82nd Annual Meeting of the Transportation Research Board, January 12–16, 2003, Washington, DC.
- "Effects of Truck Driver Wages and Working Conditions on Highway Safety: Case Study." With Daniel Rodríguez, Marta Rocha, and Asad J. Khattak. Transportation Research Record: Journal of the Transportation Research Board, no. 1833 (Freight Policy, Economics, and Logistics; Truck Transportation), pp. 95–102. 2003.
- "The Case for Strengthened Motor Carrier Hours of Service Regulations" (with Gregory M. Saltzman). Transportation Journal, Volume 41, No. 4 Summer 2002, pp. 51–71.
- "Trucking: Collective Bargaining Takes a Rocky Road." in Collective Bargaining: Current Developments and Future Challenges, edited by Paul F. Clark, John T. Delaney, and Ann C. Frost. Champaign, IL: Industrial Relations Research Association 2002, pp. 311–342
- "Technological Innovation and the Trucking Industry: Information Revolution and the Effect on the Work Process." Journal of Labor Research, Volume 23, No. 3; Summer 2002, pp. 375–396.
- "Truck Driver Security Issues: The New World of Secure Surface Transportation." Perspectives on Work: The Magazine of the IRRA, Vol. 6, No. 1; June 2002, pp. 13–15.
- "Worker Representation in the Truckload Sector: What Do Truckers Want?" in the Proceedings of the 53rd Annual Meeting of the Industrial Relations Research Association, January 5–7, 2001, New Orleans, Louisiana.
- "Deregulation and Decentralization: The Impact on Employment Relations." Twenty First Century Labor Studies International Academic Conference," Chinese Culture University. Taipei, Taiwan, Republic of China. October 12–13, 2000, pp. 1-45.
- "Government Oversight and Union Democracy: Lessons from the Teamsters Experience" (with Richard Hurd). Journal of Labor Research, Volume XX, Number 3, Summer 1999.
- "Labor Market Regulation: Balancing the Benefits and Costs of Competition" (with Dale Belman). In Government Regulation of the Employment Relationship, Bruce Kaufman, ed. Madison, Wisconsin: Industrial Relations Research Association. 1997.
- "Collective Bargaining in the Trucking Industry: Do the Teamsters Still Count?". Industrial and Labor Relations Review. 48 (4). July 1, 1995. Archived from the original on November 4, 2012 – via HighBeam Research.
- "Labor Law Reform: Taking a Lesson from the Trucking Industry." Proceedings of the Forty-Seventh Annual Meeting of the Industrial Relations Research Association. Washington, DC. January 6–8, 1995. Madison, Wisconsin: Industrial Relations Research Association. 1995.
- "The Motor Carrier Industry: Truckers and Teamsters Under Siege." In Contemporary Collective Bargaining in the Private Sector, edited by Paula B. Voos. Madison, Wisconsin: Industrial Relations Research Association. 1994.
- "Paying the Toll: Economic Deregulation of the Trucking Industry." Washington, D.C.: Economic Policy Institute. 1994.

== See also ==
- Work-related road safety in the United States
