= Occupational fatality =

Death while performing a task

An occupational fatality is a death that occurs while a person is at work or performing work-related tasks. Occupational fatalities are also commonly called "occupational deaths" or "work-related deaths/fatalities" and can occur in any industry or occupation.

== Common causes of occupational fatality ==
=== Worldwide ===
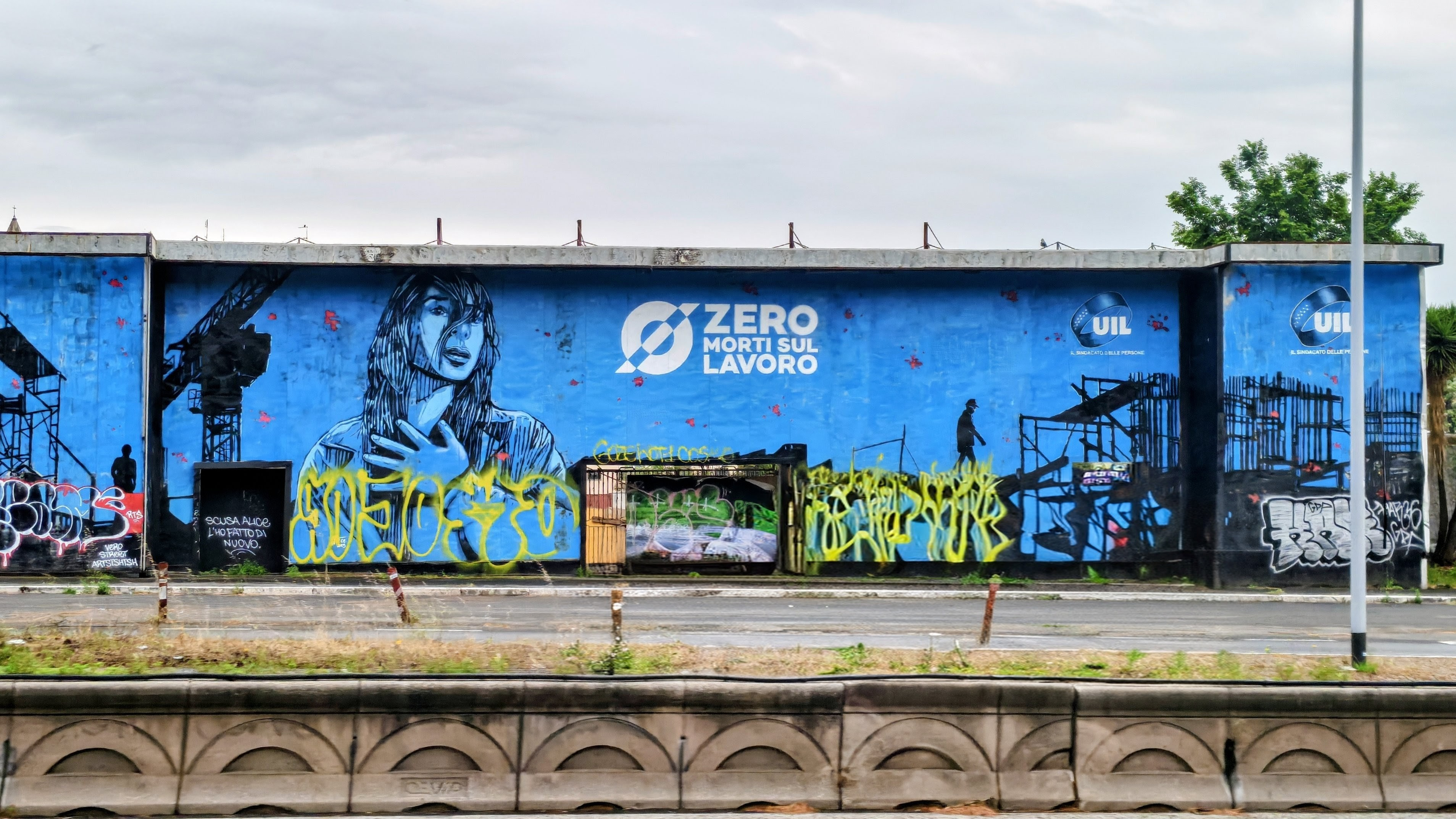
This mural, titled "Zero Morti sul Lavoro" (Zero Deaths at Work), is located in Rome, Italy, on the exterior wall of the former Fiera di Roma

Among the most prevalent occupational risk factors, the highest attributable deaths in 2016 were long working hours (>50 hours per week) with over 745,000 deaths. In second place was occupational exposure to particulate matter, gases and fumes at over 450,000 deaths, followed by occupational injuries at over 363,000 deaths. In fourth place was occupational exposure to asbestos at over 209,000 deaths and in fifth place occupational exposure to silica at over 42,000 deaths

Common causes of occupational fatalities include falls, machine-related incidents, motor vehicle accidents, exposure to harmful substances or environment, homicides, suicides, fires, and explosions. In 2021, 3.6 of every 100,000 full-time workers experienced a fatal workplace injury. Oftentimes, occupational fatalities can be prevented.

=== United States ===
In the United States, 5,070 fatal work injuries were recorded in 2024, down 4.0 percent from 5,283 in 2023. The fatal work injury rate fell from 3.5 to 3.3 fatalities per 100,000 full-time-equivalent workers. Transportation incidents were the most frequent fatal event, accounting for 38.2 percent of the total, while falls, slips, and trips caused 844 fatalities.

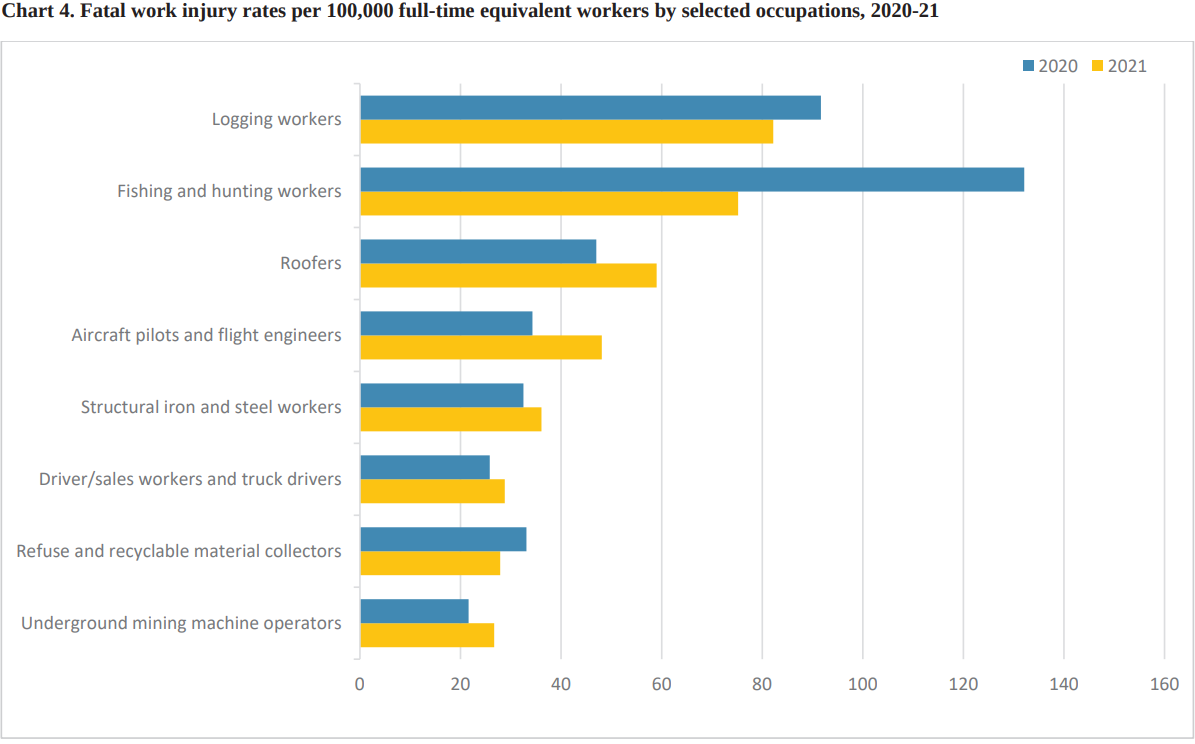
Fatal work injury rates per 100,000 full-time equivalent workers by selected occupations from 2020 to 2021.

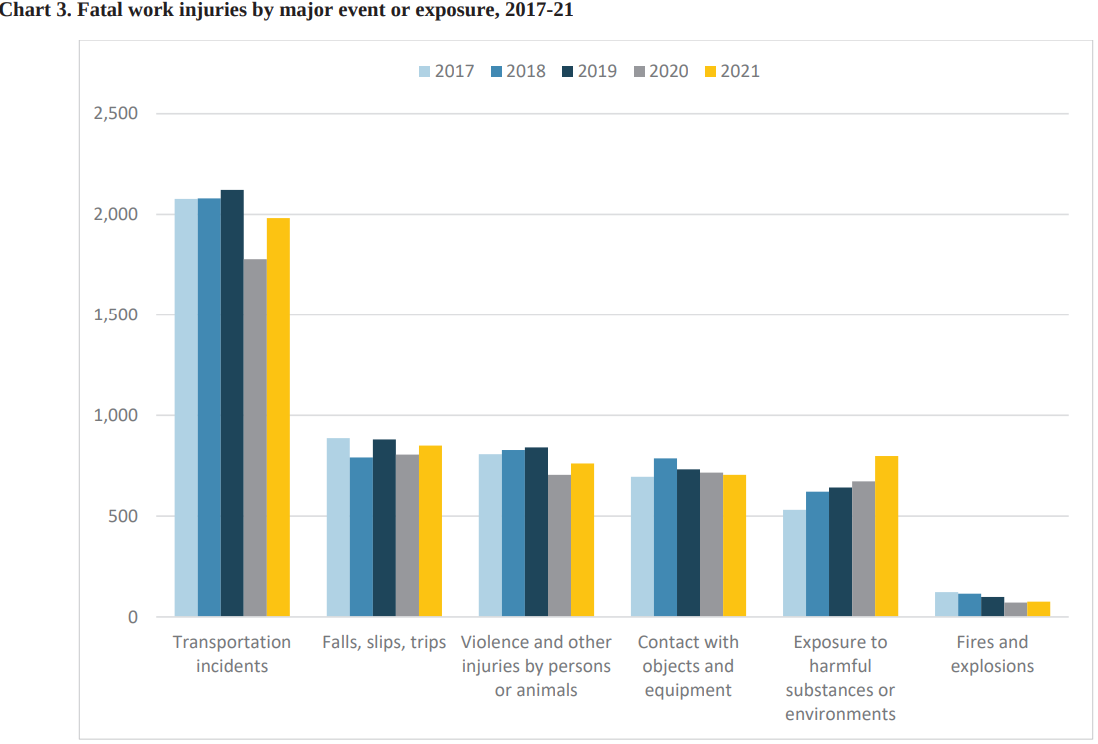
Fatal work injuries by major event or exposure from 2017 to 2021.

== Incidence ==
Data on the number of occupational fatalities per 100,000 workers is available from the International Labour Organization for various countries; the ILO says for most countries the rate is less than ten per 100,000 each year. However, a 1999 paper says the ILO figures are underestimates—for example the agricultural sector, which has a higher than average fatality rate, is not reported by many countries. The paper estimates that the number of fatal occupational accidents in the world in 1994 was 335,000, or 14 per 100,000 workers. The paper also estimated there were 158,000 fatalities commuting between work and home, and 325,000 fatal occupational diseases, for a total of 818,000 fatalities.

=== International differences ===
According to statistics from the International Labour Organization, occupational fatalities per 100,000 workers ranges from 0.1 to 25, with a worldwide average of 4.0 per every 100,000 workers. Panama and El Salvador have the lowest occupational fatality rates at 0.2 and 0.1 per 100,000 respectively. The country of the highest occupational fatality rate is Cuba at 25 per every 100,000 workers, followed by Burudi and Egypt at 13.8 and 10.7 per 100,000 respectively. The World Health Organization and International Labour Organization estimate that over 1.9 million people died as a result of work-related injures and diseases in 2016. 81% of these deaths are contributed to a variety of non-communicable diseases, chronic obstructive pulmonary disease (COPD), stroke, and ischemic heart disease, accounting for 1.2 million deaths. Over the course of 16 years (2000–2016), international workplace deaths fell by 14%. During the same period, heart disease–related deaths associated with long working hours increased by 41%.

=== Gender differences ===
According to United States Bureau of Labor Statistics, men made up 91.4 percent of all workplace fatalities and 85.5 percent of intentional injuries by a person in 2021. In the European Union, men made up 92.5 percent of all workplace fatalities in 2020 and 66.5 percent of all injuries that required 4 or more days of absence.

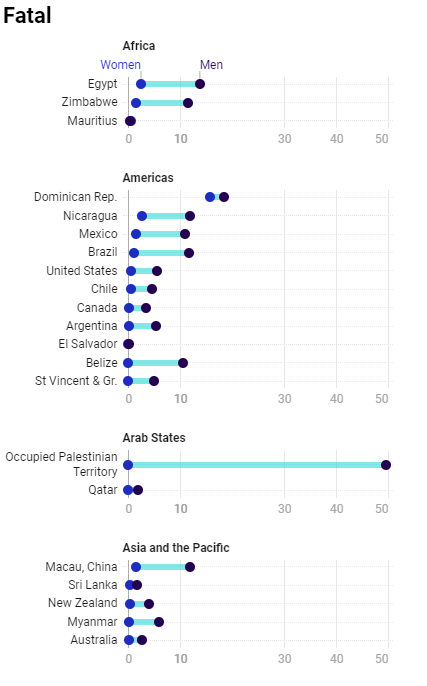
Occupational fatality per 100,000 workers by sex – Americas, Africa, Arab States, Asia and the Pacific

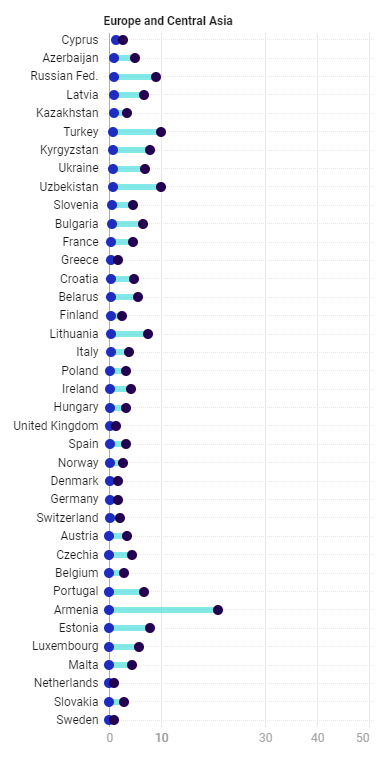
Occupational fatality per 100,000 workers by sex – Europe and Central Asia

== Diseases & illnesses ==
According to the WHO/ILO Joint Estimates of the Work-related Burden of Disease and Injury, 2000-2016: Global Monitoring Report, the majority of work-related deaths were due to respiratory and cardiovascular disease. Although not always obvious, there are many workplaces in the world that are full of harmful inhalants. When this occurs, it leads to various diseases and illnesses that are fatal to humans.

The World Health Organization found that non-communicable diseases accounted for the majority of occupational fatalities. The actual percentage is said to be 81 percent. Some of the largest causes of death are things like chronic obstructive pulmonary disease, which accounted for 450,000 deaths. Strokes accounted for 400,000 deaths and ischaemic heart disease totaled 350,000 deaths. The remaining 19 percent of deaths were related to occupational injuries that tallied to 360,000 deaths. In several studies, the WHO determined that there are many factors and reasons for these illnesses to be so prevalent. Most of them strictly come from being exposed in the workplace to things such as carcinogens, air pollution, asthmagens, and other toxins. Many of these deaths come from long periods of exposure due to long workdays.

== Prevention ==
Occupational fatalities are preventable. Prevention of occupational fatalities depends on the understanding that worker safety is not only the responsibility of the worker, but is also the primary responsibility of the employer. Employers must train all employees in the appropriate safety procedures and maintain a safe working environment so that fatalities are less likely to occur. An occupational fatality is not just the fault of the deceased worker; instead, it is the combination of unsafe work environments, insufficient safety training, and negligible employee supervision that contribute fatal incidents. As a result, it is imperative that an employer address all the potential risk factors at the workplace and educate all employees in safe work practices and risk awareness.

In order to perform adequate risk assessment of injuries that occur in the workplace, health and safety professionals use resources such as the Haddon Matrix. This model assesses the risks leading up to, during, and after a death in order to prevent future incidents of a similar nature. Employers and employees can learn how to identify risk factors in their work environment in order to avoid incidents that may result in death.

== Research, regulation, reporting and recommendations ==
=== United States ===
The Occupational Safety and Health Administration (OSHA) requires that all employers maintain a record of occupational injuries, illnesses and fatalities. Occupational fatalities must be reported to OSHA within eight hours of the incident. Failure to do so can result in legal action against the employer including citations and fines. Employers are responsible for staying current on OSHA standards and enforcing them in their own workplace. State OSHA organizations exist in twenty-eight states and are required to have the same or more rigorous standards than the federal OSHA standards. In these states, employers must abide by their state's regulations. It is not the responsibility of the employee to stay current on the OSHA standards.

In addition to OSHA, the National Institute for Occupational Safety and Health (NIOSH) analyzes workplace injury and illness data from all fifty states as well as provides support for state-based projects in occupational health and safety. Under NIOSH, the Fatality Assessment and Control Evaluation (FACE) Program tracks and investigates occupational fatalities in order to provide recommendations for prevention. A voluntary program for individual states created in 1989, FACE is active in California, Iowa, Kentucky, Massachusetts, Michigan, New Jersey, New York, Oregon, and Washington. The primary responsibilities of the state FACE programs are to track occupational fatalities in their state, investigate select fatalities, and provide recommendations for prevention. As part of the prevention efforts, FACE programs also produce extensive prevention education materials that are disseminated to employees, employers, unions, and state organizations.

The Census of Fatal Occupational Injuries (CFOI), within the U.S. Department of Labor, compiles national fatality statistics and is the key, comprehensive system in the surveillance of occupational fatalities in the United States.

Many other non-governmental organizations also work to prevent occupational fatalities. Trade associations and unions play an active role in protecting workers and disseminating prevention information. The National Safety Council also works to prevent occupational fatalities as well as provide resources to employers and employees.
