= Census of Fatal Occupational Injuries =

The Census of Fatal Occupational Injuries, or the CFOI Program is a Federal/State cooperative program that publishes data on fatal cases of work-related injuries for all States, Territories, and New York City. The CFOI has detailed information on those who died at work due to a traumatic injury. CFOI data include all fatalities that occurred in the reference year that were the result of a workplace injury, regardless of when the injury occurred.

State data presenting the number and frequency of work-related injuries, illnesses, and fatal injuries are available from two BLS programs: the BLS Survey of Occupational Injuries and Illnesses (SOII) and the BLS Census of Fatal Occupational Injuries (CFOI). SOII provides estimates for nonfatal cases of work-related injuries and illnesses from participating States and Territories that are recorded by employers under Occupational Safety and Health Administration (OSHA) recordkeeping guidelines. CFOI publishes data on fatal cases of work-related injuries for all States, Territories, and New York City.

== History ==
The Bureau of Labor Statistics collects nationwide information on work-related fatalities in its Census of Fatal Occupational Injuries (CFOI) which was conducted for the first time in 1992. Each work-related fatality is identified, verified, and profiled using multiple source documents; these diverse data sources include death certificates, workers' compensation records, and reports to Federal and State agencies. Cross-referencing these documents provides detailed information about each work related fatality including worker characteristics, equipment involved, circumstances of the event, and details of the injury. The detailed data are then aggregated and used to promote safety efforts by employers, employees, and others.

== Dangerous Jobs ==
Dangerous occupations are identified by analyzing fatality rates. Fatality rates depict the risk of incurring a fatal work injury for workers in a given employment group (usually occupation), expressed as the proportion of fatalities per standard measure (usually per 100,000 workers). This allows risks to be compared among different employment groups. To produce a fatality rate, the number of fatal work injuries in a given occupation is divided by the number of employed persons in that occupation, and multiplied by 100,000. The Current Population Survey (CPS) is the source for the employment measures. The advantages of using the CPS for employment data are that it is timely, the occupational classifications are the same as those used by CFOI, and the sampling universe covers the same population measured by CFOI. However, the CPS is based on a sample that, of necessity, has sampling errors; small occupational groups will have large sampling errors, or may go unreported.

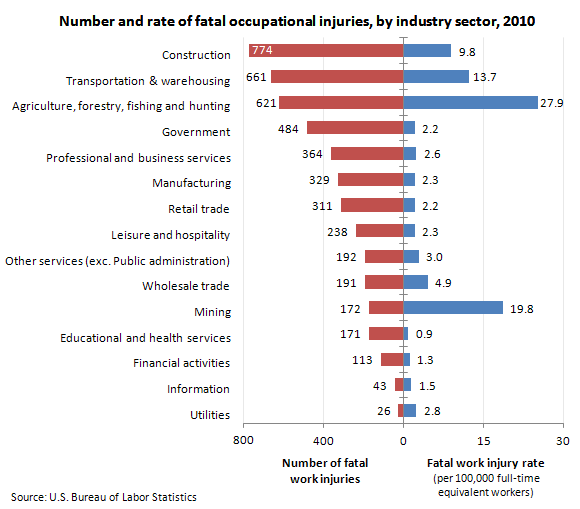
Occupations with very few fatalities or low employment are removed from annual fatality rate analyses because annual fluctuations in their fatality rates are too large for meaningful analysis. Instead, rates for these occupations can be averaged over a five or seven-year period to smooth annual fluctuations and provide better comparability to rates for other occupations. An average fatality rate is computed by dividing the sum of the fatalities across the years by the sum of the annual employment figures for the given occupation over the given time period, and multiplying by 100,000. In the U.S. the Bureau of Labor Statistics makes available extensive statistics on workplace accidents and injuries. For example:

== US States and Programs ==
In the United States in 2012, 4,383 workers died from job injuries, 92% of which were men, and nearly 3 million nonfatal workplace injuries & illness were reported which cost businesses a collective loss of $198.2 billion and 60 million workdays. In 2007, 5,488 workers died from job injuries, 92% of which were men, and 49,000 died from work-related injuries. NIOSH estimates that 4 million workers in the U.S. in 2007 suffered from non-fatal work related injuries or illnesses.

According to data from the National Institute for Occupational Safety and Health (NIOSH) and the Bureau of Labor Statistics, an average of 15 workers die from traumatic injuries each day in the United States, and an additional 200 workers are hospitalized.

In a study in the state of Washington, injured workers were followed for 14 years to determine the long term effects of work injury on employment. The work injuries resulted in an average of 1.06 years of lost productivity for each of the 31,588 allowed claims.

In 2010, 25% of occupational injuries and illnesses that were not fatal but caused work absences were related to injuries to the upper limb. In the United States, the Occupational Safety and Health Administration (OSHA) sets and enforces national standards for occupational safety across all sectors.

=== States and Territories with CFOI Programs ===
California, Colorado, Florida, Idaho, Maine, Massachusetts, Minnesota, Mississippi, Missouri, New Hampshire, New Jersey, New York State (including New York City), New York State (excluding New York City), New York City, Oklahoma, Oregon, Pennsylvania, Rhode Island, West Virginia, Wyoming

=== States and Territories with SOII Programs ===
California, Colorado, Florida, Idaho, Maine, Massachusetts, Minnesota, Mississippi, Missouri, New Hampshire, New Jersey, New York, Oklahoma, Oregon, Pennsylvania, Rhode Island, West Virginia, Wyoming

=== States and Territories with Joint CFOI/SOII Programs ===
Alabama, Alaska, Arizona, Arkansas, Connecticut, Delaware, District of Columbia, Georgia, Guam, Hawaii, Illinois, Indiana, Iowa, Kansas, Kentucky, Louisiana, Maryland, Michigan, Montana, Nebraska, Nevada, New Mexico, North Carolina, North Dakota, Ohio, Puerto Rico, South Carolina, South Dakota, Tennessee, Texas, Utah, Vermont, Virginia, Virgin Islands, Washington, Wisconsin

== See also ==
- Occupational safety and health
- Occupational disease
- Occupational exposure banding
- Safety culture
- Work accident
