= Helmet =

Protective headwear

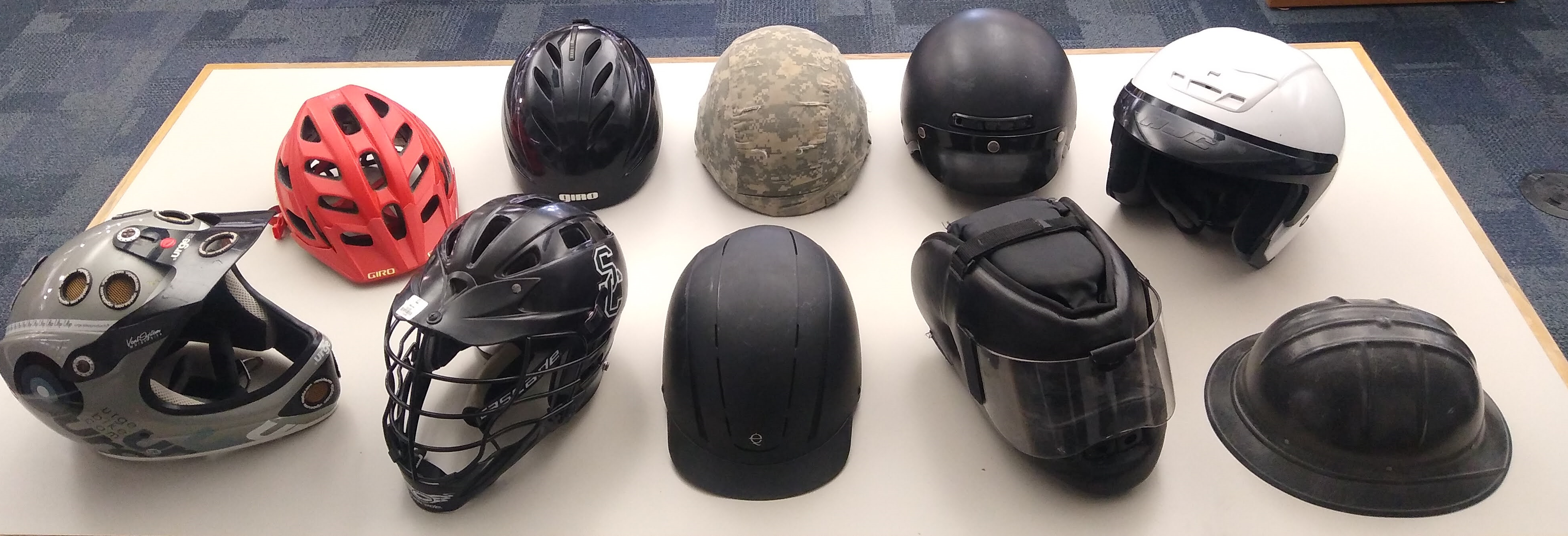
Ten different types of helmets with varying designs, materials and coverage. From left to right, in the top row: a Giro Radix Cycling Helmet, a Giro G10 Ski Helmet, a US Army UCP PASGT Helmet, an HJC CL Motorcycle helmet, and an HJC AC-3 Motorcycle helmet. In the bottom row: An Urge Down-O-Matic Full Face mountain bike helmet, a Cascade CPV-R Lacrosse helmet, an Equestrian riding helmet, a Blauer Spear High Gear Helmet for martial arts, and a vintage firefighter's helmet.

A helmet is a form of protective gear worn to protect the head. More specifically, a helmet complements the skull in protecting the human brain. Ceremonial or symbolic helmets (e.g., a policeman's helmet in the United Kingdom) without protective function are sometimes worn. Soldiers wear combat helmets, often made from Kevlar or other lightweight synthetic fibers.

The word helmet is derived from helm, an Old English word for a protective head covering.

Helmets are used for numerous sports (e.g., jockeys, American football, ice hockey, cricket, baseball, skiing, hurling and rock climbing); dangerous work activities such as construction, mining, riot police, military aviation, and in transportation (e.g. motorcycle helmets and bicycle helmets). Since the 1990s, most helmets are made from resin or plastic, which may be reinforced with fibers such as aramids.

== Designs ==
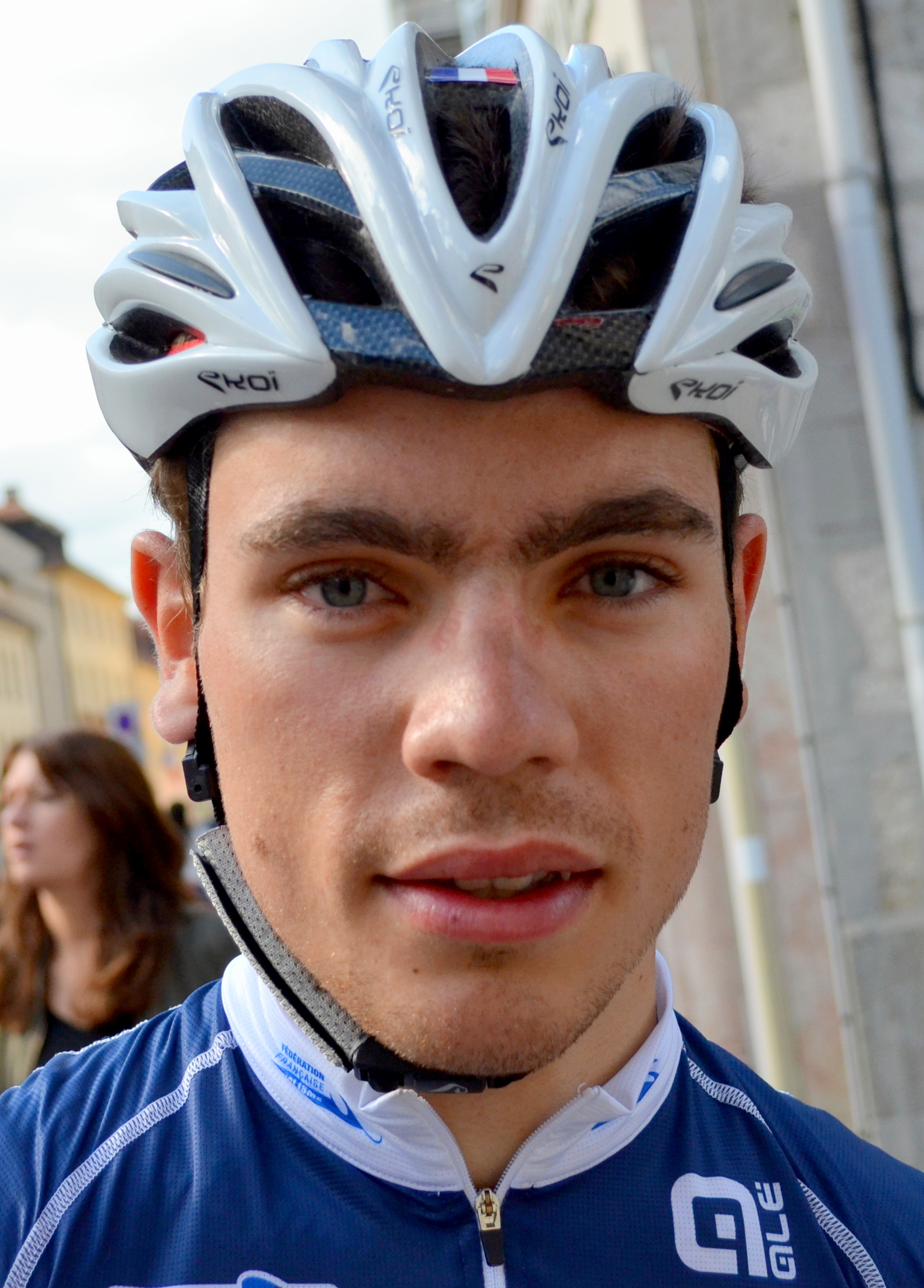
The French cyclist Jérémy Leveau wearing a bicycle helmet

Some British gamekeepers during the 18th and 19th centuries wore helmets made of straw bound together with cut bramble. Europeans in the tropics often wore the pith helmet, developed in the mid-19th century and made of pith or cork.

Military applications in the 19th–20th centuries saw a number of leather helmets, particularly among aviators and tank crews in the early 20th century. In the early days of the automobile, some motorists also adopted this style of headgear, and early football helmets were also made of leather. In World War II, American, Soviet, German, Italian and French flight crews wore leather helmets, the German pilots disguising theirs under a beret before disposing of both and switching to cloth caps. The era of the First and Second World Wars also saw a resurgence of metal military helmets, most notably the Brodie helmet and the Stahlhelm.

Modern helmets have a much wider range of applications, including helmets adapted to the specific needs of many athletic pursuits and work environments, and these helmets very often incorporate plastics and other synthetic materials for their light weight and shock absorption capabilities. Some types of synthetic fibers used to make helmets in the 21st century include aramid fibers, such as Kevlar and Twaron. Race car helmets include a head and neck support system that keeps the helmet (and head) attached to the body in severe collisions.

== Helmet types ==
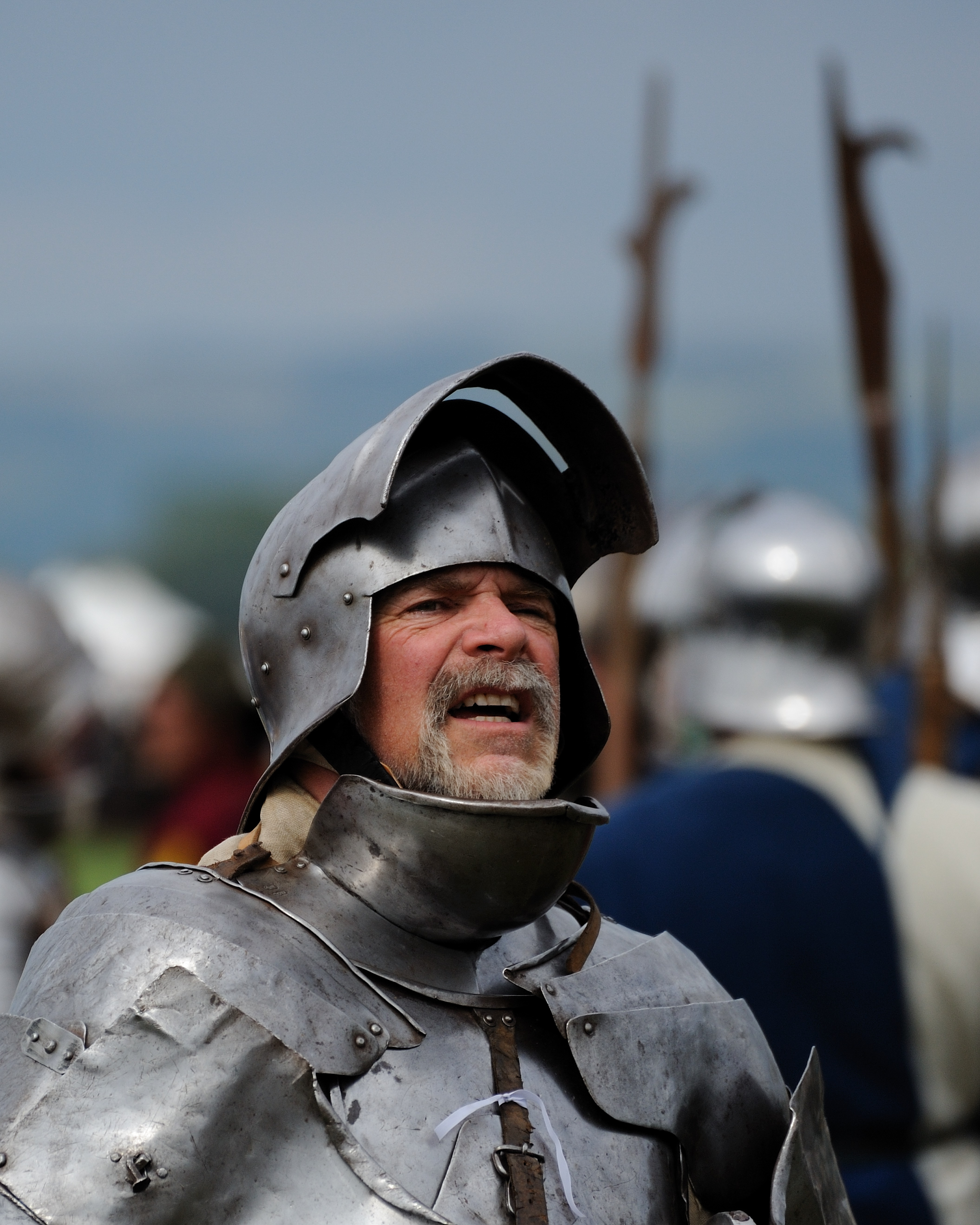
A medieval reenactor wearing a sallet

Helmets of many different types have developed over time. Most early helmets had military uses, though some may have had more ceremonial than combat applications.

Two important helmet types to develop in antiquity were the Corinthian helmet and the Roman galea.

During the Middle Ages, many different military helmets and some ceremonial helmets were developed, almost all being metal. Some of the more important medieval developments included the great helm, the bascinet, the frog-mouth helm, and the armet.

The great seal of Owain Glyndŵr (c. 1359 – c. 1415) depicts the prince of Wales and his stallion wearing full armour, they both wear protective headgear with Owain's gold dragon mounted on top. This would have been impractical in battle, so therefore these would have been ceremonial.

In the 19th century, more materials were incorporated, namely leather, felt and pith. The pith helmet and the leather pickelhaube were important 19th century developments. The greatest expansion in the variety of forms and composition of helmets, however, took place in the 20th century, with the development of highly specialized helmets for a multitude of athletic and professional applications, as well as the advent of modern plastics. During World War I, the French army developed the Adrian helmet, the British developed the Brodie helmet, and the Germans produced the Stahlhelm.

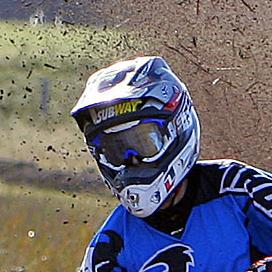
A motocross helmet with goggles and elongated chin bar

The development of hard hats for workplace safety may have been inspired by the helmets of WWI, and they have become a standard type of safety equipment on many construction job sites and industrial locations.

Flight helmets were also developed throughout the 20th century. A multitude of athletic helmets, including football helmets, batting helmets, hockey helmets, cricket helmets, bicycle helmets, ski helmets, motorcycle helmets and racing helmets, were also developed in the 20th century.

Helmets since the mid-20th century have often incorporated lightweight plastics and other synthetic materials, and their use has become highly specialized. Some important recent developments include the French SPECTRA helmet, Spanish MARTE helmet or the American PASGT (commonly called "Kevlar" by U.S. troops) and Advanced Combat Helmet, or ACH.

In the early 21st century, the Catalan sport/tradition of castells saw the introduction of helmets for the children who make up the pom de dalt or top three levels of a castell. The helmets were specially designed with a soft outer surface, to protect the child while mitigating the risk that the helmet could injure others during a fall.

== Heraldry ==
As the coat of arms was originally designed to distinguish noble combatants on the battlefield or in a tournament, even while covered in armour, it is not surprising that heraldic elements constantly incorporated the shield and the helmet, these often being the most visible parts of a knight's military equipment.

The practice of indicating peerage through the display of barred or grilled helmets first appeared around 1587-1615, and the heraldic convention of displaying helmets of rank in the United Kingdom, which came into vogue around Stuart times, is as follows:

- Sovereign: a gold barred-face (tournament) helm placed affronté
- Peer's helmet: silver barred-face (tournament) helm placed in profile
- Knight's or baronet's helmet: steel helm (earlier jousting helm, later close helm) placed affronté with visor open
- Esquire's helmet: steel helm placed in profile with visor closed

Earlier rolls of arms reveal, however, that early heraldic helmets were depicted in a manner faithful to the styles in actual military or tournament use at the time.

== Gallery ==
Combat helmets

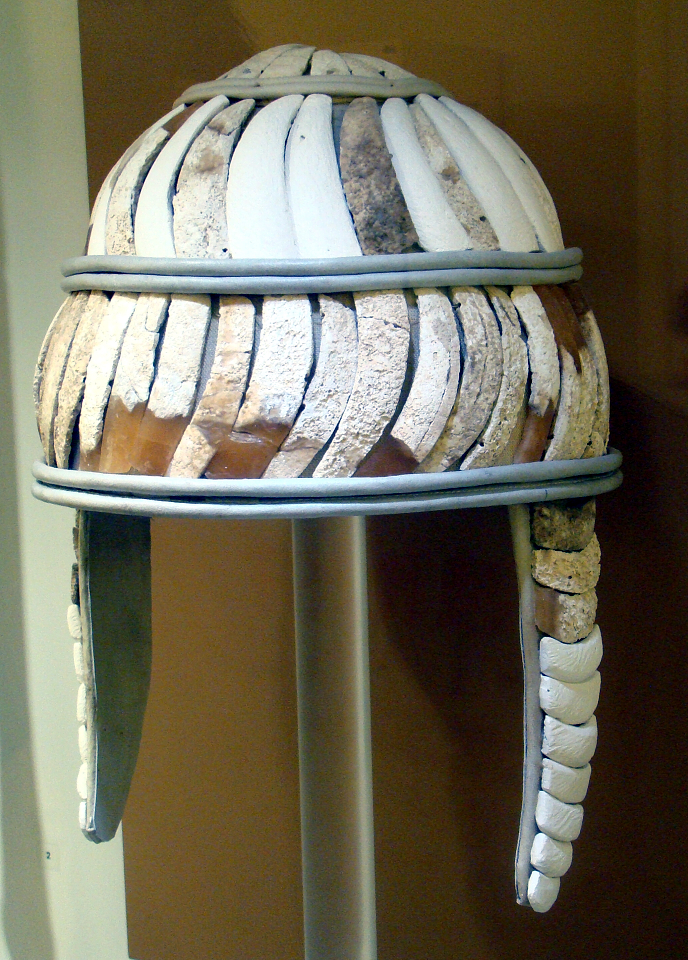
Boar tusk Minoan helmet, 1600–1500 BCE

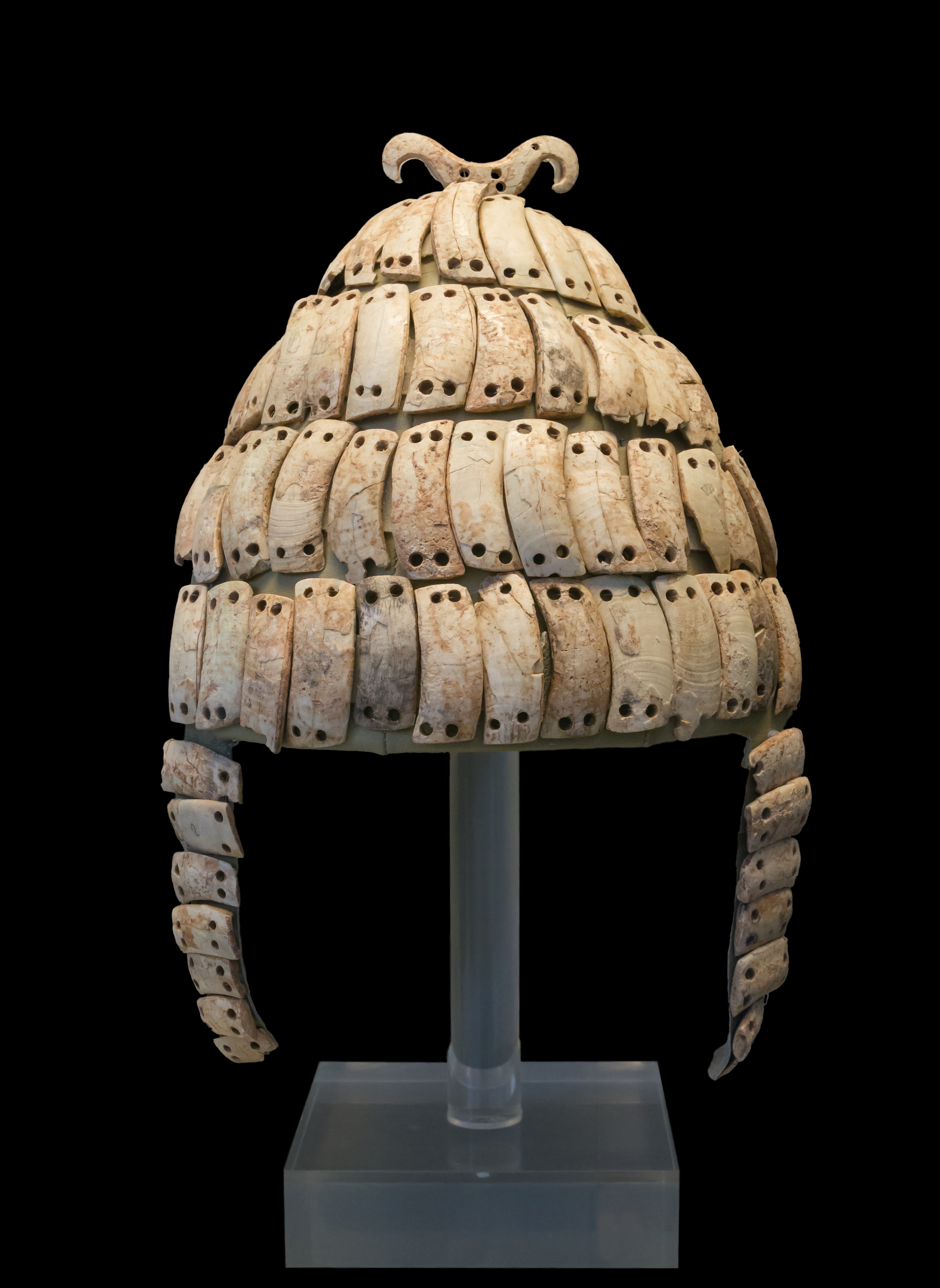
Boar tusk Mycenaean helmet, 14th century BCE

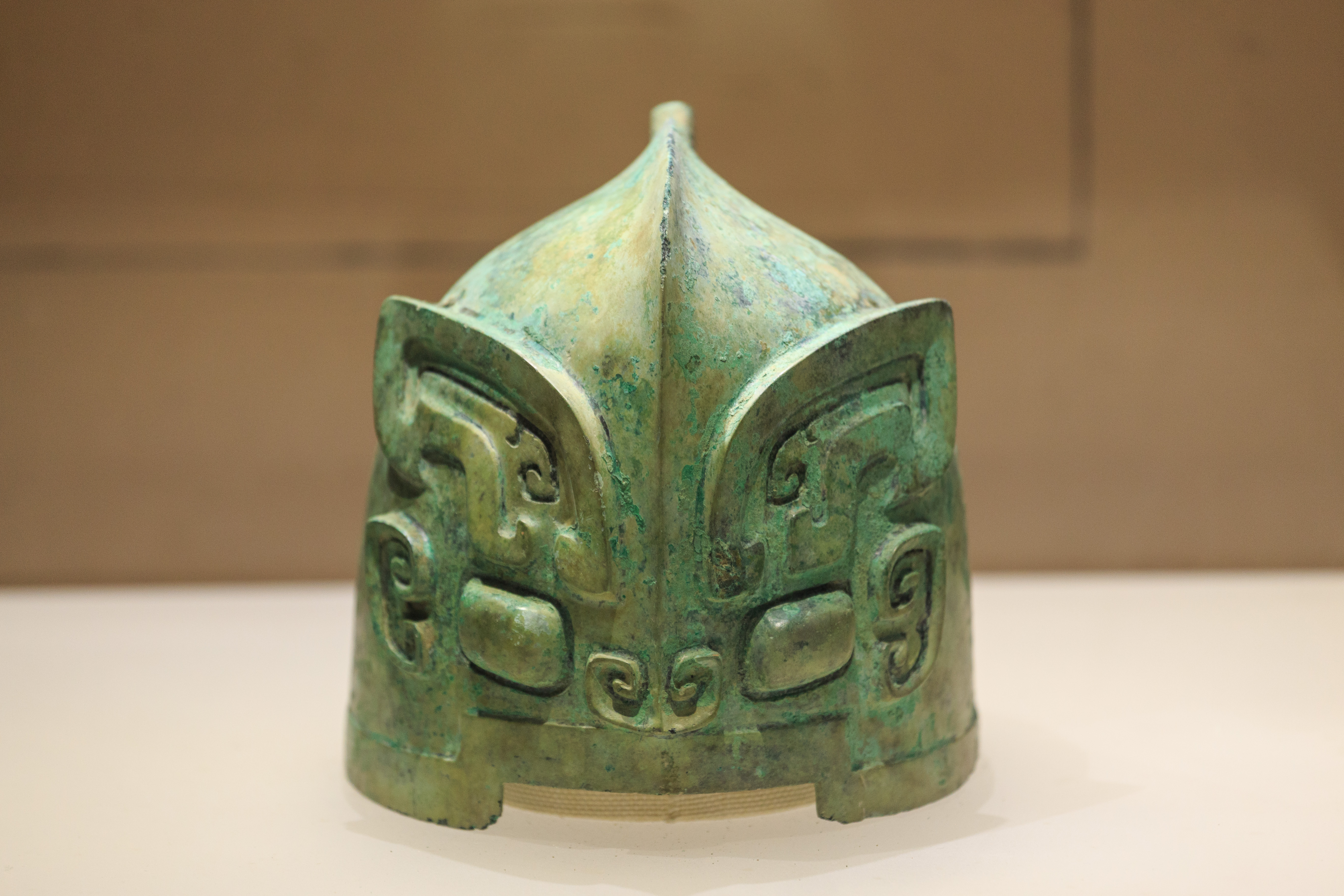
Helmet from the Shang dynasty in China, 13th century BCE

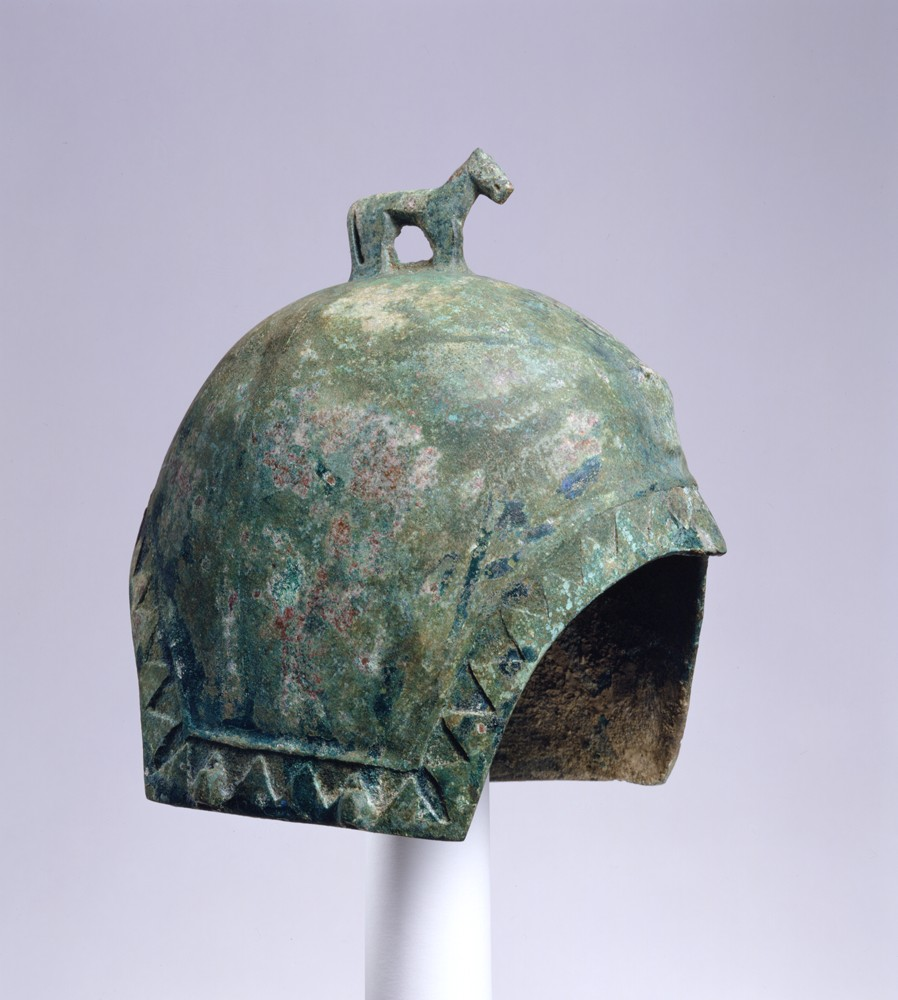
Helmet from the Shang dynasty in China, 7th century BCE

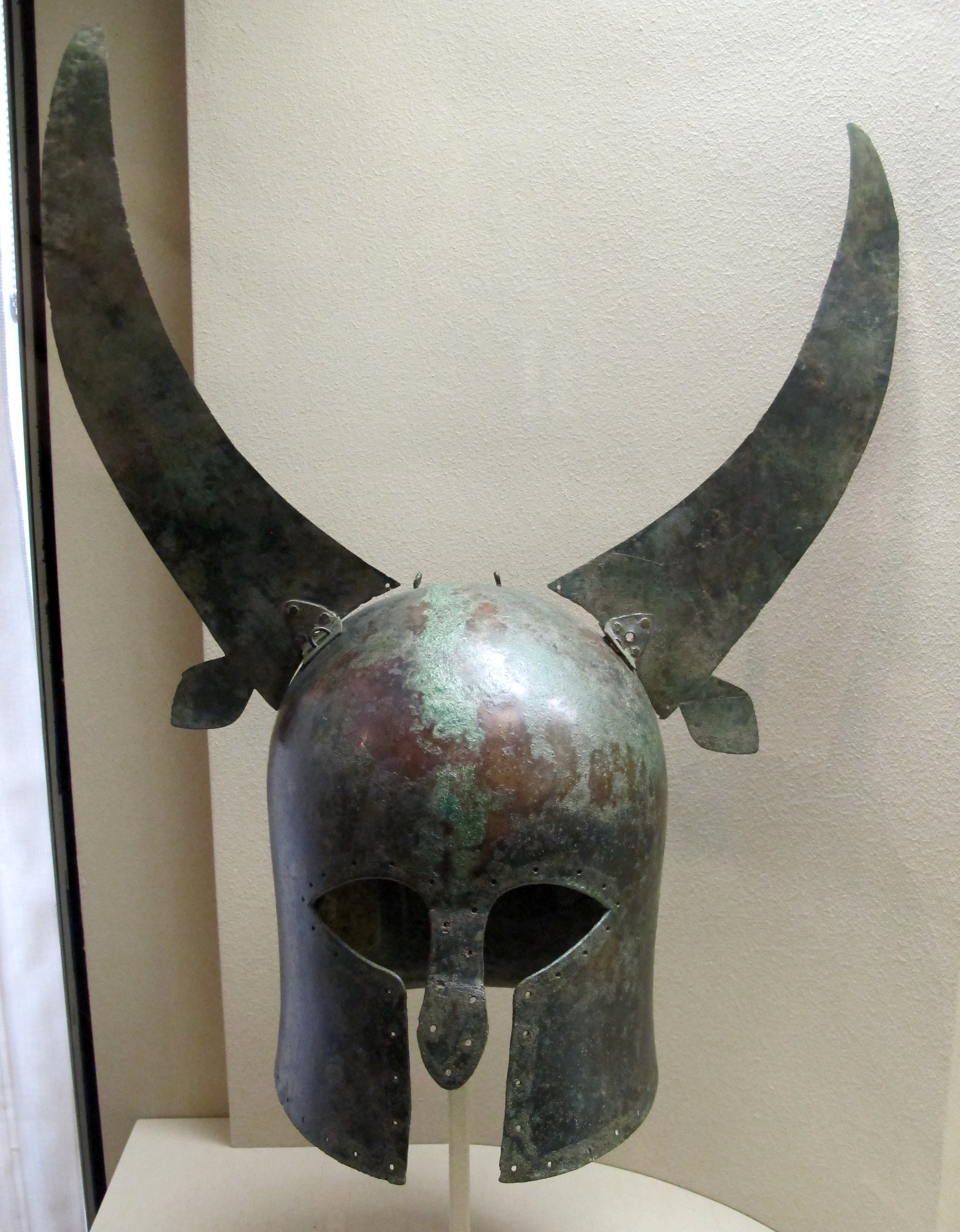
Corinthian helmet with detachable horns, circa 650 BCE

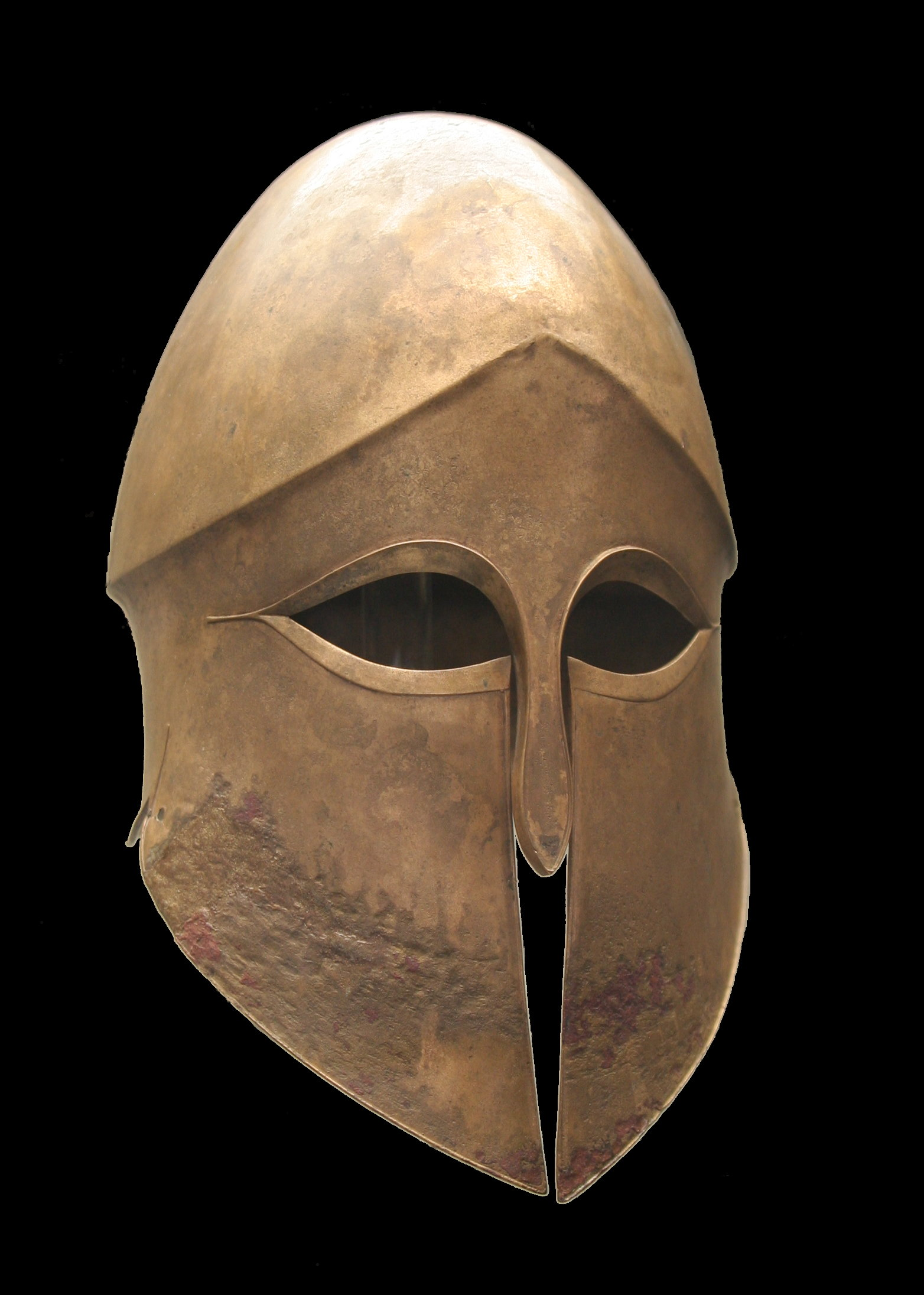
Corinthian helmet, 500 BCE

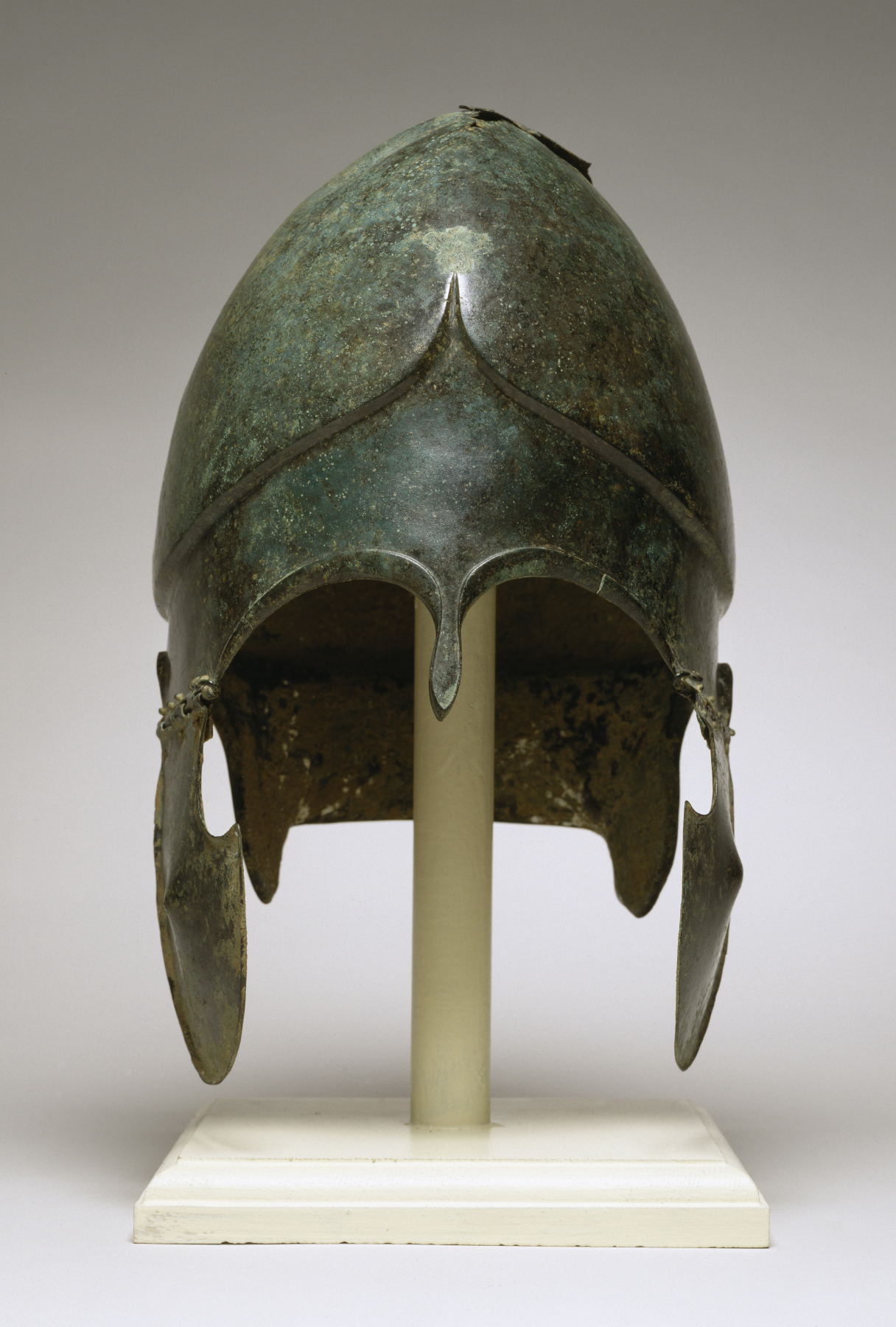
Greek Chalcidian helmet, 500 BCE

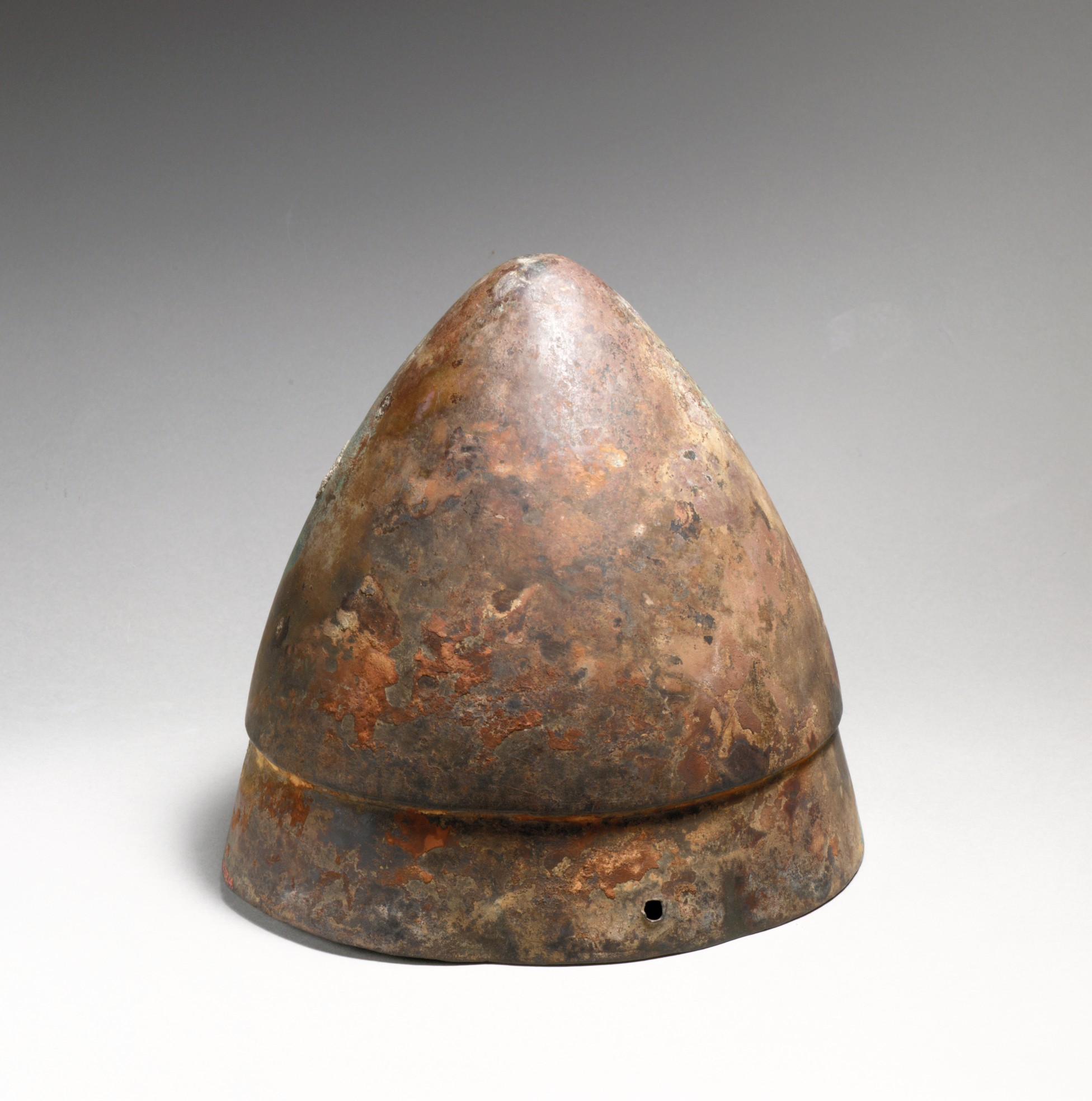
Greek pilos helmet, 450–425 BCE

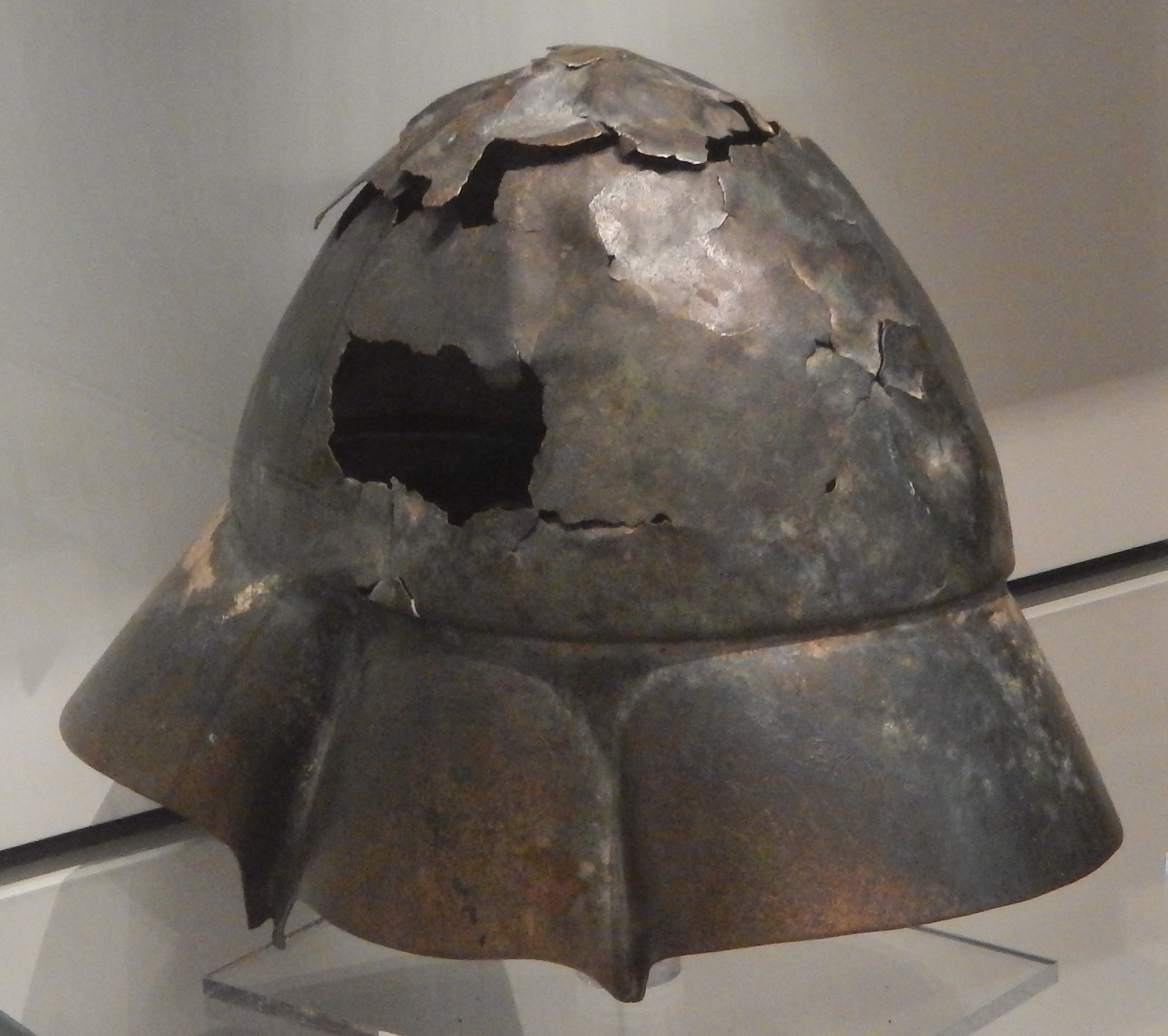
Boeotian helmet, 4th century BCE

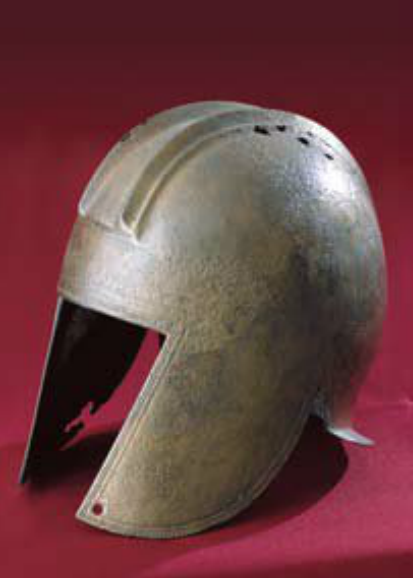
Greek Illyrian type helmet, 4th century BCE

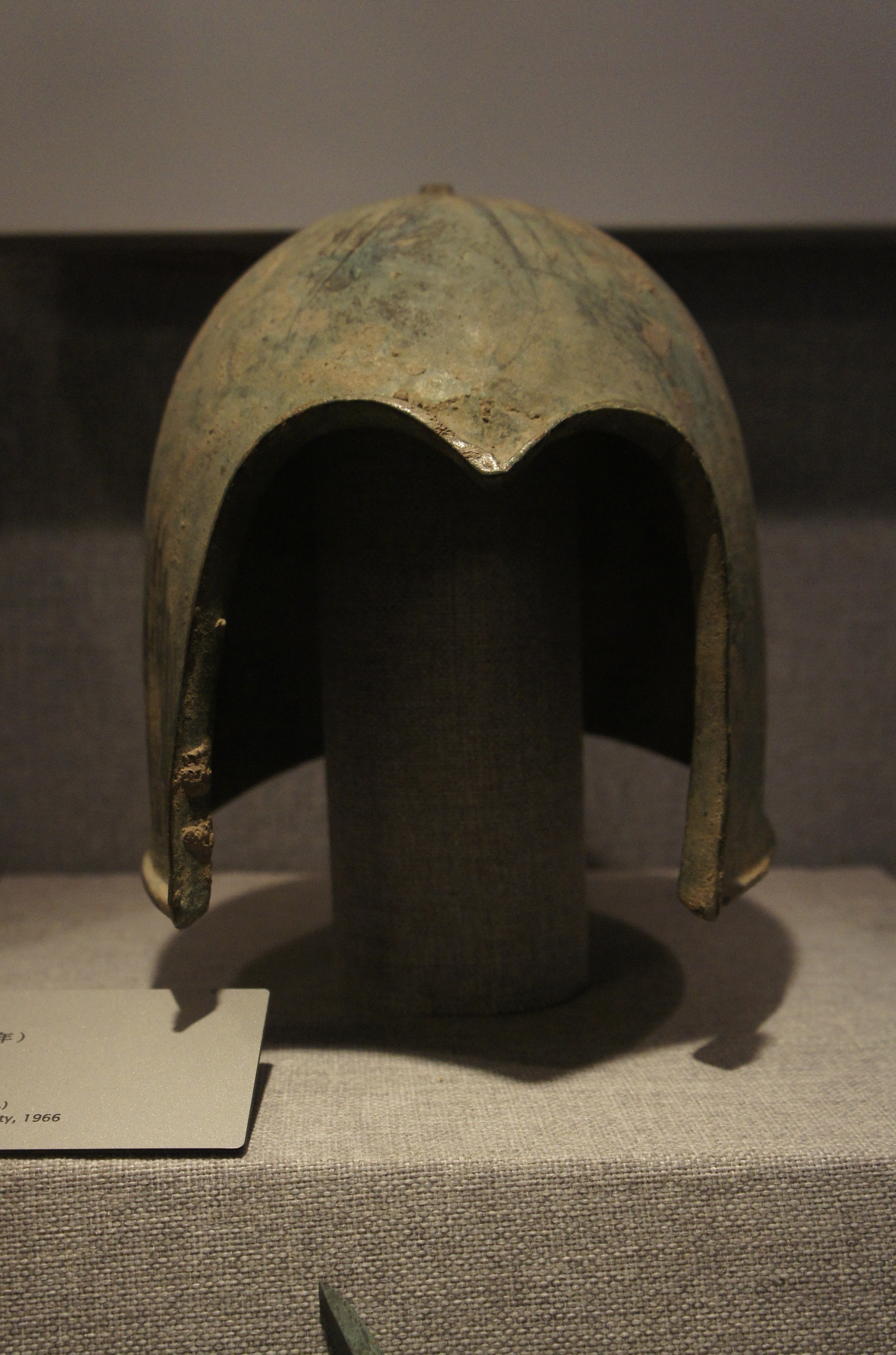
Helmets from the Warring States period in Eastern Zhou dynasty, China, 403 BCE - 221 BCE

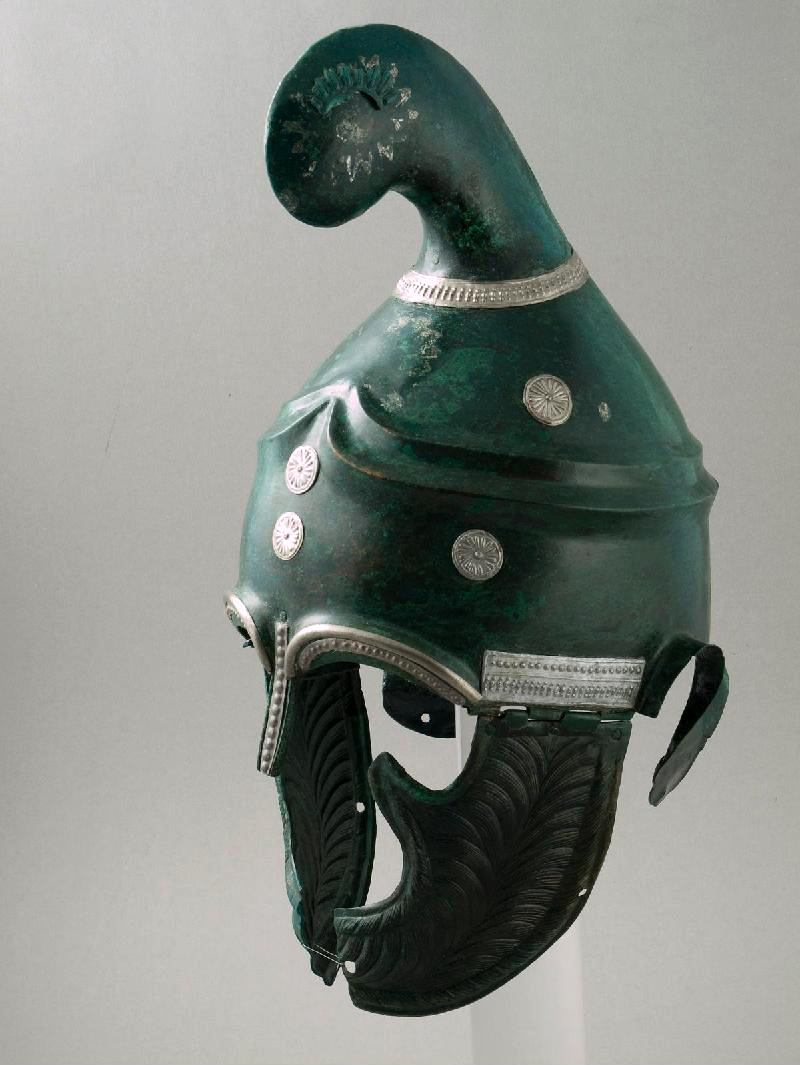
Thracian helmet, 4th century BCE

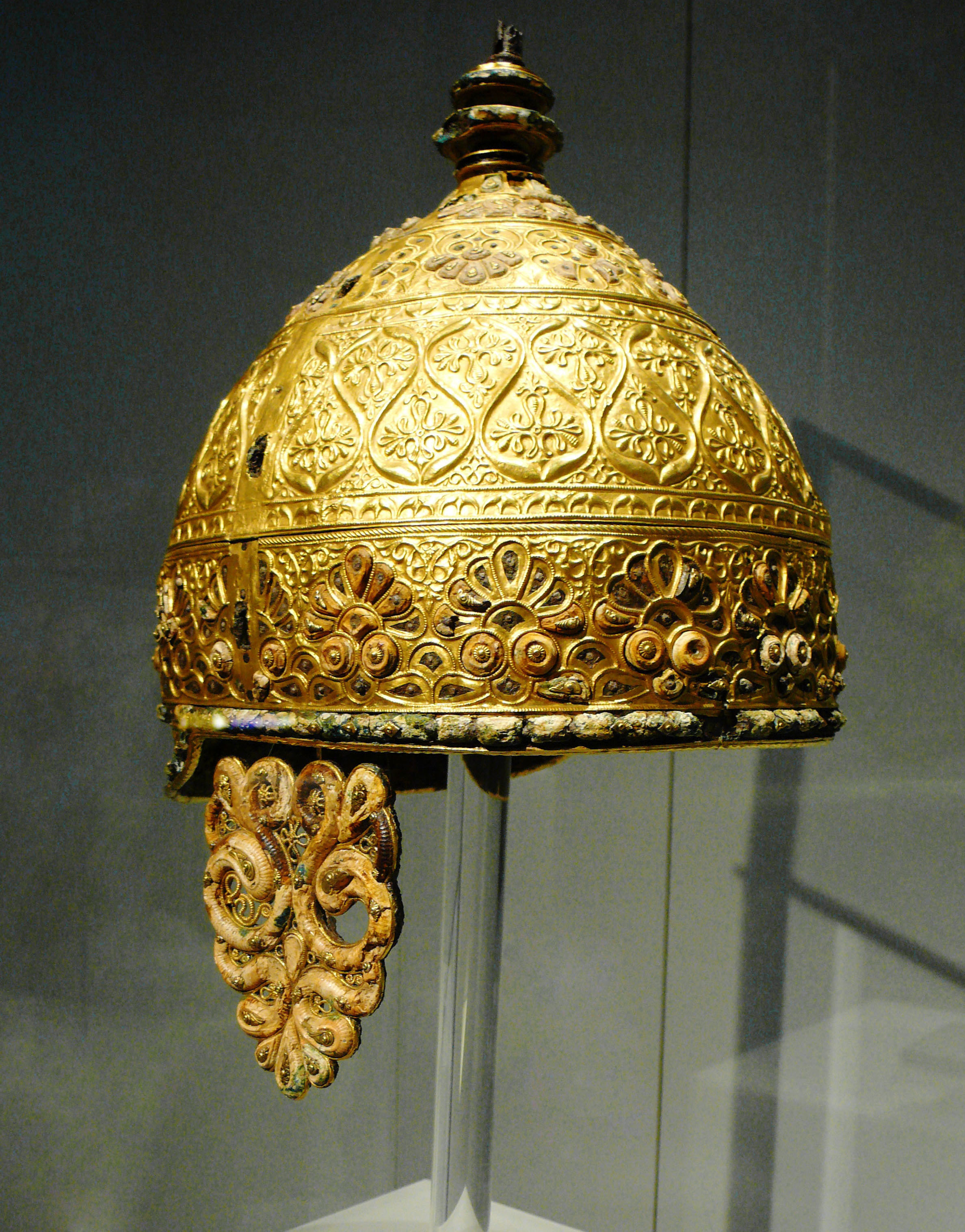
Celtic (Gallic) parade helmet, 350 BCE

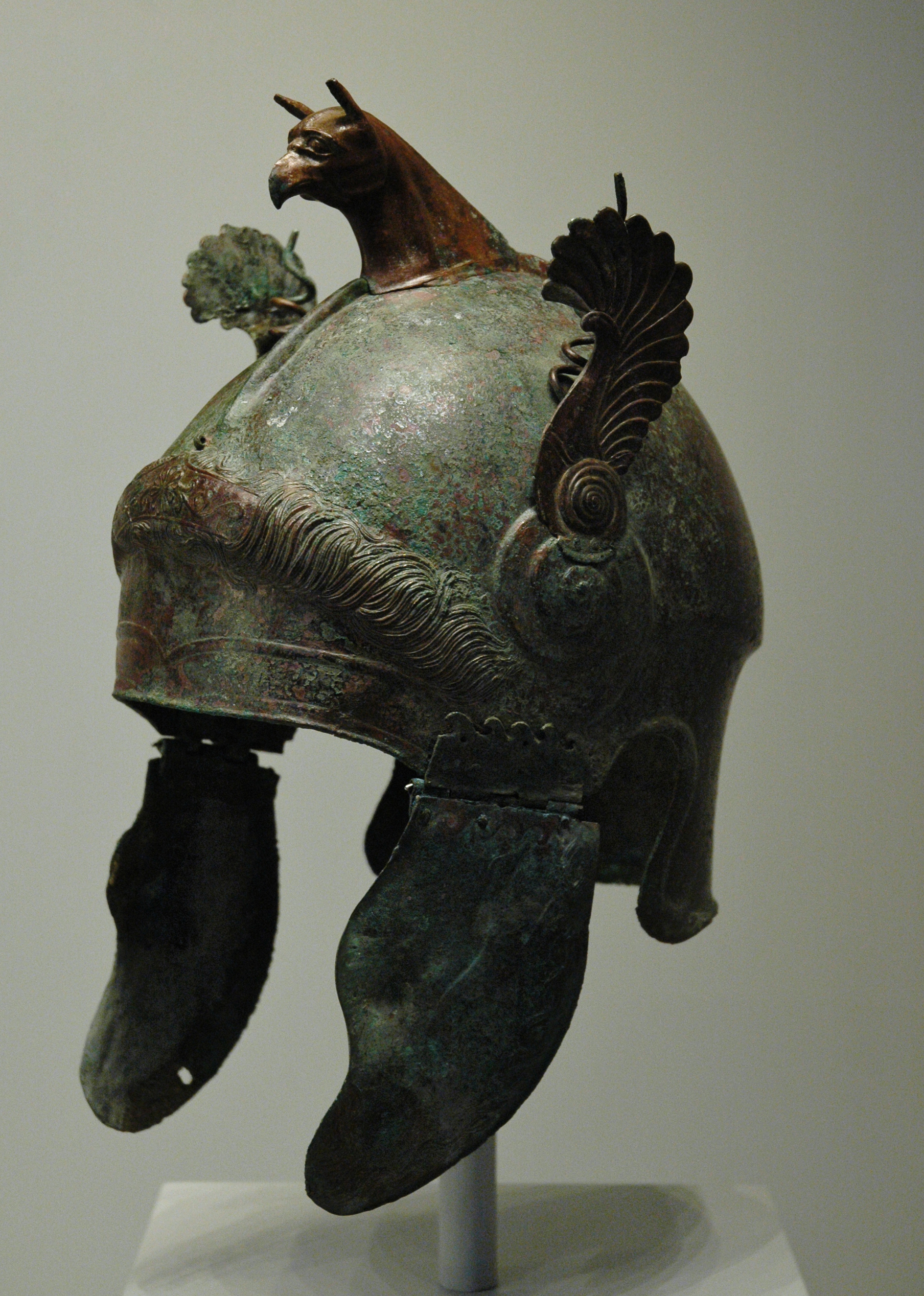
Attic helmet, 350 BCE to 300 BCE

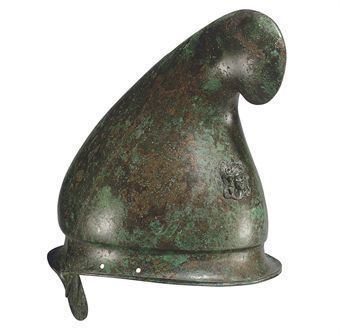
Greek bronze Phrygian helmet, 350 BCE to 300 BCE

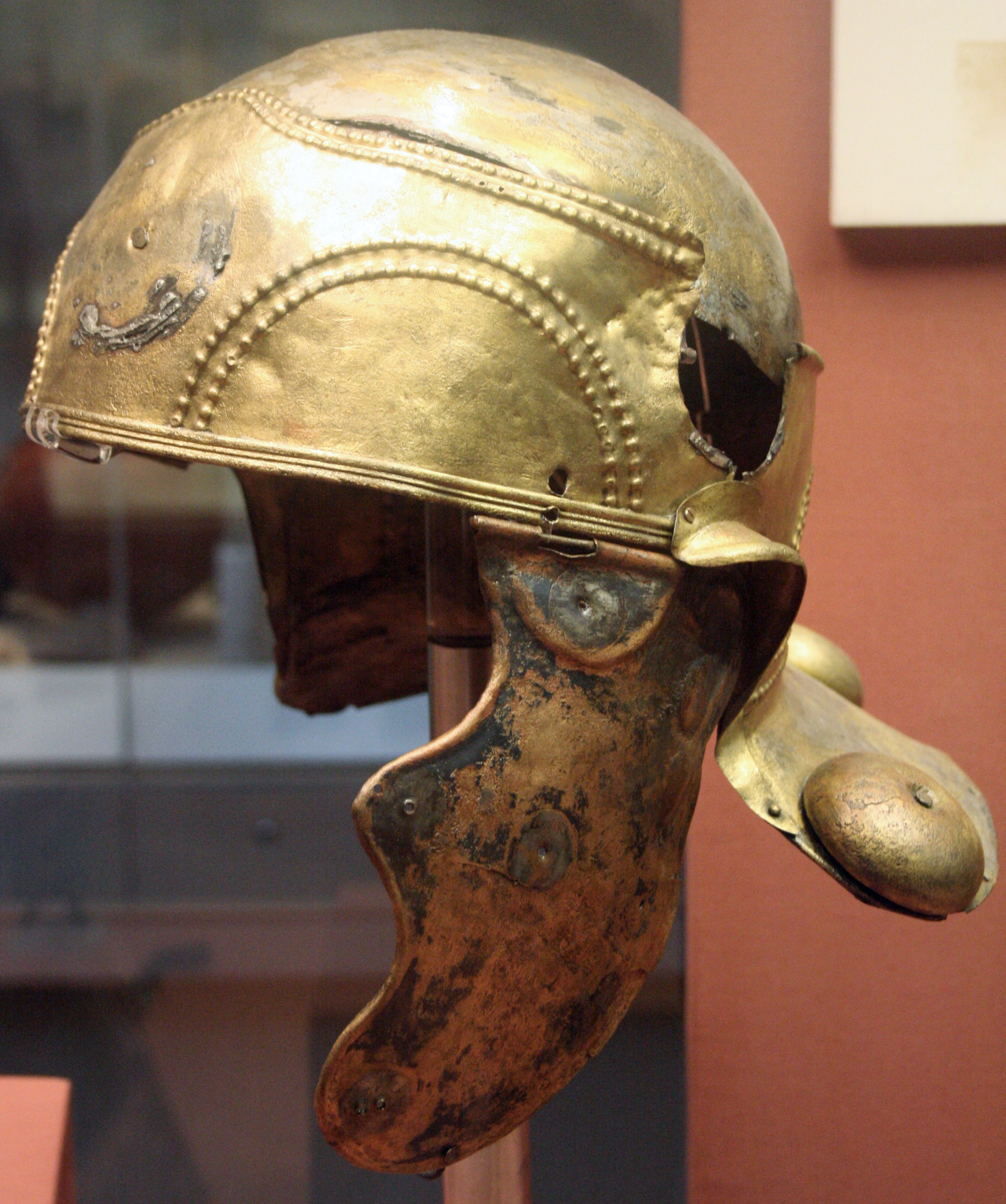
Roman cavalry helmet, 1st century CE

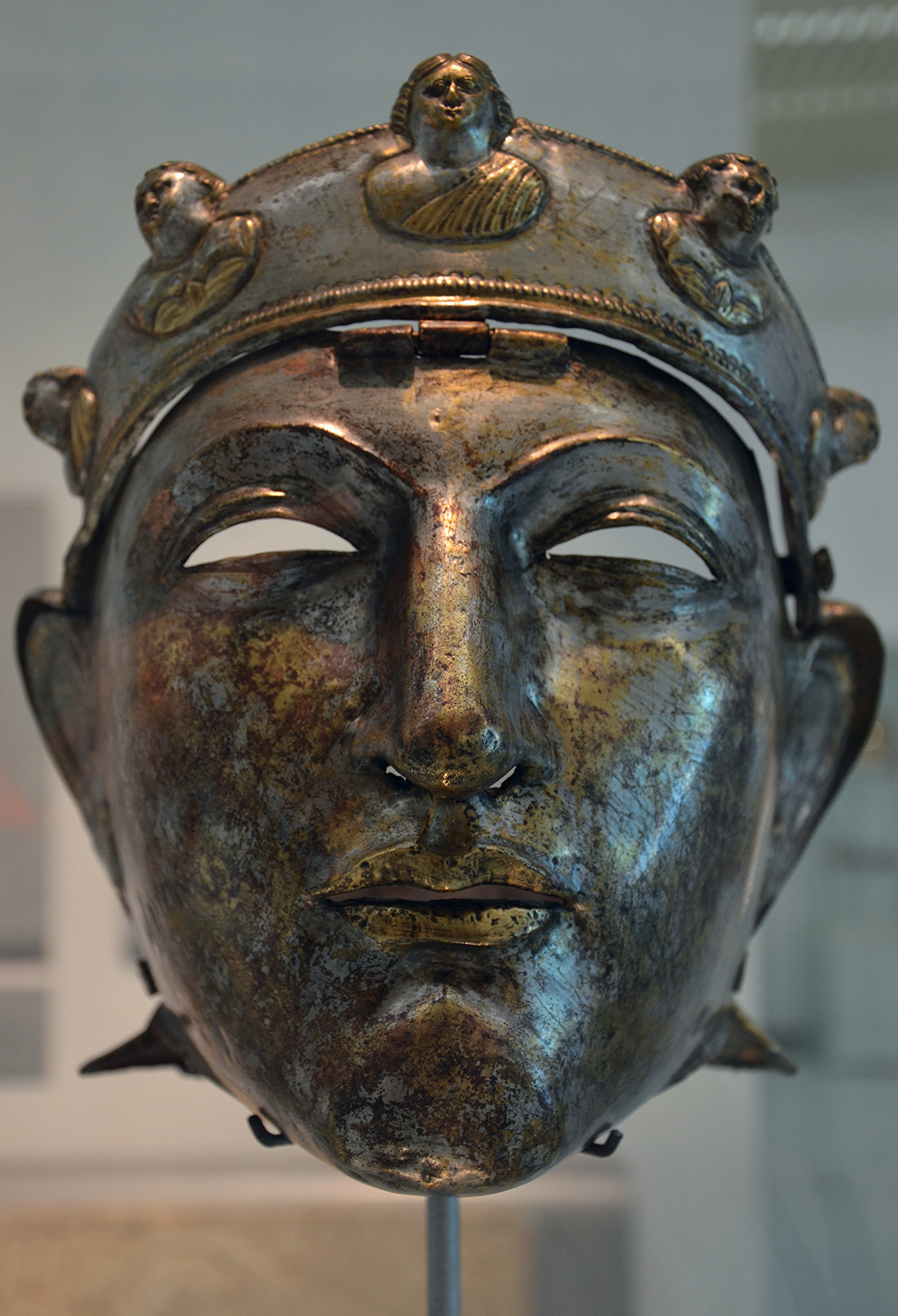
Roman cavalry helmet

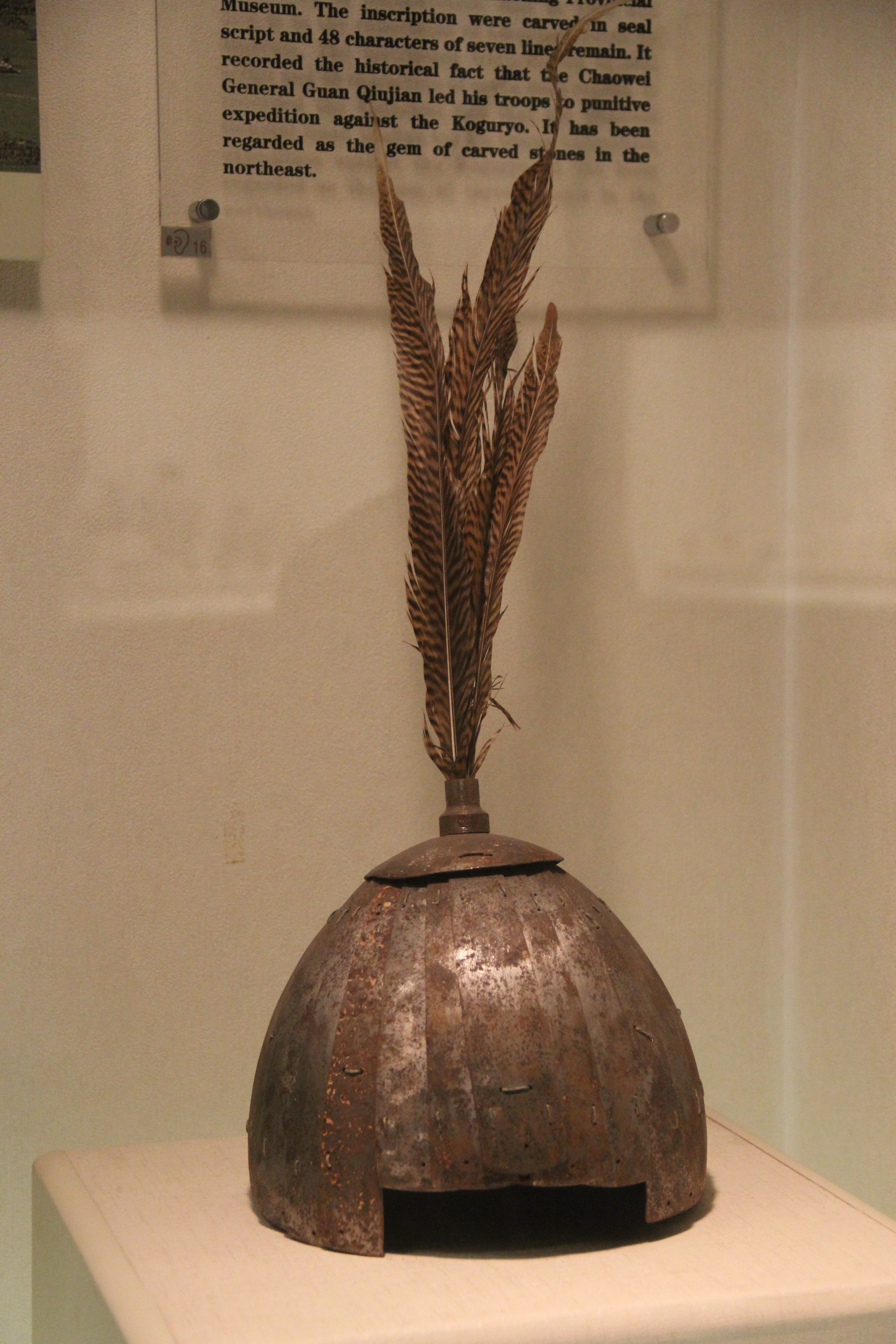
Helmets from Northern and Southern dynasties in China, 5th-6th century

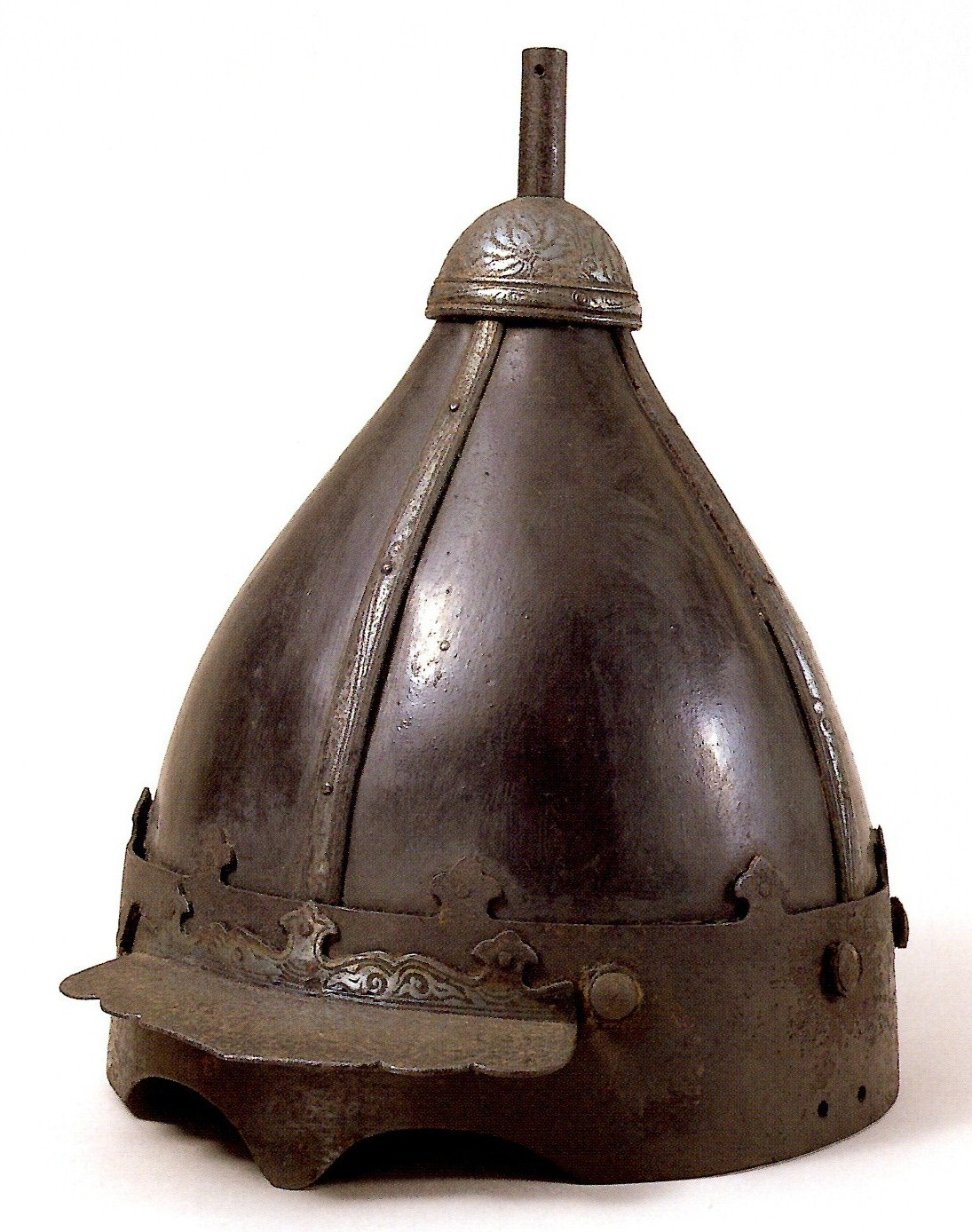
Black Mongolian helmet

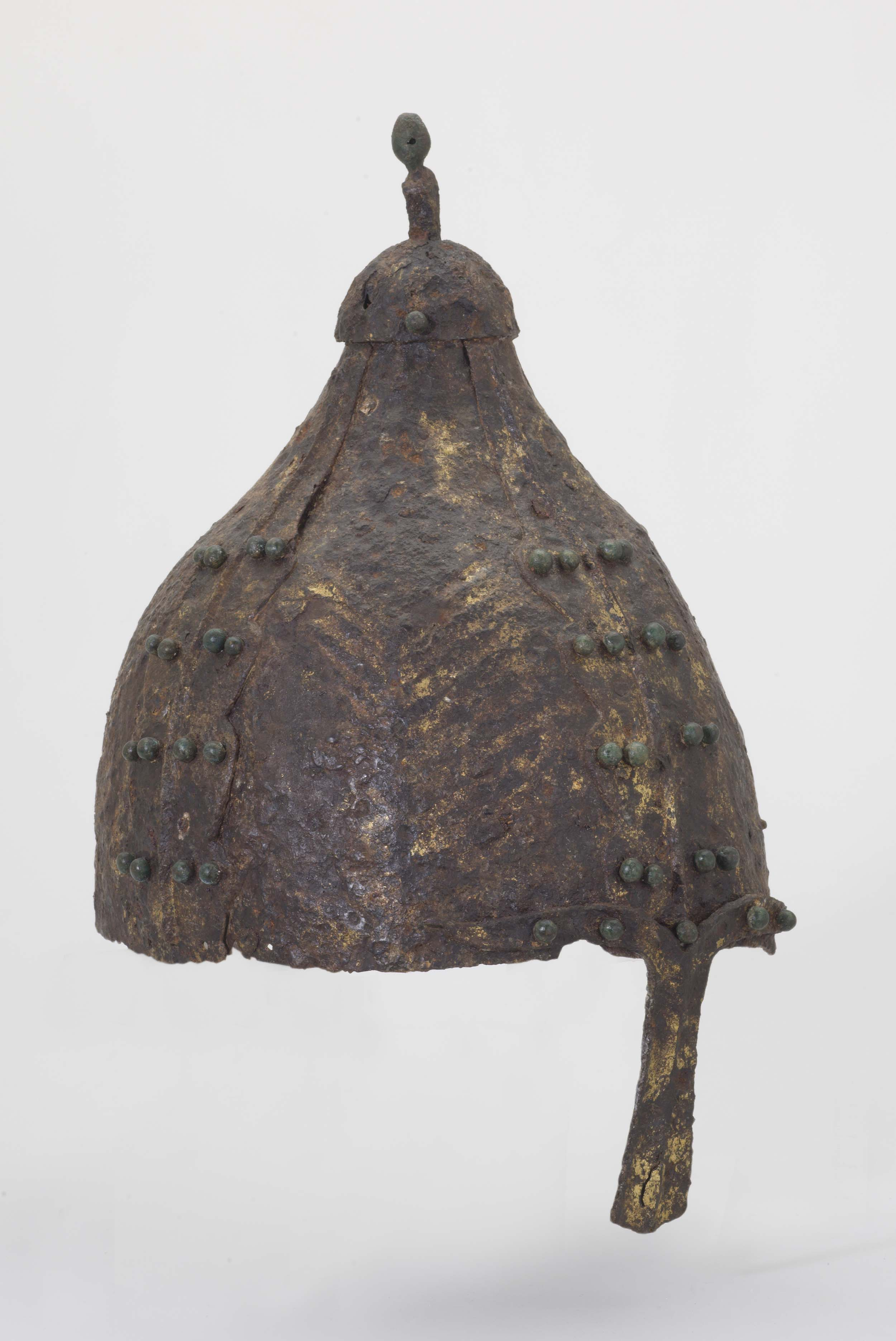
Iranian, 7th or 8th century CE Spangenhelm

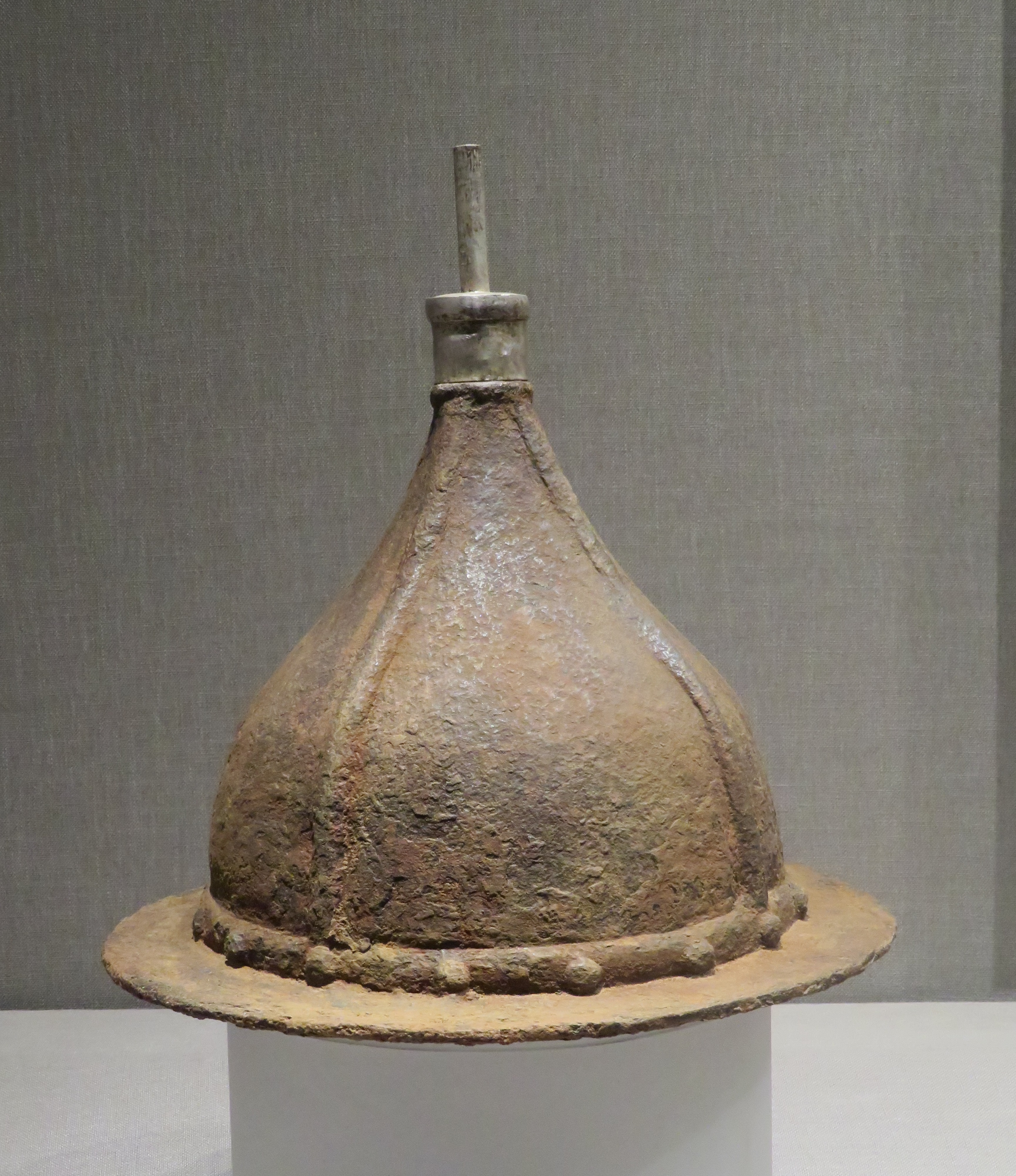
Helmet from the Yuan dynasty in China, 13th-14th century

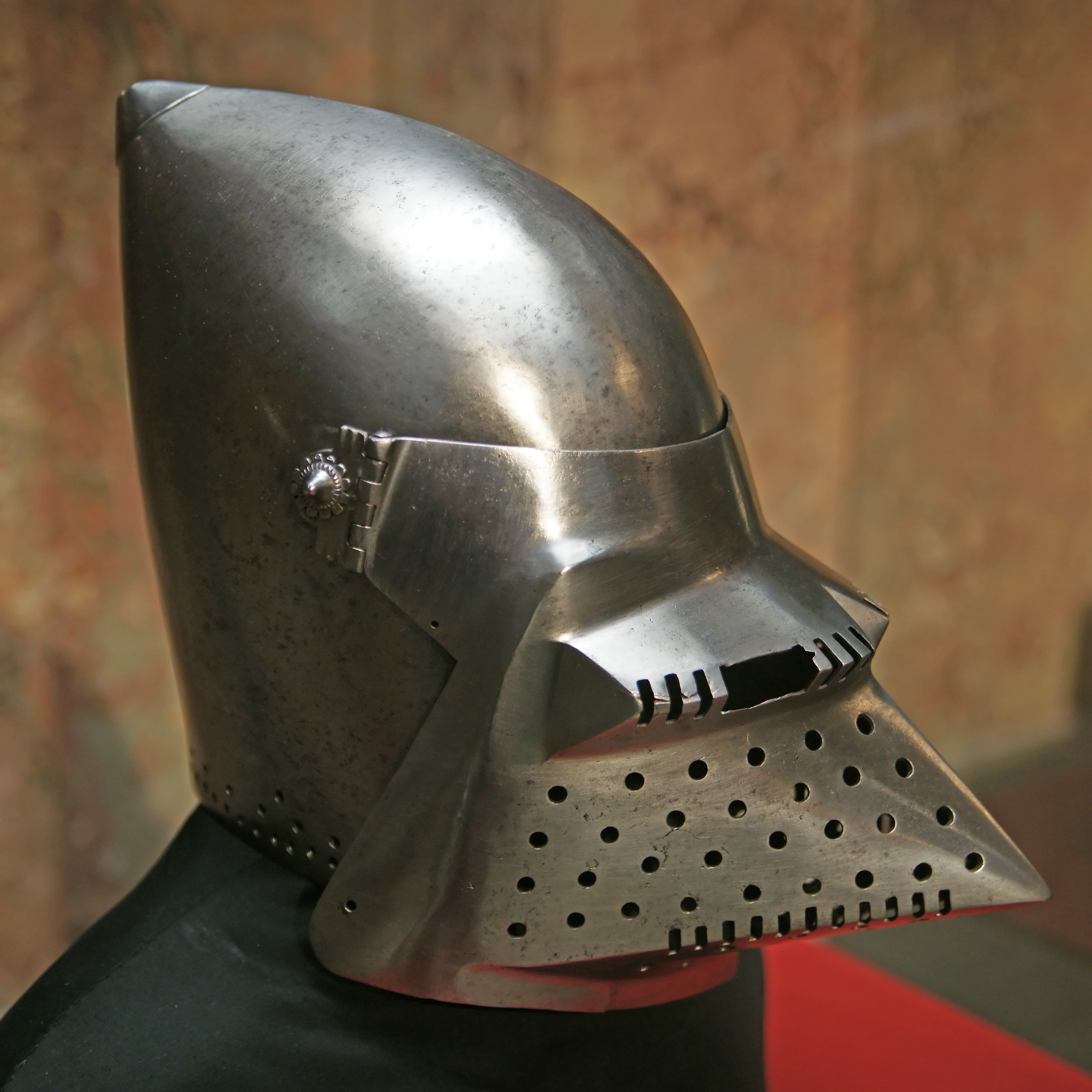
Early 15th century bascinet with hounskull visor

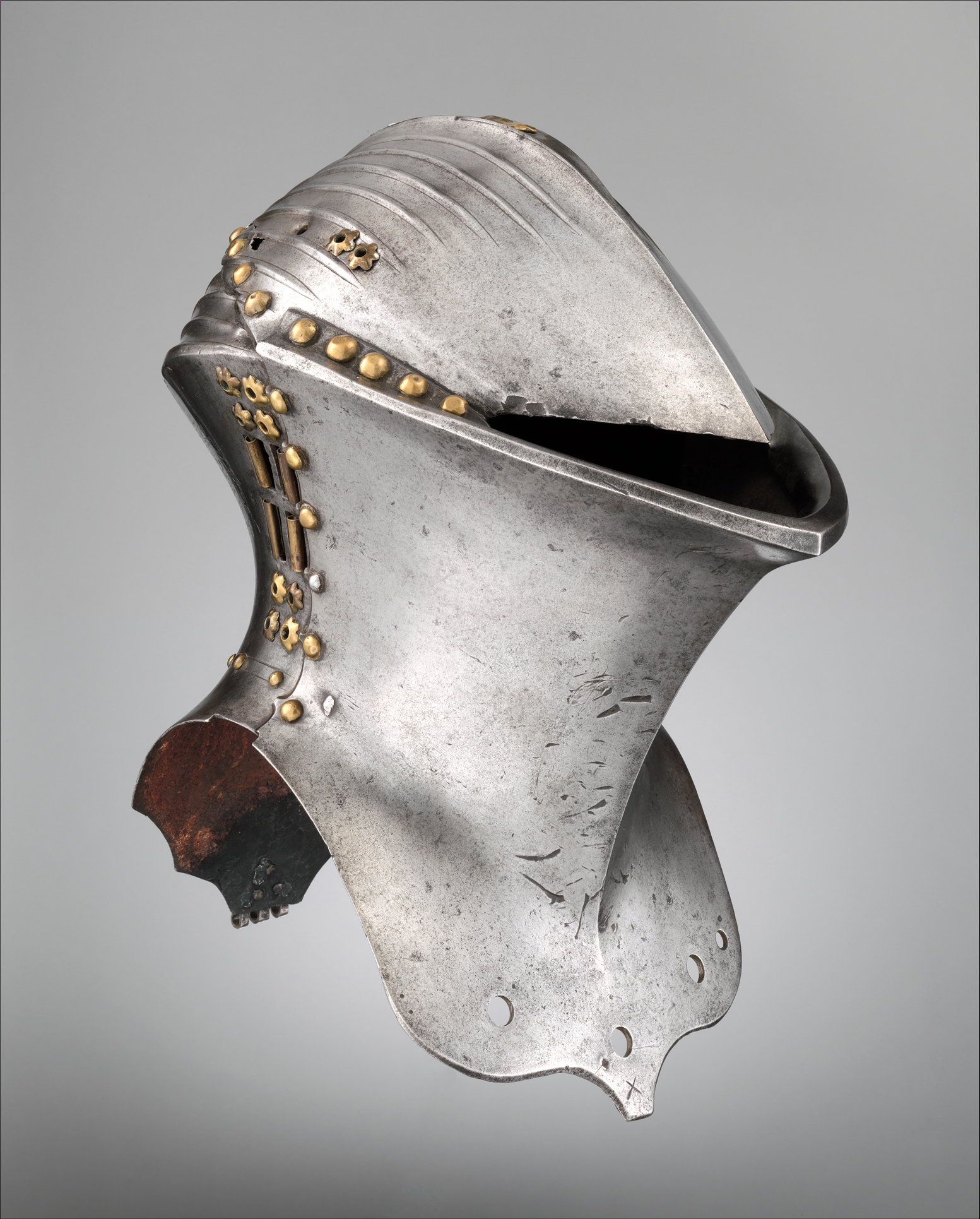
15th-century German frog-mouth helm used in jousting

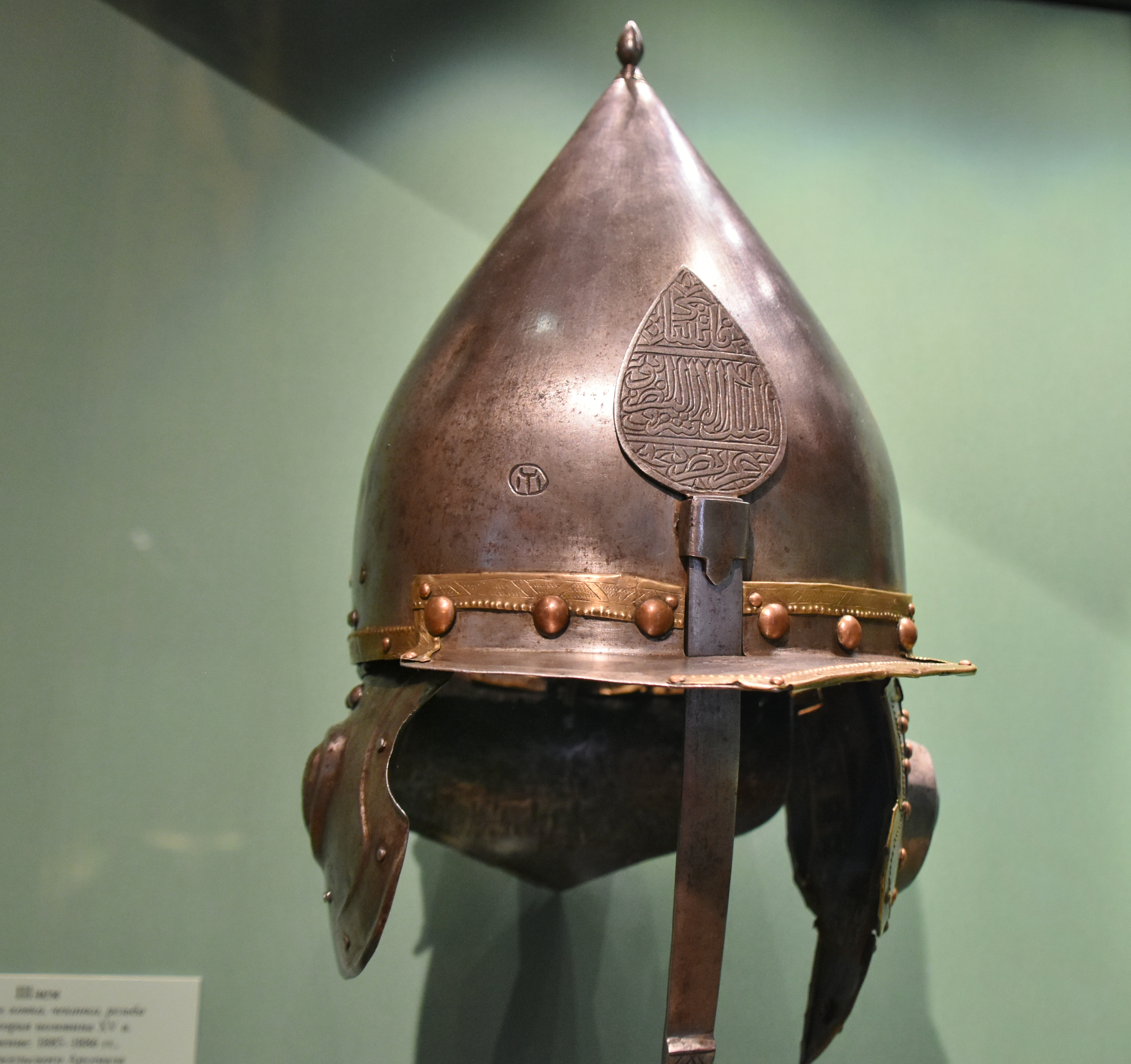
Ottoman zischagge helmet, mid-16th century

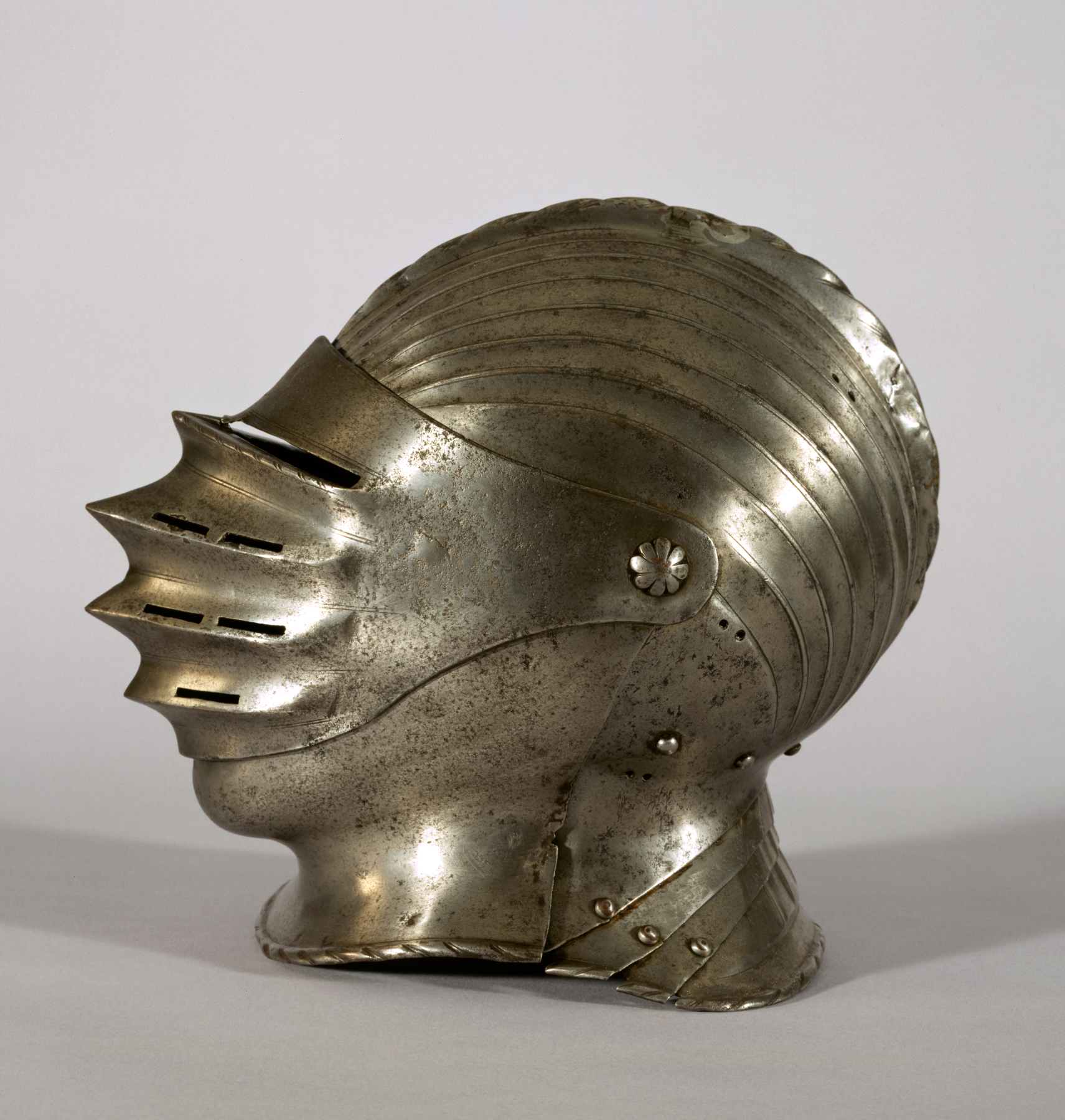
16th century Maximilian style close helmet

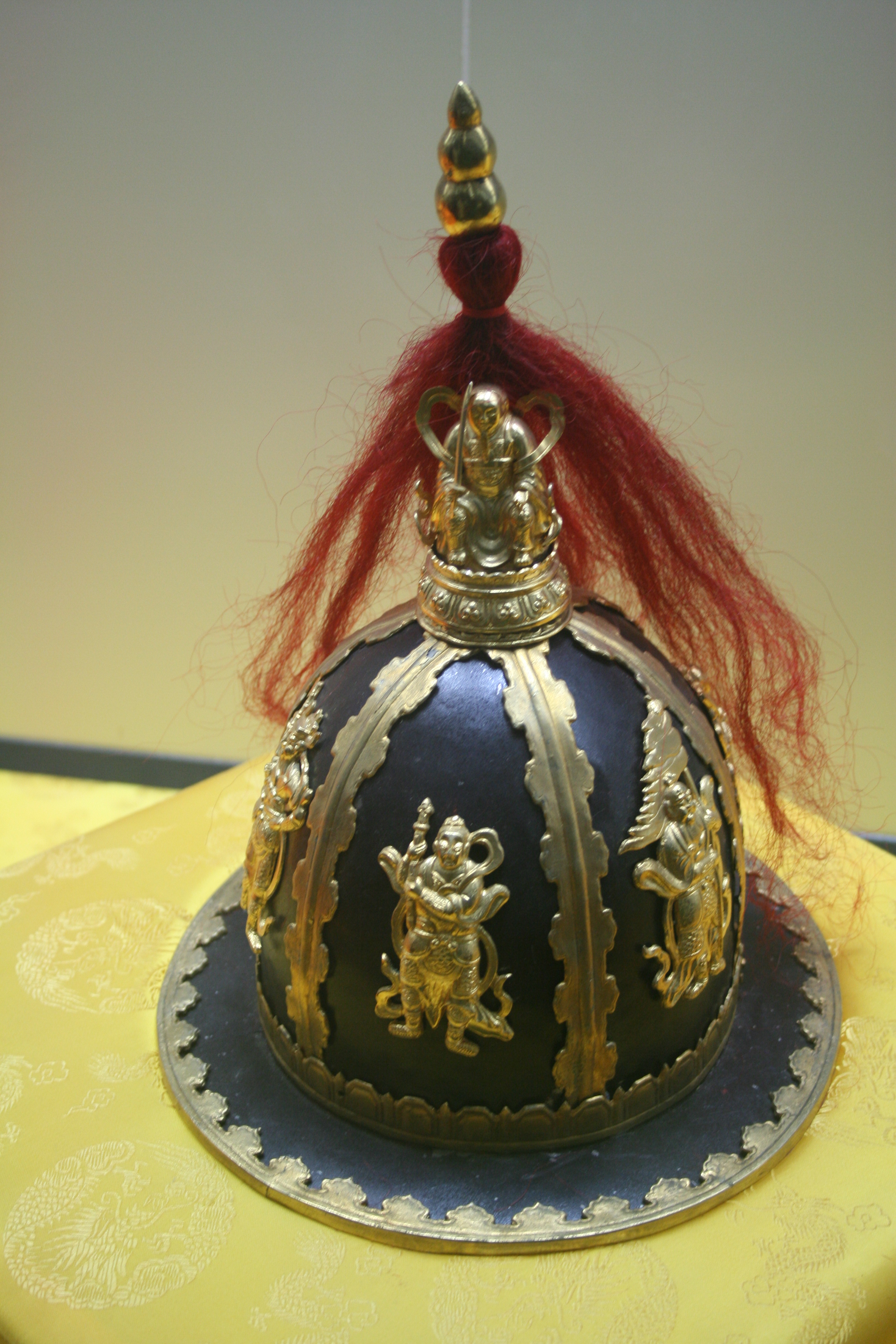
Helmet from the Ming dynasty in China, 16th-17th century

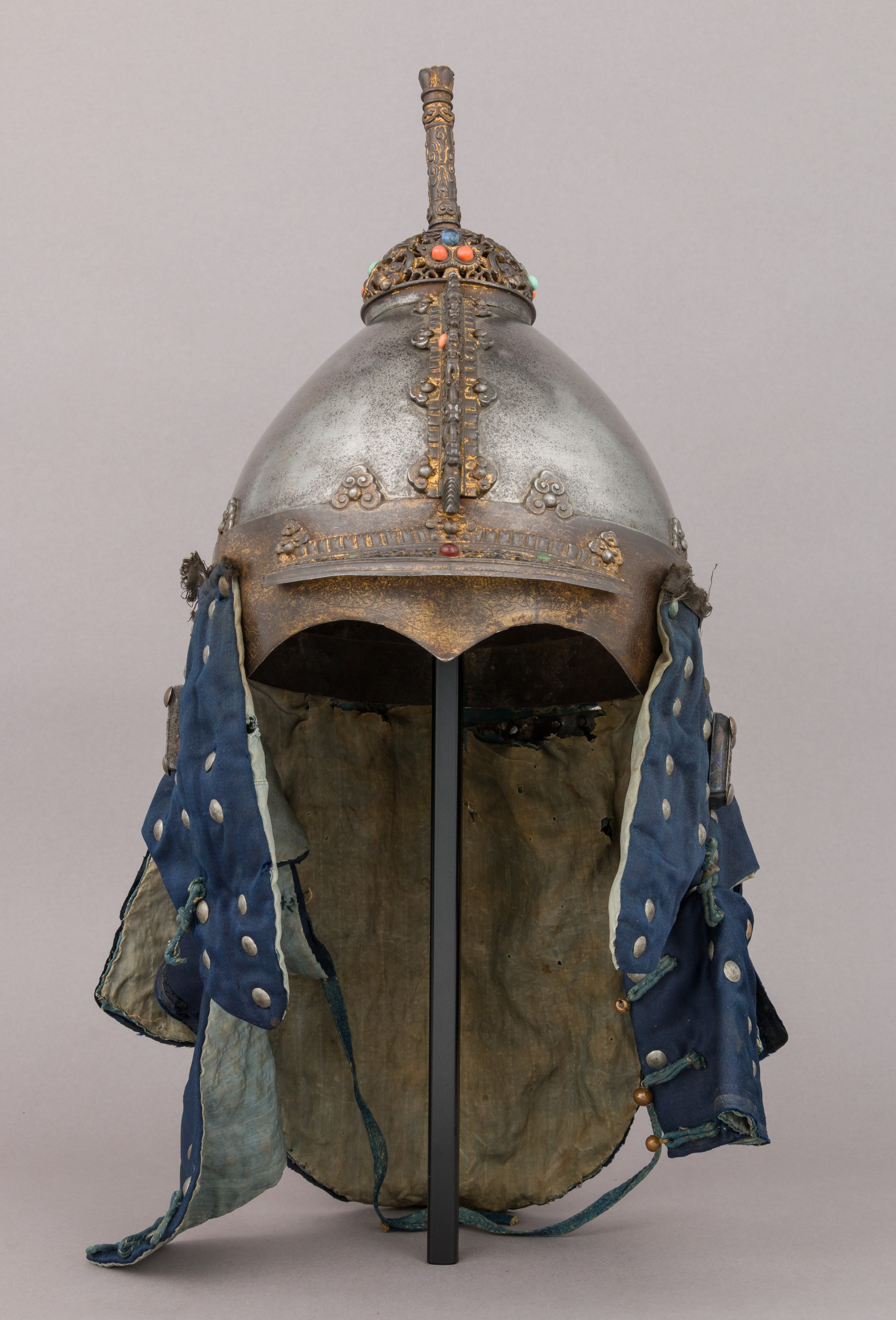
Helmet from the Qing dynasty in China, 18th century

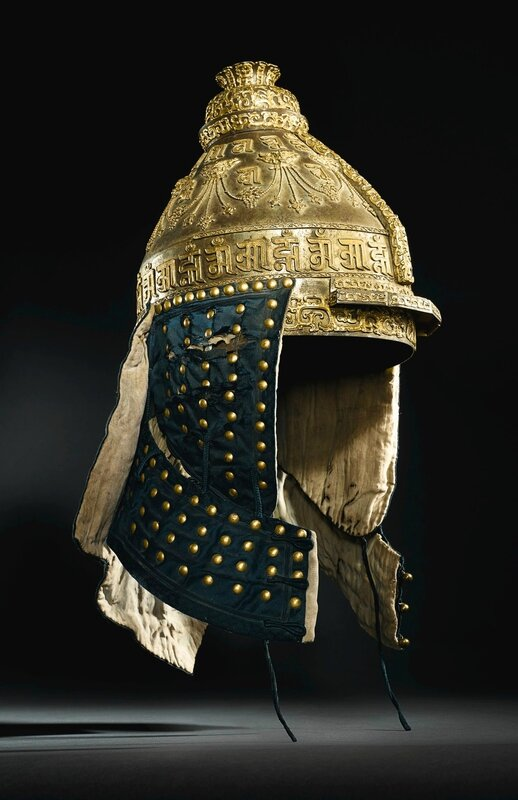
Chinese helmet, 18th century

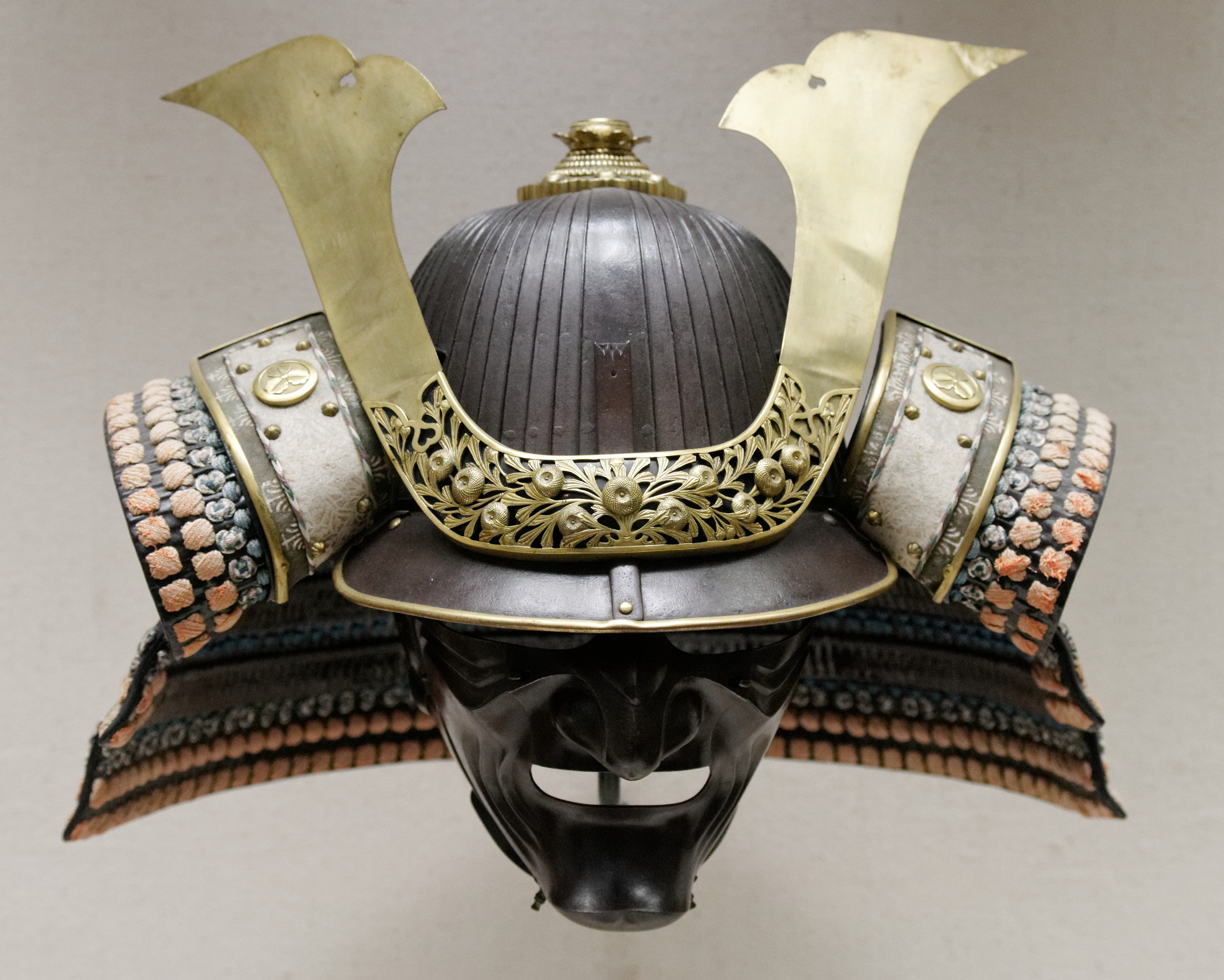
19th-century Japanese kabuto

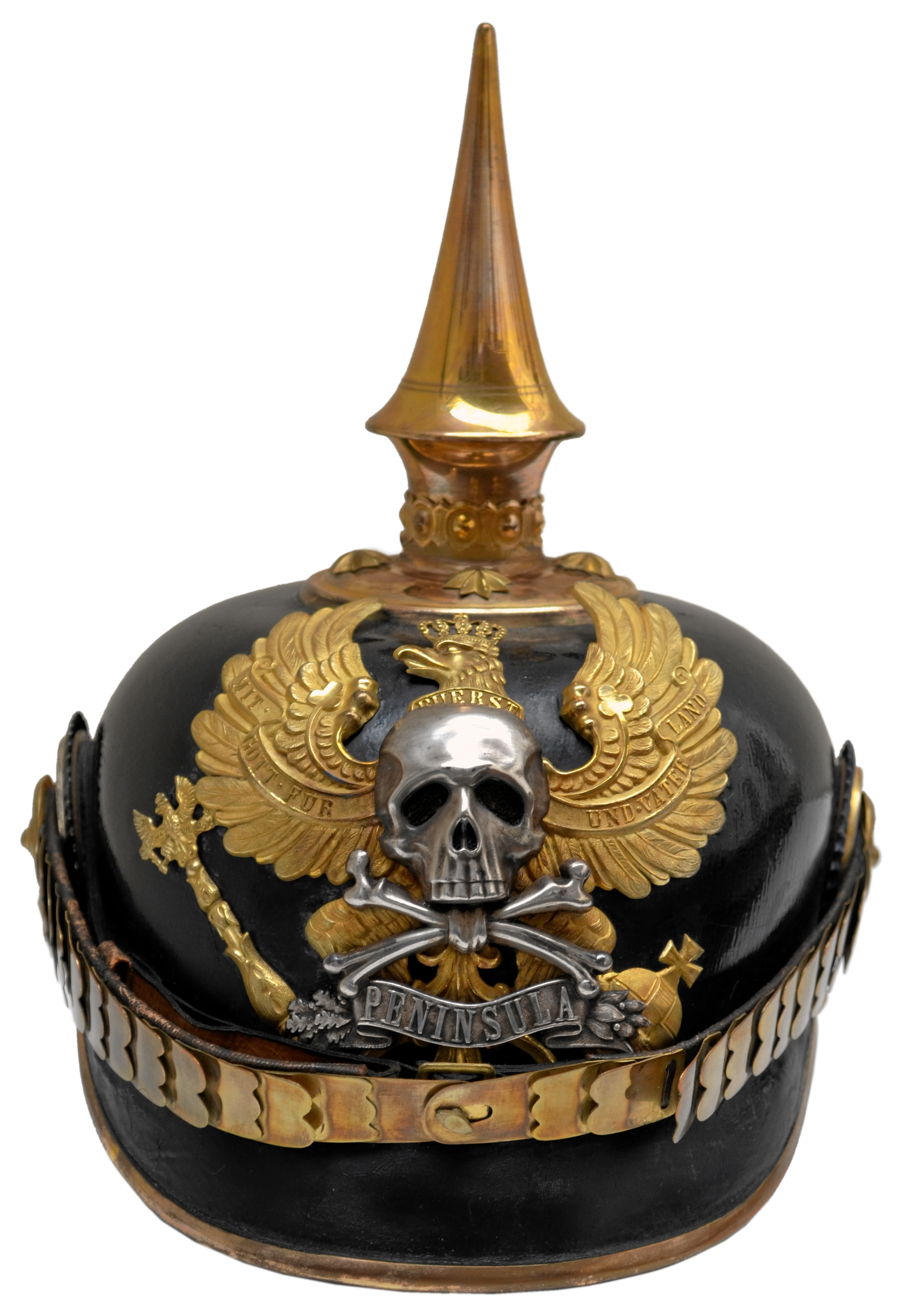
German Pickelhaube

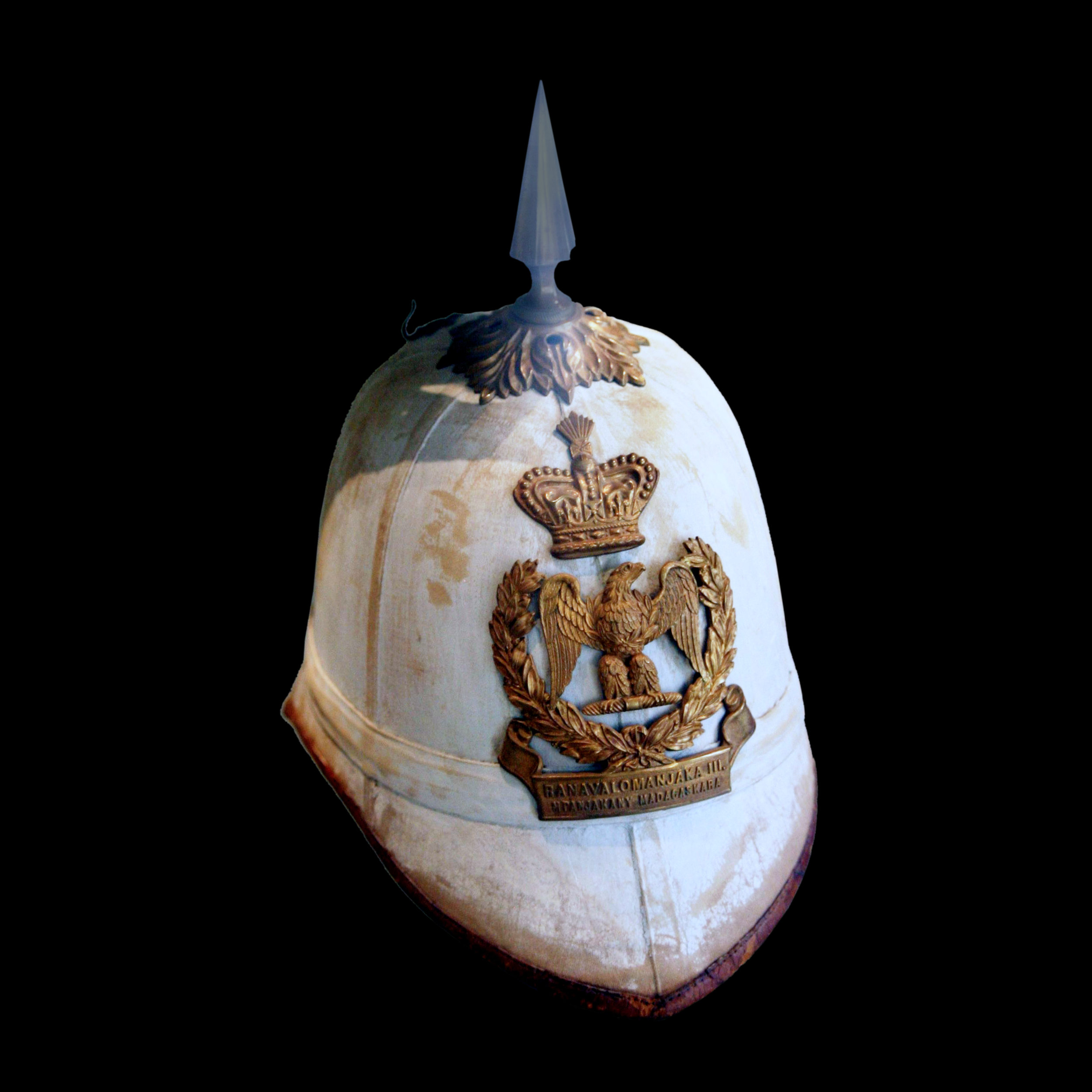
Late 19th-century pith helmet

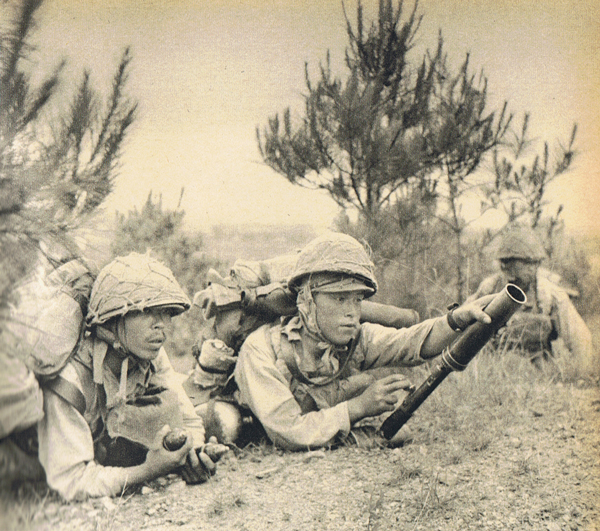
Type 90 helmets worn by the Japanese during the Second World War

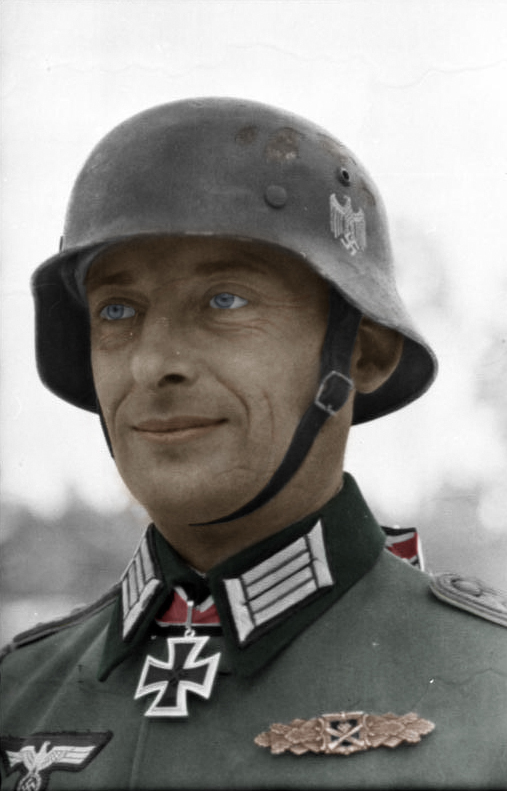
A German stahlhelm during World War II

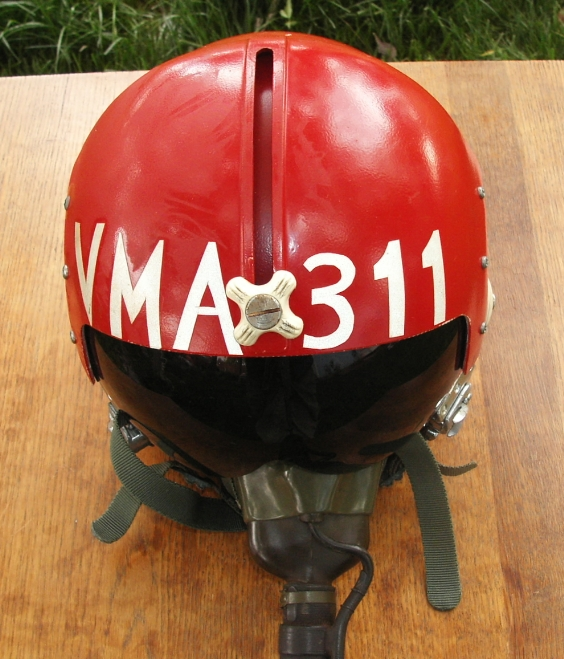
Vietnam War era Marine squadron VMA-311 flight helmet

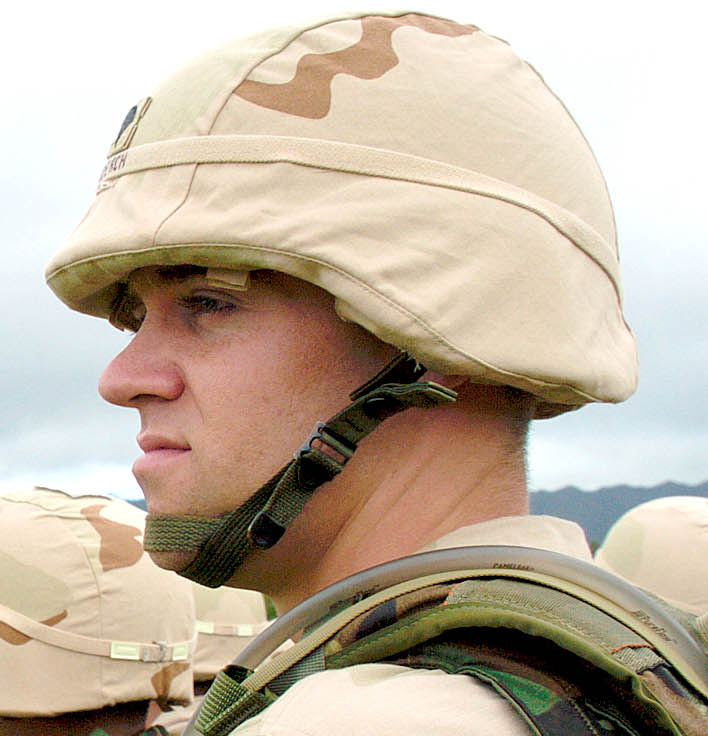
PASGT helmet
Work helmets

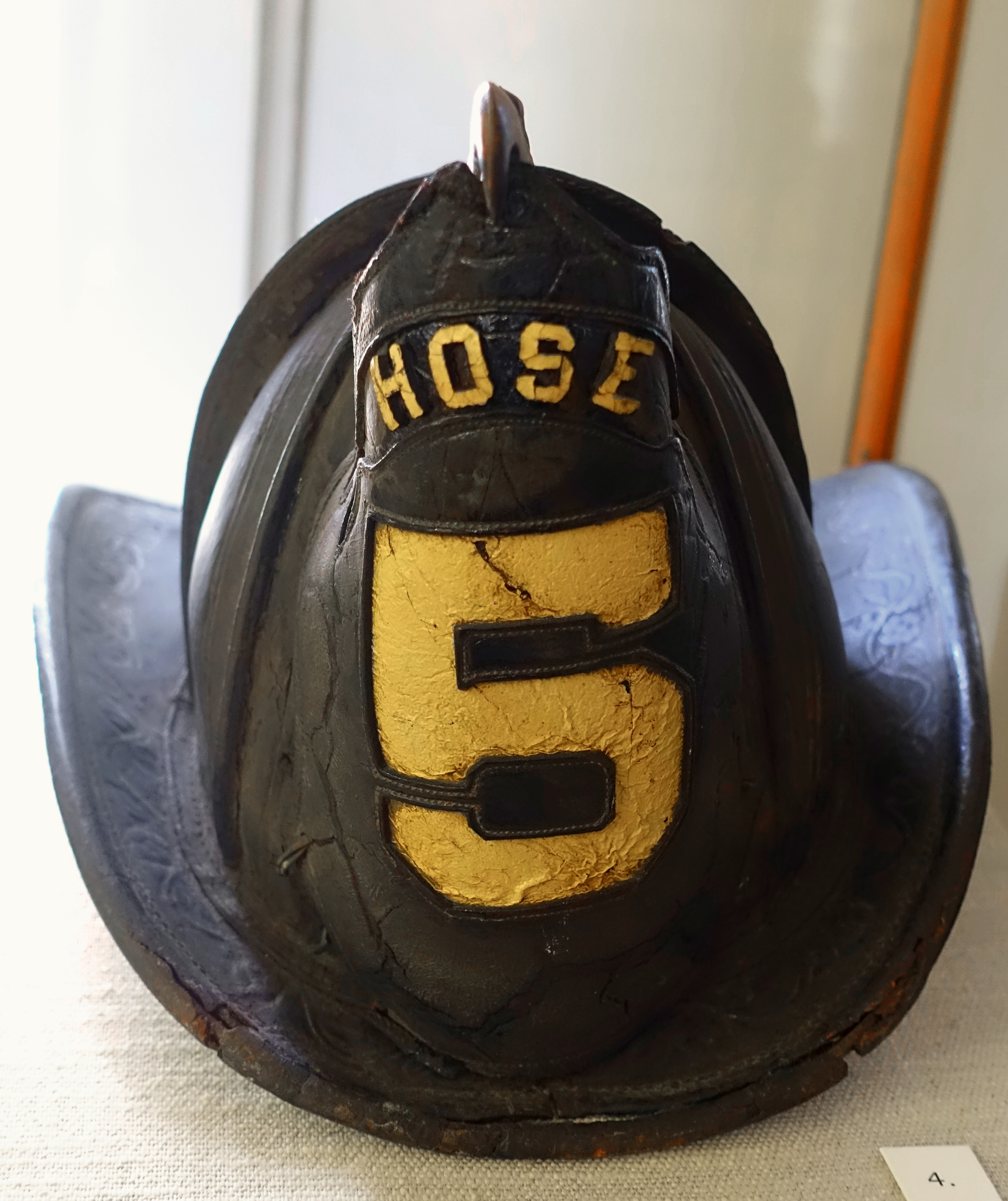
Leather and steel firefighting helmet

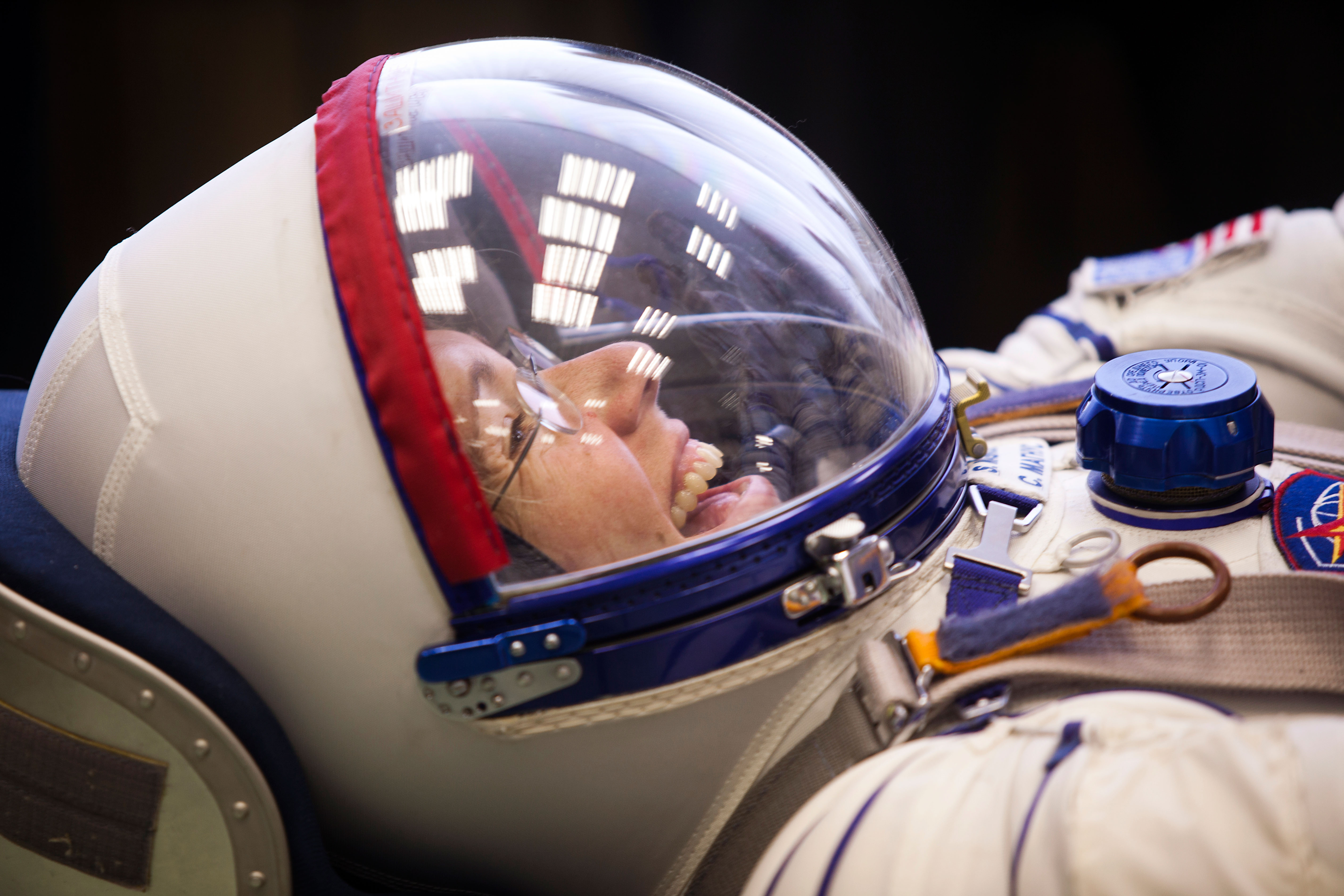
Astronaut helmet
Sport helmets

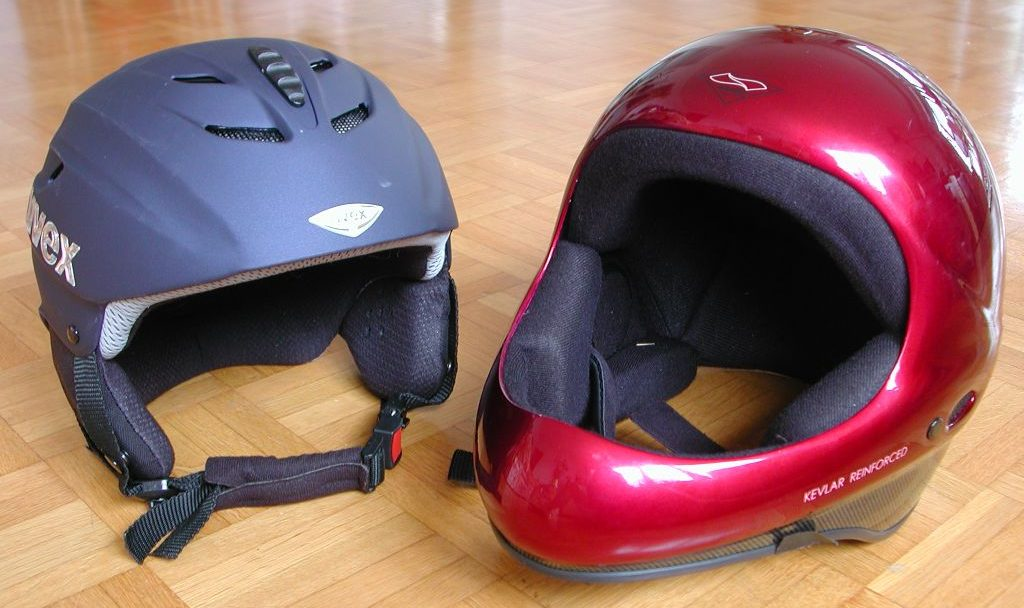
Ski helmet (left), paragliding helmet (right)

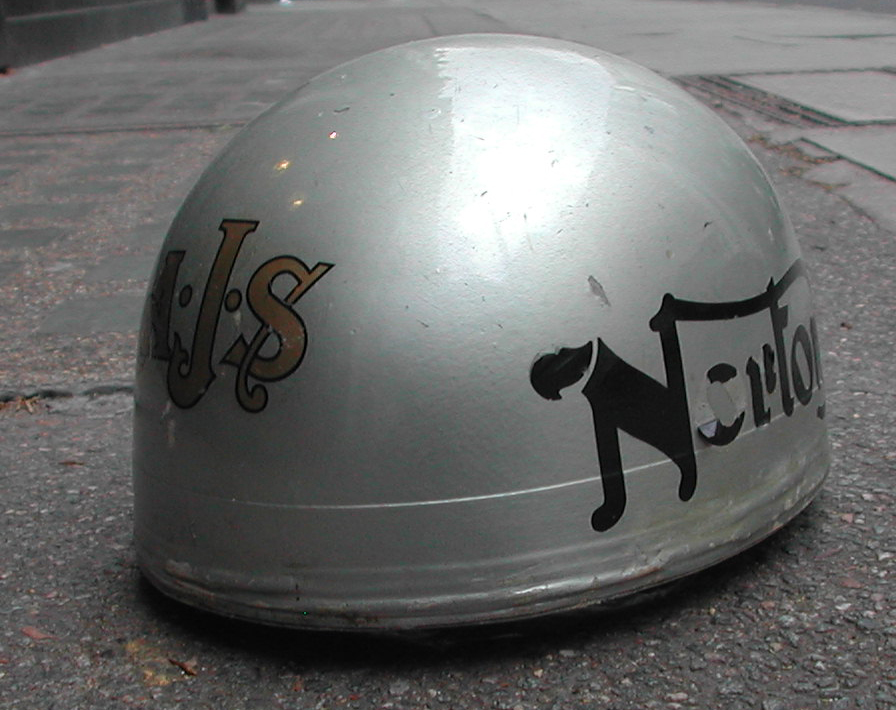
Aviakit motorcyclist "pudding basin" helmet

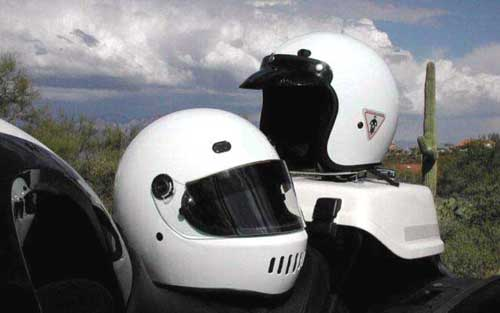
Full face and open face motorcycle helmets

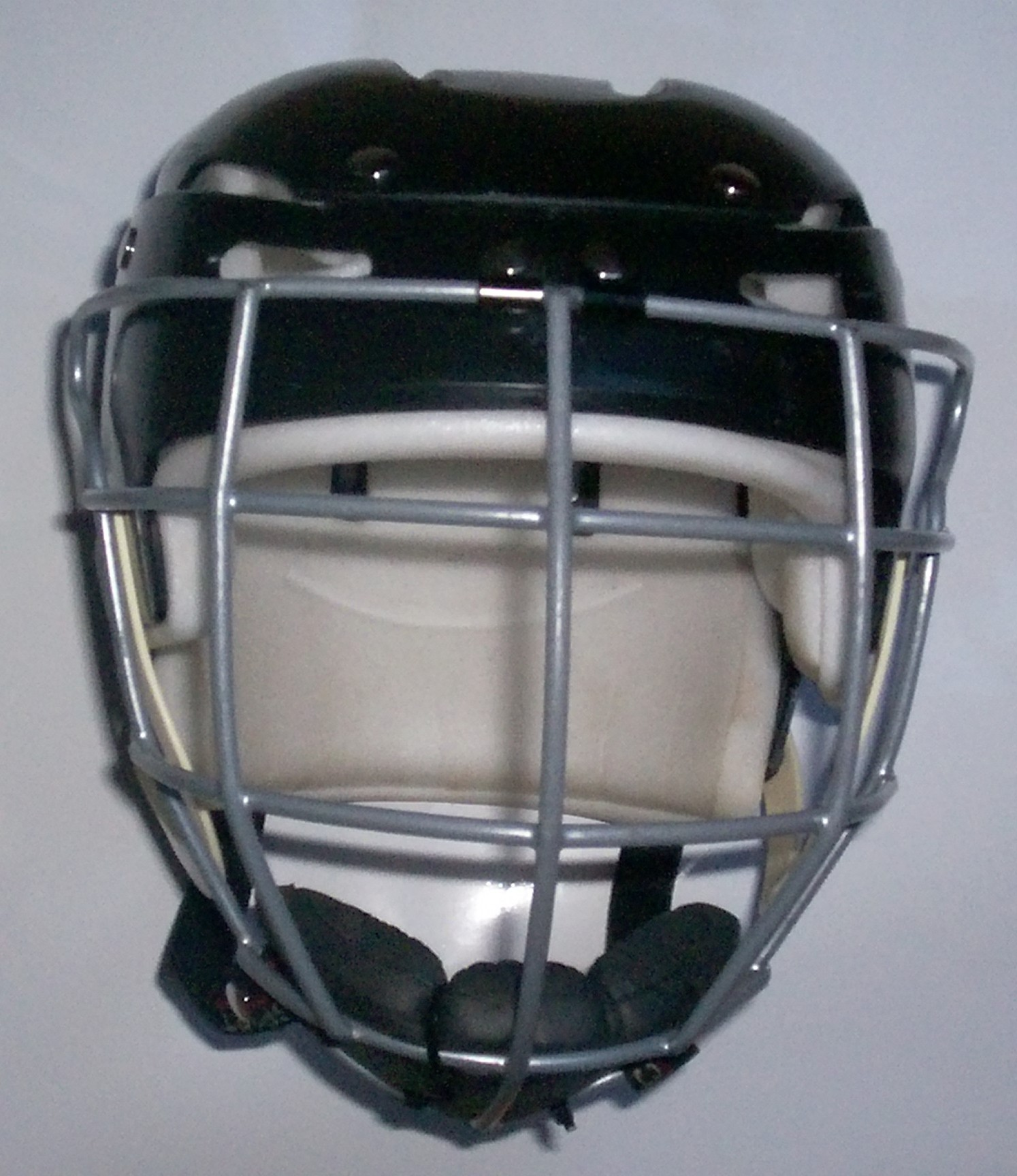
Hurling/Camogie helmet

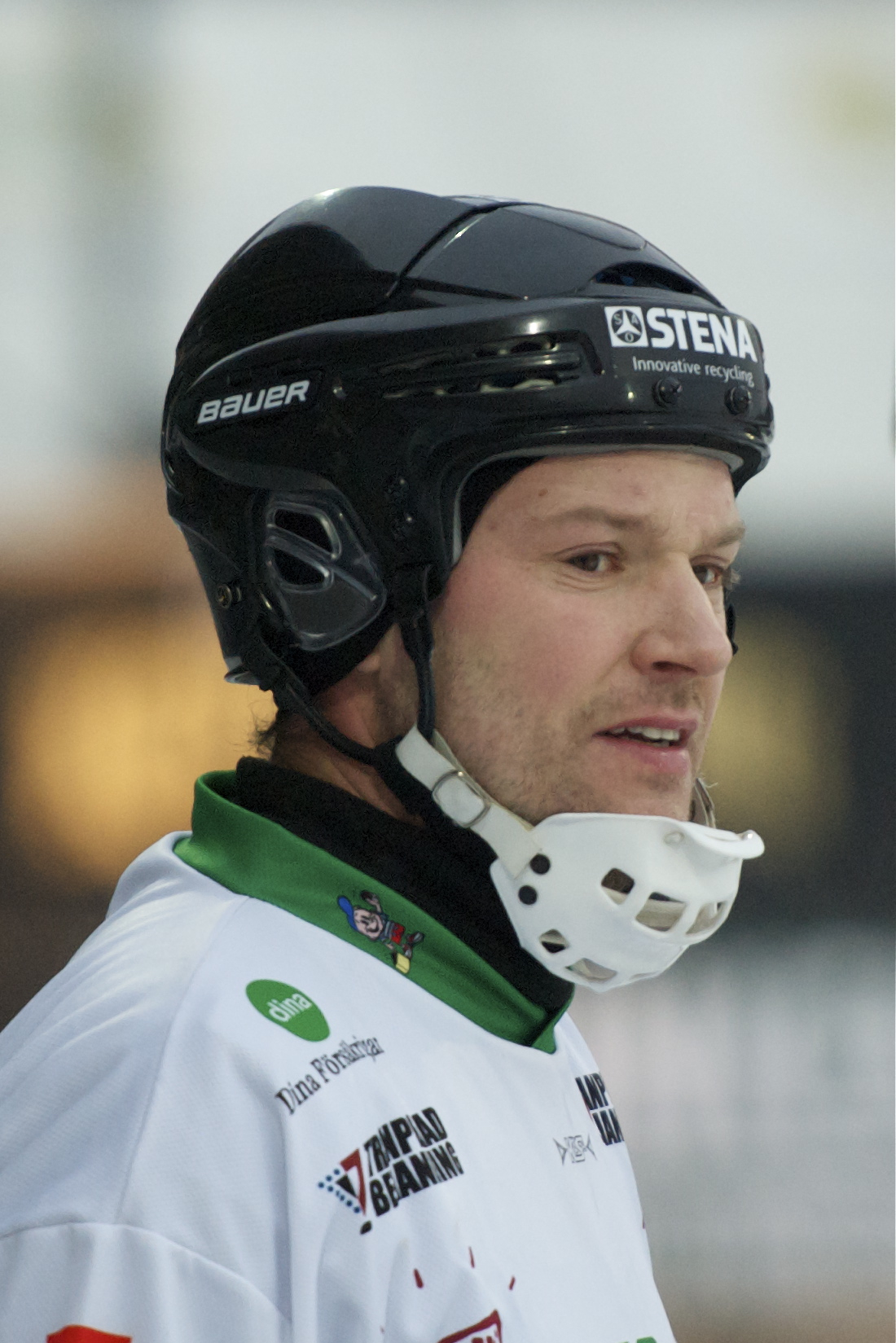
Magnus Muhrén wearing a bandy helmet

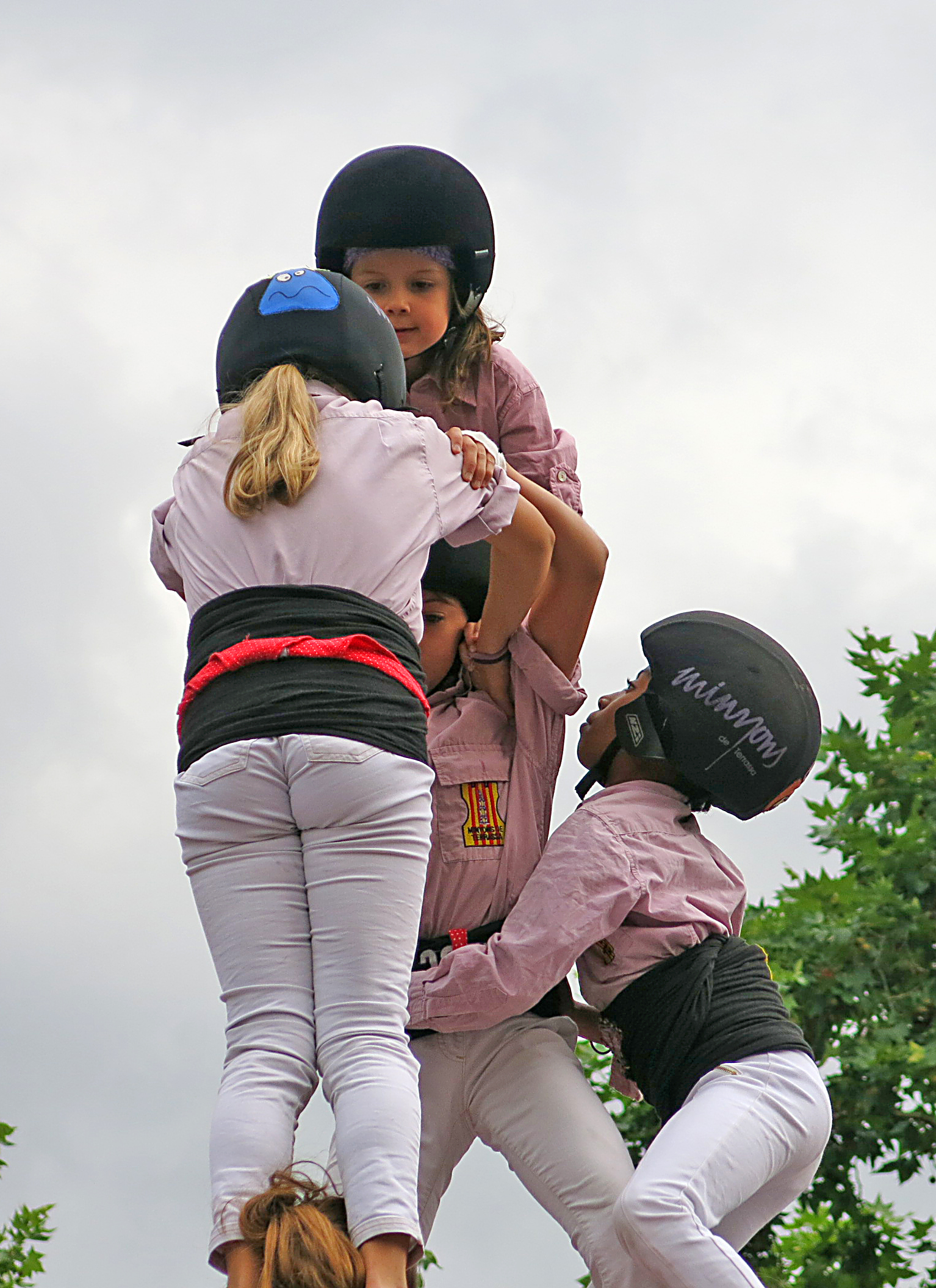
Helmets with soft outer surfaces used by children in castells

== See also ==
- Combat helmet
  - List of combat helmets
- Face shield
- Firefighter's helmet
- God helmet
- Helmet boxing
- Riot helmet
