= Helmet boxing =

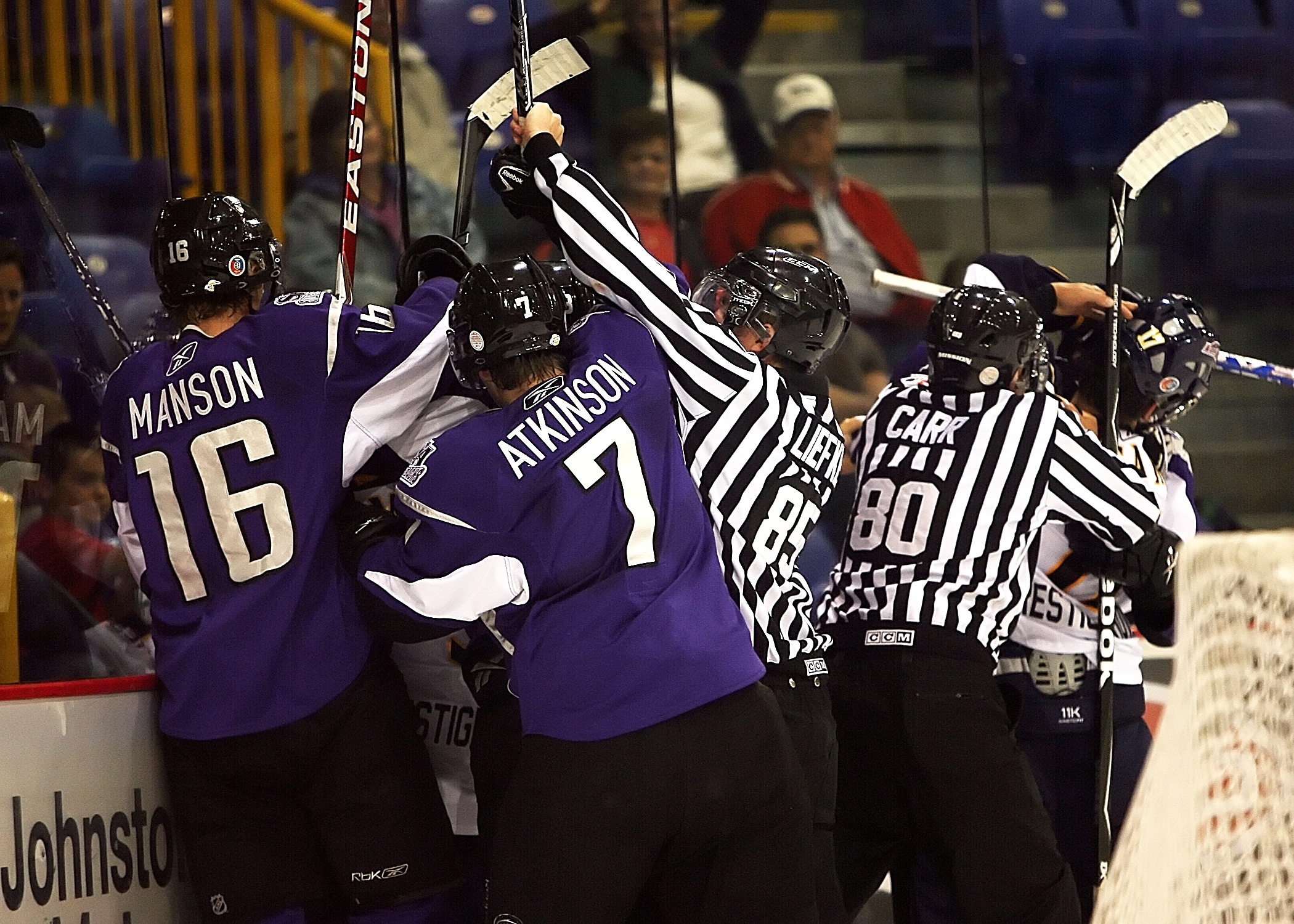
Ice hockey players wearing helmets fighting

Helmet boxing or locker boxing (also called a "cage rage", "buckets", "helmet fight" or "helmets and gloves") is a game played by primarily teenage hockey or lacrosse players in their dressing rooms, basements or locker rooms. These are generally not supervised by adults. Participants wear helmets and sometimes gloves and fight in a locker room. The object of the game is to score as many hits on the head as possible until the opponent is knocked down, gives up, or their helmet falls off.

The game is often seen as rite of passage for players and fighters feel peer pressure to participate. There is false sense of security among teens that face and head are protected.

An editorial in the May/June 2006 Clinical Journal of Sport Medicine brought attention to the game and its risk of concussion. The teenagers also frequently video tape the game and post the videos to video sharing websites like Myspace or YouTube.

== See also ==
- Professional boxing
