= David Cole (journalist) =

American journalist and documentary film director

- Born: 1968 (age 57–58); Los Angeles, California, U.S.
- Other name: David Stein
- Occupations: Journalist, documentary film director, writer

David Christopher Cole, also known as David Stein (born c. 1968), is an American journalist and film director. In the early 1990s, he gained publicity as a Holocaust denier. (Note: According to The Guardian, Cole believes that "Auschwitz was not an extermination camp in the manner of Treblinka, Sobibor, Belzec and Chelmno – which he acknowledged were part of a genocidal programme against Polish Jews; that the Holocaust ended in 1943, when the Nazis realised they needed Jewish slave labour for factories; and that there was no overarching, genocidal plan, but an evolving, morphing policy which claimed perhaps 4 million, rather than 6 million, Jewish lives": Carroll, Rory (May 3, 2013). "Hollywood conservative unmasked as notorious Holocaust revisionist". The Guardian. Archived from the original on June 12, 2018.) By the mid 90s, Cole split with prominent deniers after concluding that documentary evidence supported that millions of Jews had been murdered. Much of the controversy Cole attracted resulted from the fact that he is Jewish. After changing his name to David Stein following death threats, he became known for his activism on behalf of the Republican Party. He is the author of the 2014 book Republican Party Animal.

== Biography ==
=== Life until 1998 ===
Cole was raised in West Los Angeles as a secular Jew. His birth father, Leon Cole, was a USC medical research scientist who had a private practice that would prescribe lethal narcotics to celebrities, including Elvis Presley. Leon Cole died from a methamphetamine overdose when Cole was an infant. His mother remarried, and Cole's legal name is David Harvey. In his late teens, Cole embarked on a study of American political ideology. This led author Michael Shermer to coin the term "meta-ideologue" to describe Cole. In a 1994 article in Shermer's Skeptic magazine, Shermer wrote, "Where the other revisionists are political and/or racial ideologues, Cole's interests run at a deeper level. He is a meta-ideologue – an existentialist on a quest to understand how ideologues invent their realities."

In the 1990s, Cole appeared on the Montel Williams Show, the Phil Donahue Show, 60 Minutes, 48 Hours, and The Morton Downey Jr. Show. Ernest Hollander, the Auschwitz survivor who debated Cole on the Montel Williams Show, discovered after the show aired that the brother he thought was murdered after the two were separated upon arrival in Auschwitz was actually alive and well. The brother's neighbor had seen the Montel episode, and recognized the resemblance between the two Hollanders. Both brothers had thought the other was dead (Williams hosted the reunion on his show). In his autobiography, Cole claimed that this supported his theory that many of the Jews deported to Auschwitz in 1944 were falsely believed to be dead.

In 1993, Cole was interviewed by Timothy Ryback for The New Yorker. Other interviews from that time include the Jerusalem Report (which referred to Cole as "an unlikely media sensation" and "something of a media star"), the Detroit Jewish News, and Hustler. He also penned op-eds for the Los Angeles Times under his own name, and under the name Christopher Cole. In the early 1990s, Cole lectured on college campuses throughout the U.S. During a lecture at UCLA, he was assaulted on-stage, resulting in security rushing him off campus for his own safety.

According to The Guardian, Cole's main thesis is that "Auschwitz was not an extermination camp in the manner of Treblinka, Sobibor, Belzec and Chelmno – which he (Cole) acknowledged were part of a genocidal programme against Polish Jews; that the Holocaust ended in 1943, when the Nazis realised they needed Jewish slave labour for factories; and that there was no overarching, genocidal plan, but an evolving, morphing policy which claimed perhaps 4 million, rather than 6 million, Jewish lives." In 1994, Professor Deborah Lipstadt, told the Detroit Jewish News that there was a lot of "joy and rejoicing" in "revisionist" camps because of Cole, Detroit Jewish News editor Phil Jacobs listed Cole as a threat to the Jewish people alongside "Hitler, Hussein, and Arafat", and Rabbi Abraham Cooper, associate director of the Simon Wiesenthal Center, told The Jerusalem Report "I can't think of any other Jew who has gone so far in aiding and abetting the enemies of the Jewish people".

==== Changing views ====
In October of the same year, Cole worked with Auschwitz specialist Jean-Claude Pressac, who showed Cole the documentation regarding the gassing of Jews at the Natzweiler-Struthof concentration camp in Alsace. Cole found it fully convincing. Cole got approval from the French government to explore the Struthof chamber (with a government-provided escort) and saw it was an authentic gas chamber. Cole wanted to publish his findings, affirming that gas chambers are a historical fact. However, the "revisionist" camp was not interested. Cole then wrote a piece that argued that claims made by revisionists like Robert Faurisson were dishonest, adding: "I'm truly perplexed by the SURPRISE that some of you [Holocaust-deniers] are showing about my Struthof statements. Stop acting like you've been hustled, guys. From day one I made it clear that I'm a leftist, race-mixing, atheistic Jew who has no allegiance to any dogma and who'd gladly agree that there were gas chambers if only the proof could be found. It's not my fault if some of you thought that I was only saying those things to fool the public and that privately I was "one of you."" In 1995, Cole broke with the movement.

In January 1998, Irv Rubin, chairman of the Jewish Defense League, offered a monetary reward for information regarding Cole's whereabouts. The Anti-Defamation League stated that the JDL's reward offer implied that "it was prepared to take immediate, possibly violent, action" in order to "get rid" of Cole. In response to the threat, Cole entered into a deal with Rubin whereby he renounced his views and the JDL removed the "reward offer." The over-the-top "recantation" was met with widespread skepticism, with Michael Shermer writing in his 2000 book Denying History that Cole's retraction demanded "a healthy dose of skepticism" because it was "so unlike his earlier positions." On the JDL website, Rubin bragged that Cole's recantation is "evidence of the power of the Jewish Defense League.

=== 1998–2013 ===
Following the recantation, Cole changed his last name to Stein and began making mainstream Holocaust documentaries for a company he ran called the Tinbergen Archives. His 2007 film Nuremberg: The 60th Anniversary Director's Cut won the best feature-length documentary award and best score in a feature documentary at the 2008 Garden State Film Festival. His films Liberation Day: Dachau, Auschwitz: Silent Witness, The Lost Gas Chamber, and War Crimes and Trials are preserved in the Rosenblatt Holocaust Collection at Fordham University.

In 2004, Cole made an extensive on-camera interview with Hutton Gibson, the traditionalist Catholic father of filmmaker Mel Gibson, who was coming under criticism for perceived anti-semitism in the popular film The Passion of the Christ. Although Cole had the rights to the interview, Gibson asked Cole to withhold the interview until after Hutton Gibson's death. After Hutton Gibson's death in May 2020, Cole began to fundraise to complete a documentary about Gibson, but as of 2023, no footage has been released.

In 2008, Cole (as Stein) became active in mainstream conservative politics. As a blogger, his work appeared in or was cited by The Washington Times, Commentary, The Wall Street Journal, the New York Daily News, the L.A. Jewish Journal, WorldNetDaily, History News Network, Gawker, The New Republic, and The Hollywood Reporter. Cole (as Stein) appeared as a frequent guest on the Larry Elder Show on KABC Radio. He also became a member and co-organizer of the "secret" organization of Hollywood Republicans, Friends of Abe, founded by actor Gary Sinise. Stein also ran an organization called the Republican Party Animals, one of the largest Republican Party organizing operations on the West Coast. It held regular events in and around Los Angeles from a libertarian, non-socially conservative perspective aimed at attracting young people to the GOP. In the words of The Guardian, "David Stein brought right-wing congressmen, celebrities, writers and entertainment industry figures together for shindigs, closed to outsiders, where they could scorn liberals and proclaim their true beliefs. Over the past five years Stein's organization, Republican Party Animals, drew hundreds to regular events in and around Los Angeles, making him a darling of conservative blogs and talkshows. That he made respected documentaries on the Holocaust added intellectual cachet and Jewish support to Stein's cocktail of politics, irreverence and rock and roll."

=== After 2013 ===
In April 2013, Stein was outed as Cole by an ex-girlfriend. The L.A. County Republican Party sent out an email warning members about his history.

In 2014, Cole's autobiography, Republican Party Animal, was published by Feral House. Starting in 2015, he became a regular source in The Guardian for matters relating to Hollywood conservatives (in that capacity he has also been interviewed by Variety, and Truthdig). He was briefly employed as a writer for The Times of Israel, until protests over his past led to his dismissal. In January 2015, he became a staff writer and weekly columnist for Taki's Magazine; he remained there until April 2025.

In October 2015, a taxi driver in Ennis, Ireland, was jailed for five months after going on a vandalism spree that he claimed was inspired by Cole's videos.

Documents released as part of an ongoing lawsuit showed that Tucker Carlson was aware of Cole's work and was sharing his articles with others.

== Books ==
- David Cole (June 10, 2014). Republican Party Animal: The "Bad Boy of Holocaust History" Blows the Lid Off Hollywood's Secret Right-Wing Underground. Feral House. ISBN 978-1-936239-91-7.

== Filmography ==
=== Film ===
Year	Title	Role	Notes
1989	Zombie Party	Annoying Party Guest	Direct-to-video
1992	David Cole Interviews Dr. Franciszek Piper	Writer/Producer/Narrator	Self-produced documentary
