= The Science of Good and Evil =

2004 book by Michael Shermer

The Science of Good and Evil: Why People Cheat, Gossip, Care, Share, and Follow the Golden Rule
- Cover of the first edition
- Author: Michael Shermer
- Language: English
- Subject: Evolutionary ethics
- Publisher: Henry Holt and Company
- Publication date: 2004
- Publication place: United States
- Media type: Print (hardcover and paperback)
- Pages: 350
- ISBN: 0-8050-7520-8
- OCLC: 52704770
- Preceded by: Denying History: Who Says the Holocaust Never Happened and Why Do They Say It?
- Followed by: Science Friction: Where the Known Meets the Unknown

The Science of Good and Evil: Why People Cheat, Gossip, Care, Share, and Follow the Golden Rule is a 2004 book by author Michael Shermer that examines the transition of humans from creatures driven by social instincts to those governed by moral considerations. The book was published by Henry Holt and Company.

== Synopsis ==
In The Science of Good and Evil, science historian Michael Shermer investigates the evolutionary and psychological roots of human morality. The book delves into fundamental questions regarding human conduct, and the reasons behind behaviors such as cheating, gossiping, altruism, generosity, and adherence to ethical standards like the Golden Rule. In addition, it examines the implications of science on concepts such as destiny, free will, and the existence of absolute morality. Shermer draws on examples that span various cultures including the Yanomami to provide readers with insights on morality and human nature.

== Reviews ==
In discussing Shermer's approach to ethics, a review by Ian Mason in the National Post said that he "makes a persuasive case for the Golden Rule as the foundation of morality" but "severely weakens his case by applying the 'scientific' label to all sorts of assertions and concepts that don't warrant it." Mason also said that "This stretching of the proper scope of scientific reasoning is symptomatic of Shermer's approach to systems he wishes to debunk."

Kirkus Reviews found the book a “thought-provoking and well-honed examination of deep questions”. The review describes Shermer’s ability to draw familiar instances such as from the Columbine High School Massacre to the Holocaust, as effective to support his thesis.

Paul Copan of the Christian Research Institute outlines several “philosophically and apologetically significant problems in [Shermer's] work”. Copan finds issue with Shermer’s argument that scientific evidence can explain why humans are morally obligated to act, when the “backdrop of a supremely self‐aware, rational, good, free, personal Being who made us in His image” is a better explanation. Copan also takes issue with Shermer’s explanation of the emergence of free will or moral freedom and his misunderstanding of theistic ethics. Copan summarizes his thoughts by describing Shermer as having “sometimes helpful insights and perspectives, [but] his naturalism leaves us looking for something more”.

Kenneth W. Krause of Internet Infidels described some of Shermer's work as "unoriginal" comparing many of his views as similar to Sigmund Freud's The Future of an Illusion. He also found that Shermer overreaches in "attempting to provide for the reader a relatively unsophisticated alternative ethical system based on four principles". Overall, Krause describes the text as "replete with valuable insights and facts" and states that it "urges us to stand firm in the face of irrationality and intellectual lethargy as we reason and empathize our way through crises, great and small, judging them individually according to their particular challenges."

In the College Quarterly, Howard Doughty wrote: "Shermer does not offer a very satisfactory definition of either good or evil. ... He does, however, occasionally speak eloquently about the ways in which human beings are challenged by moral notions and have generated forceful moral codes ... He fails, however, to locate morality in any kind of conceptual framework that would allow us to treat moral ideas as anything more than human judgments. There is nothing wrong with this, but such a view is inconsistent with the implication of the book's title, which at least suggests that good and evil are actual axiological categories that exist independent of human opinion." Doughty concludes that the book is a "very good effort in the popularization of scientific exploration into an inherently contentious subject".

== Release details ==
- Shermer, Michael (2004). The Science of Good and Evil (1st edition (hardcover) ed.). New York: Henry Holt and Company. ISBN 0-8050-7520-8. 350 pages.

== See also ==
- Scientific skepticism
- Evolutionary ethics
- Why Darwin Matters
- The Moral Arc
