= Michael Shermer =

American science writer (born 1954)

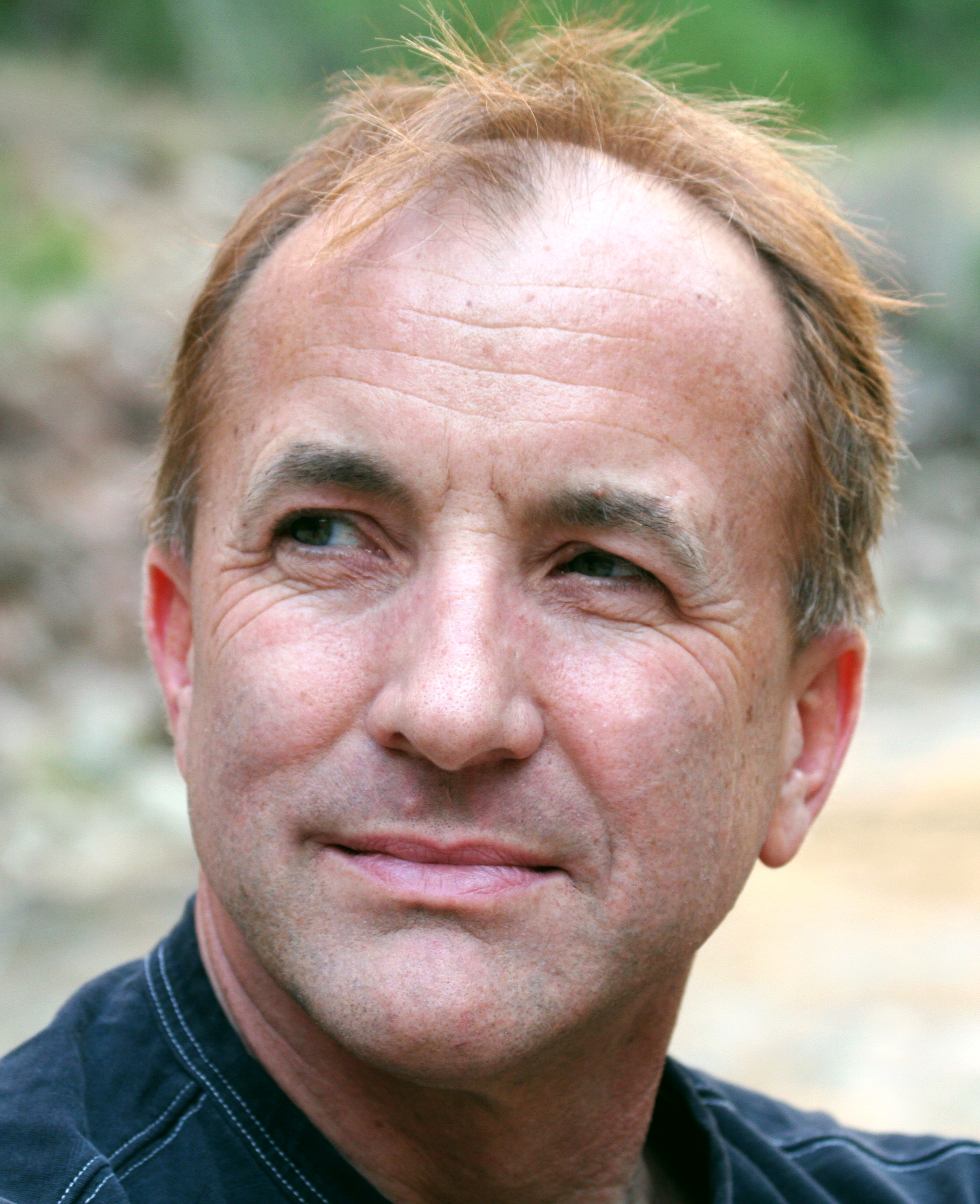
- Shermer in 2007
- Born: September 8, 1954 (age 72); Los Angeles, California, U.S.
- Education: Pepperdine University (BA); California State University, Fullerton (MA); Claremont Graduate University (PhD)
- Occupations: Writer, historian of science, editor
- Title: Editor-in-chief of Skeptic, adjunct professor at Chapman University
- Website: Official website

Signature
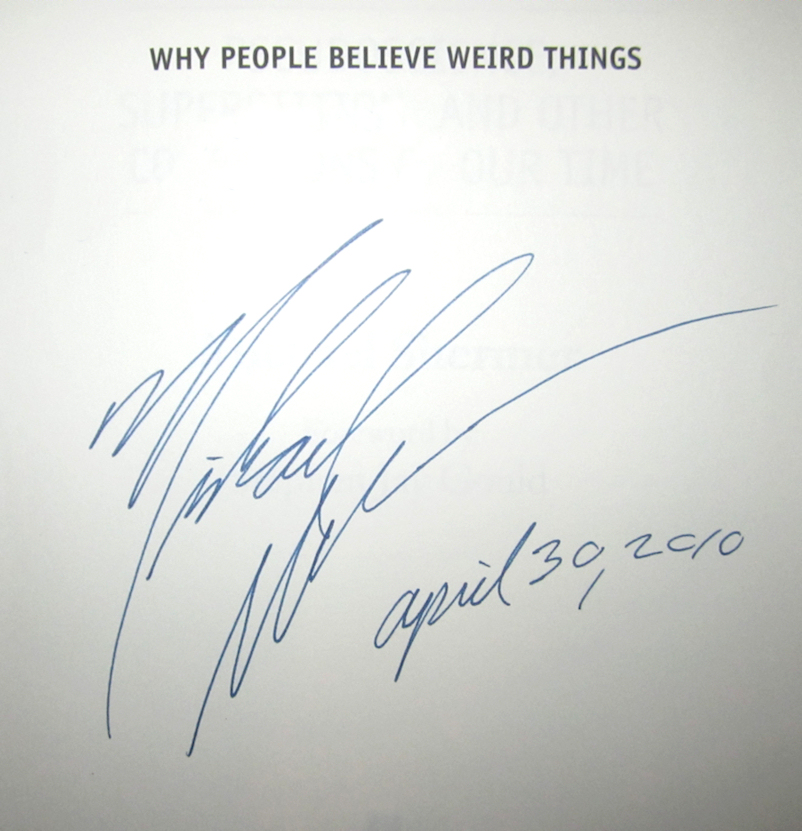

Michael Brant Shermer (born September 8, 1954) is an American science writer, historian of science, executive director of The Skeptics Society, and founding publisher of Skeptic magazine, a publication focused on investigating pseudoscientific and supernatural claims. The author of over a dozen books, Shermer is known for engaging in debates on pseudoscience and religion in which he emphasizes scientific skepticism.

Shermer was the co-producer and co-host of Exploring the Unknown, a 13-hour Fox Family television series broadcast in 1999. From April 2001 to January 2019, he contributed a monthly Skeptic column to Scientific American magazine.

Shermer was raised in a non-religious household, before converting to Christian fundamentalism as a teenager. He stopped believing in God during graduate school, influenced by a traumatic accident that left his then-girlfriend paralyzed. He identifies as an agnostic and an atheist, but prefers "skeptic". He also advocates for humanism. Shermer became an Internet-ordained clergyman in the Universal Life Church and has performed weddings.

== Early life and education ==
Michael Brant Shermer was born on September 8, 1954, in Los Angeles, California. He is partly of Greek and German ancestry. Shermer was raised in Southern California, primarily in the La Cañada Flintridge area. His parents divorced when he was four and later remarried. He has a step-sister, two step-brothers, and two half-sisters.

Shermer attended Sunday school but said he was otherwise raised in a nonreligious household. He began his senior year of high school in 1971, when the evangelical movement in the United States was growing in popularity. At the behest of a friend, Shermer embraced Christianity. He attended the Presbyterian Church in Glendale, California and observed a sermon delivered by a "dynamic and histrionic preacher" who encouraged him to come forward to be saved. For seven years, Shermer evangelized door-to-door. He also attended an informal Christian fellowship at "The Barn" in La Crescenta, California, where he described enjoying the social aspects of religion, especially the theological debates.

In 1972, he graduated from Crescenta Valley High School and enrolled at Pepperdine University, intending to pursue Christian theology. Shermer changed majors to psychology once he learned that a doctorate in theology required proficiency in Hebrew, Greek, Latin, and Aramaic. He completed his BA in psychology at Pepperdine in 1976.

Shermer went on to study experimental psychology at California State University, Fullerton. Discussions with his professors, along with studies in the natural and social sciences, led him to question his religious beliefs. Fueled by what he perceived to be the intolerance generated by the absolute morality taught in his religious studies; the hypocrisy in what many believers preached and what they practiced; and a growing awareness of other religious beliefs that were determined by the temporal, geographic, and cultural circumstances in which their adherents were born, he abandoned his religious views halfway through graduate school.

Shermer attributed the paralysis of his college girlfriend as a key point when he lost faith. After she was in an automobile accident that broke her back and rendered her paralyzed from the waist down, Shermer relayed, "If anyone deserved to be healed it was her, and nothing happened, so I just thought there was probably no God at all."

He earned an MA degree in psychology from California State University, Fullerton in 1978.

== Career ==
=== Cycling ===
After earning his MA in experimental psychology in 1978, Shermer worked as a writer for a bicycle magazine in Irvine, California. He took up bicycle racing after his first assignment, a Cycles Peugeot press conference. He completed a century ride (100 miles) and started to ride hundreds of miles a week.

Shermer began competitive cycling in 1979 and rode professionally for ten years, primarily in long distance ultramarathon road racing. He is a founding member of the Ultra Cycling Hall of Fame.

Shermer worked with cycling technologists in developing better products for the sport. During his association with Bell Helmets, a bicycle-race sponsor, he advised them on design issues regarding expanded-polystyrene for use in cycling helmets, which would absorb greater impact than the old leather "hairnet" helmets used by bicyclists for decades. Shermer advised them that if their helmets looked too much like motorcycle helmets, in which polystyrene was already being used, and not like the old hairnet helmets, no serious cyclists or amateur would use them. This suggestion led to their model, the V1 Pro, which looked like a black leather hairnet, but functioned on the inside like a motorcycle helmet. In 1982, he worked with Wayman Spence, whose small supply company, Spenco Medical, adapted the gel technology Spence developed for bedridden patients with pressure sores into cycling gloves and saddles to alleviate the carpal tunnel syndrome and saddle sores suffered by cyclists.

While a long distance racer, he helped to found the 3,000-mile nonstop transcontinental bicycle Race Across America (RAAM), along with Lon Haldeman and John Marino, in which he competed five times (1982, 1983, 1984, 1985, and 1989), was an assistant race director for six years, and the executive race director for seven years. An acute medical condition is named for him: "Shermer's Neck" is pain in and extreme weakness of the neck muscles found among long-distance bicyclists. Shermer suffered the condition about 2,000 miles into the 1983 Race Across America. Shermer's embrace of scientific skepticism crystallized during his time as a cyclist, explaining, "I became a skeptic on Saturday, August 6, 1983, on the long climbing road to Loveland Pass, Colorado", after months of training under the guidance of a "nutritionist" with an unaccredited PhD. After years of practicing acupuncture, chiropractic, massage therapy, negative ions, rolfing, pyramid power, and fundamentalist Christianity to improve his life and training, Shermer stopped rationalizing the failure of these practices.

Shermer participated in the Furnace Creek 508 in October 2011, a qualifying race for RAAM, finishing second in the four man team category.

Shermer has written on the subject of pervasive doping in competitive cycling and a game theoretic view of the dynamics driving the problem in several sports. He covered EPO doping and described it as widespread and well known within the sport, which was later shown to be instrumental in the doping scandal surrounding Lance Armstrong in 2010.

=== Teaching ===
While cycling, Shermer taught Psychology 101 during the evenings at Glendale Community College, a two-year college. Wanting to teach at a four-year university, he decided to earn his PhD. He lost interest in psychology and switched to studying the history of science, earning his PhD at Claremont Graduate University in 1991. His dissertation was titled Heretic-Scientist: Alfred Russel Wallace and the Evolution of Man: A Study on the Nature of Historical Change.

Shermer then became an adjunct professor of the history of science at Occidental College, California. In 2007, Shermer became a senior research fellow at Claremont Graduate University. In 2011, he worked as an adjunct professor at Chapman University, and was later made a Presidential Fellow. At Chapman, he taught a yearly critical thinking course called Skepticism 101.

=== Skeptics Society ===
In 1991, Shermer and Pat Linse co-founded the Skeptics Society in Los Angeles with the assistance of Kim Ziel Shermer. The Skeptics Society is a non-profit organization that promotes scientific skepticism and seeks to debunk pseudoscience and irrational beliefs. It started off as a garage hobby but eventually grew into a full-time occupation. The Skeptics Society publishes the magazine Skeptic, organizes the Caltech Lecture Series, and as of 2017, it had over 50,000 members.

Shermer is listed as one of the scientific advisors for the American Council on Science and Health (ACSH).

In June 2026, Shermer was listed as an appointee to the UAP Science Advisory Council; which was created by request of the White House and will collaborate with federal agencies such as Federal Bureau of Investigation and the All-domain Anomaly Resolution Office among others. Shermer was quoted in Skeptic magazine saying "I am honored to serve alongside such an accomplished group of scientists and scholars in helping ensure that questions surrounding UAP are approached with the highest standards of scientific inquiry." Other notable members of UAP Science Advisory Council include two proponents of Ufology: Garry Nolan and Avi Loeb.

=== Published works ===
Shermer's early writing covered cycling, followed by math and science education for children which included several collaborations with Arthur Benjamin.

From April 2001 to January 2019, he wrote the monthly Skeptic column for Scientific American. He has also contributed to Time magazine.

He is the author of a series of books that attempt to explain the ubiquity of irrational or poorly substantiated beliefs, including UFOs, Bigfoot, and paranormal claims. Writing in Why People Believe Weird Things: Pseudoscience, Superstition, and Other Confusions of Our Time (1997), Shermer refers to "patternicity", his term for pareidolia and apophenia or the willing suspension of disbelief. He writes in the Introduction:

So we are left with the legacy of two types of thinking errors: Type 1 Error: believing a falsehood and Type 2 Error: rejecting a truth. ... Believers in UFOs, alien abductions, ESP, and psychic phenomena have committed a Type 1 Error in thinking: they are believing a falsehood. ... It's not that these folks are ignorant or uninformed; they are intelligent but misinformed. Their thinking has gone wrong.

In How We Believe: The Search for God in an Age of Science (2000), Shermer explored the psychology behind the belief in God.

In February 2002, he characterized the position that "God had no part in the process [of the evolution of mankind]" as the "standard scientific theory". This statement was criticized in January 2006 by the scientist Eugenie Scott, who commented that science makes no claim about God one way or the other.

Shermer's book In Darwin's Shadow: The Life and Science of Alfred Russel Wallace: A Biographical Study on the Psychology of History (2002) was based on his dissertation.

In his book The Borderlands of Science, (2001) Shermer rated several noted scientists for gullibility toward "pseudo" or "borderland" ideas, using a rating version, developed by psychologist Frank Sulloway, of the Big Five model of personality. Shermer rated Wallace extremely high (99th percentile) on agreeableness/accommodation and argued that this was the key trait in distinguishing Wallace from scientists who give less credence to fringe ideas.

In May 2002, Shermer and Alex Grobman published their book Denying History: Who Says the Holocaust Never Happened and Why Do They Say It?, which examined and countered the Holocaust denial movement. This book recounts meeting various denialists and concludes that free speech is the best way to deal with pseudohistory.

Science Friction: Where the Known Meets the Unknown was released in 2005.

His 2006 book Why Darwin Matters: The Case Against Intelligent Design marshals point-by-point arguments supporting evolution, sharply criticizing intelligent design. This book also argues that science cannot invalidate religion, and that Christians and conservatives can and should accept evolution.

In The Mind of The Market: Compassionate Apes, Competitive Humans, and Other Tales from Evolutionary Economics (2007), Shermer reported on the findings of multiple behavioral and biochemical studies that address evolutionary explanations for modern behavior. It garnered several critical reviews from academics, with skeptic Robert T. Carroll saying: "He has been blinded by his libertarianism and seduced by the allure of evolutionary psychology to explain everything, including ethics and economics."

In May 2011, Shermer published The Believing Brain: From Ghosts and Gods to Politics and Conspiracies: How We Construct Beliefs and Reinforce Them as Truths. In a review for Commonweal, writer Joseph Bottum described Shermer as more of a popularizer of science and stated, "science emerges from The Believing Brain as a full-blown ideology, lifted out of its proper realm and applied to all the puzzles of the world."

In January 2015, Shermer published The Moral Arc: How Science and Reason Lead Humanity Toward Truth, Justice, and Freedom.

Writing for Society in 2017, Eugene Goodheart noted that Shermer identified skepticism with scientism and observed that in his book Skeptic: Viewing the World with a Skeptical Eye (2016) Shermer was a "vivid and lucid" writer who imported his "political convictions into his advocacy of evolutionary theory, compromising his objectivity as a defender of science."

Harriet Hall said of Shermer's 2018 publication, Heavens on Earth, that "the topics of Heavens on Earth are usually relegated to the spheres of philosophy and religion, but Shermer approaches them through science, looking for evidence – or lack thereof."

In 2020, Shermer launched Giving the Devil His Due, a series of 30 reflections on essays that he had published the previous 15 years.

=== Media appearances and lectures ===
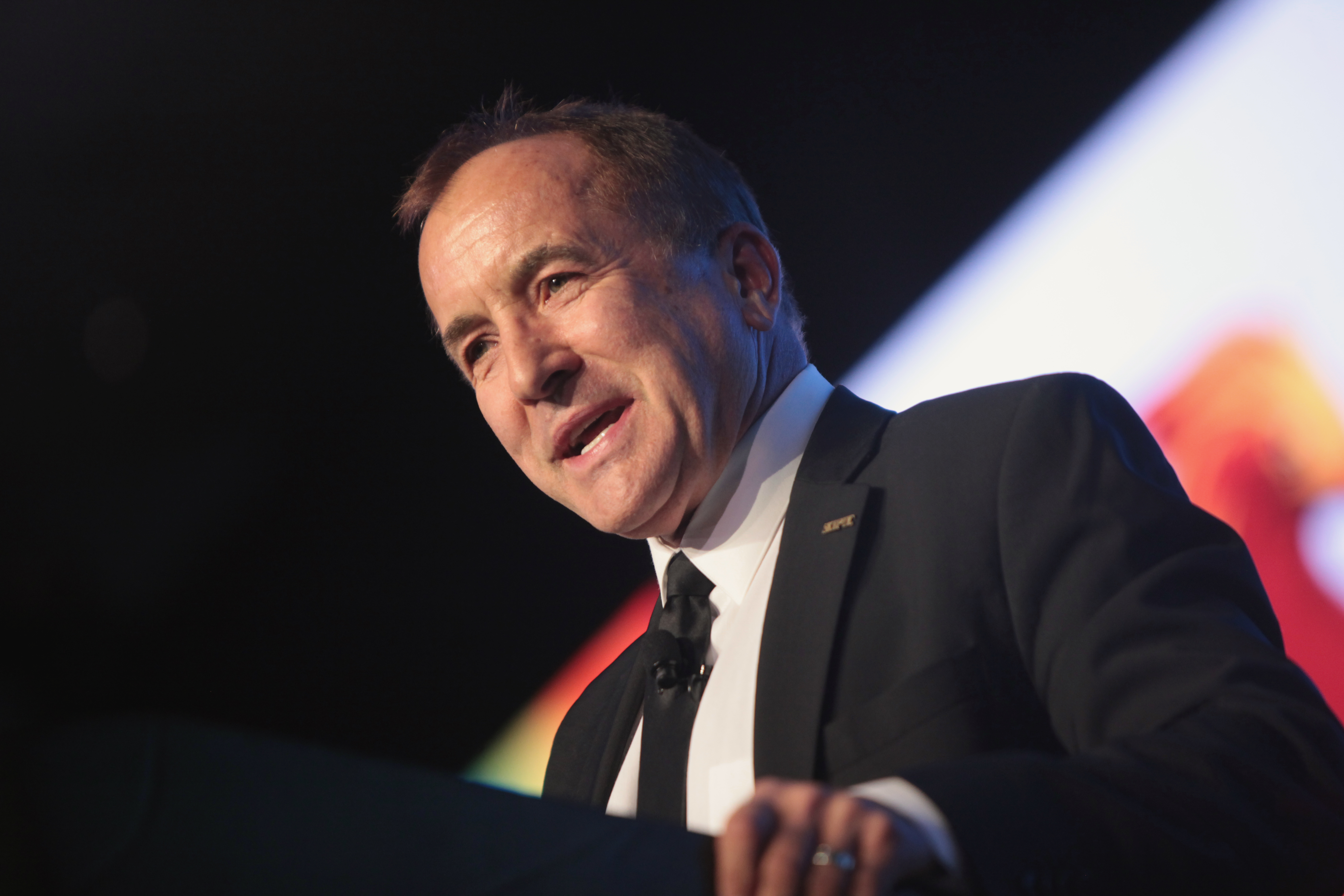
Shermer giving a talk at FreedomFest in Las Vegas, Nevada, in July 2016

Shermer appeared as a guest on Donahue in 1994 to respond to Bradley Smith's and David Cole's Holocaust denial claims, and in 1995 on The Oprah Winfrey Show to challenge Rosemary Altea's psychic claims.

In 1994 and 1995, Shermer made several appearances on NBC's daytime paranormal-themed show The Other Side. He proposed a skepticism-oriented reality show to the producers but it did not move forward. Several years later Fox Family Channel, picked up the series. In 1999, Shermer co-produced and co-hosted the Fox Family TV series Exploring the Unknown. Budgeted at approximately $200,000 per episode, the series was viewed by Shermer as a direct extension of the work done at the Skeptics Society and Skeptic magazine, with a neutral title chosen to broaden viewership.

Shermer made a guest appearance in a 2004 episode of Penn & Teller's Bullshit!, in which he argued that events in the Bible constitute "mythic storytelling", rather than events described literally. His stance was supported by the show's hosts, who have expressed their own atheism. The episode in question, The Bible: Fact or Fiction?, sought to debunk the notion that the Bible is an empirically reliable historical record. Opposing Shermer was Paul L. Maier, professor of ancient history at Western Michigan University.

Shermer presented at the three Beyond Belief events from 2006 to 2008. He has presented at several TED conferences with "Why people believe strange things" in 2006, "The pattern behind self-deception" in 2010, and "Reasonable Doubt" in 2015.

Shermer has debated Deepak Chopra several times, including on the ABC News program Nightline in March 2010. In his book Heavens on Earth Shermer writes that he was initially open minded to Chopra's New Age arguments and agreed to attending a three-week spiritual retreat, after which he concluded that anyone would feel better after a vacation.

In 2012, Shermer was one of three guest speakers at the first Reason Rally in Washington, D.C., an event attended by thousands of atheists, where he gave a talk titled "The Moral Arc of Reason." That same year, Shermer participated in an Intelligence Squared debate titled "Science Refutes God" paired with Lawrence Krauss, and opposing Dinesh D'Souza and Ian Hutchinson.

He is also an occasional guest on Skepticality, the official podcast of Skeptic.

Shermer appeared in the 2014 documentary Merchants of Doubt.

== Allegations of sexual assault and harassment ==
Shermer was accused of sexual harassment by two women. Shermer has denied these allegations. In 2019, Illinois Wesleyan University canceled Shermer's visit for the President's Convocation at that institution after it learned of the sexual assault allegations.

Writing for The Guardian in 2020 in a review of his book Giving the Devil His Due, Fara Dabhoiwala stated that several of Shermer's public speaking engagements had been canceled as a result of these allegations. In 2018, Undark Magazine reported that the allegations against Shermer began to emerge in 2013 and 2014. Shermer had sent cease and desist letters to the student-run newspaper of Santa Barbara City College and accused the editor of defamation in an email to the college.

== Personal life ==
Shermer married Kim Ziel. They had one daughter together and later divorced. On June 25, 2014, he married Jennifer Graf, a native of Cologne, Germany.

== Political positions ==
Shermer is a self-described libertarian. In a 2015 interview, Shermer stated that he preferred to talk about individual issues after previous experience with people refusing to listen to him after learning he held libertarian views.

In 2000, Shermer voted for libertarian Harry Browne, on the assumption that the winner of the Al Gore – George W. Bush contest would be irrelevant. He later regretted this decision, believing that Bush's foreign policy made the world more dangerous. He voted for John Kerry in 2004. Shermer named Thomas Jefferson as his favorite president, for his championing of liberty and his application of scientific thinking to the political, economic, and social spheres.

In June 2006, Shermer, who formerly expressed skepticism regarding the mainstream scientific views on global warming, wrote in Scientific American magazine that, in the light of the accumulation of evidence, the position of denying global warming is no longer tenable.

=== Gun control ===
Shermer supports some measures to reduce gun-related violence. He once opposed most gun control measures, primarily because of his beliefs in the principles of increasing individual freedom and decreasing government intervention, and also because he has owned guns for most of his life. As an adult, he owned a .357 Magnum pistol for a quarter of a century for protection, although he eventually took it out of the house, and then got rid of it entirely. Though he no longer owns guns, he continues to support the right to own guns to protect one's family. However, by 2013, the data on gun homicides, suicides, and accidental shootings convinced him that some modest gun control measures might be necessary.

== Awards and honors ==
- Fellow, 2001, Linnean Society of London
- California State University, Fullerton Distinguished Alumni Award, 2002
- NCAS Philip J. Klass Award, October 2006
- Honorary Doctorate of Humane Letters, Whittier College, 2008
- Independent Investigations Group, 10th Anniversary Gala award, 2010

== Bibliography ==
- Shermer, Michael (1985). Sport cycling: a guide to training, racing, and endurance. Internet Archive. Chicago: Contemporary Books. ISBN 978-0-8092-5244-2.
- Shermer, Michael (1987). Cycling: endurance and speed. Internet Archive. Chicago: Contemporary Books. ISBN 978-0-8092-4775-2.
- Shermer, Michael (1989). Teach your child science : making science fun for the both of you. Internet Archive. Los Angeles: Lowell House; Chicago: Contemporary Books. ISBN 978-0-929923-08-6.
- Benjamin, Arthur; Shermer, Michael (1994). Mathemagics: How to Look Like a Genius Without Really Trying. Lowell House. ISBN 978-1-56565-118-0.
- Benjamin, Arthur; Shermer, Michael B. (1996). Teach Your Child Math: Making Math Fun for the Both of You. Lowell House. ISBN 978-1-56565-481-5.
- Shermer, Michael (1997). Why People Believe Weird Things: Pseudoscience, Superstition, and Other Confusions of Our Time. Henry Holt and Company. ISBN 978-1-4299-9676-1.
- Shermer, Michael (2000). How We Believe: The Search for God in an Age of Science. Perfection Learning Corporation. ISBN 978-0-613-35413-4.
- Shermer, Michael; Grobman, Alex; Hertzberg, Arthur (2000). Denying History: Who Says the Holocaust Never Happened and why Do They Say It?. University of California Press. ISBN 978-0-520-21612-9.
- Shermer, Michael (2002). The Borderlands of Science: Where Sense Meets Nonsense. Oxford University Press. ISBN 978-0-19-515798-7.
- Shermer, Michael (2002). In Darwin's Shadow: The Life and Science of Alfred Russel Wallace: A Biographical Study on the Psychology of History. Oxford University Press. ISBN 978-0-19-992385-4.
- Shermer, Michael; Linse, Pat, eds. (2002). The Skeptic Encyclopedia of Pseudoscience. ABC-CLIO. ISBN 978-1-57607-653-8.
- Shermer, Michael; McFarland, Dennis (2004). The Science of Good and Evil: Why People Cheat, Gossip, Care, Share, and Follow the Golden Rule. Macmillan. ISBN 978-0-8050-7520-5.
- Shermer, Michael (2005). Science Friction: Where the Known Meets the Unknown. Macmillan. ISBN 978-0-8050-7708-7.
- Benjamin, Arthur; Shermer, Michael (2006). Secrets of Mental Math. Internet Archive. Three Rivers Press. ISBN 978-0-307-33840-2.
- Shermer, Michael (2006). Why Darwin Matters: The Case Against Intelligent Design. Macmillan. ISBN 978-0-8050-8121-3.
- Shermer, Michael (2007). The Mind of the Market: Compassionate Apes, Competitive Humans, and Other Tales from Evolutionary Economics. Macmillan. ISBN 978-1-4299-2443-6.
- Shermer, Michael (2011). The believing brain : from ghosts and gods to politics and conspiracies – how we construct beliefs and reinforce them as truths. Internet Archive. New York: Times Books. ISBN 978-0-8050-9125-0.
- Shermer, Michael (2015). The Moral Arc: How Science and Reason Lead Humanity Toward Truth, Justice, and Freedom. Macmillan. ISBN 978-0-8050-9691-0.
- Shermer, Michael (2016). Skeptic: Viewing the World with a Rational Eye. Macmillan. ISBN 978-1-62779-138-0.
- Shermer, Michael (2018). Heavens on Earth: The Scientific Search for the Afterlife, Immortality, and Utopia. Henry Holt and Company. ISBN 978-1-62779-857-0.
- Shermer, Michael (2020). Giving the Devil His Due: Reflections of a Scientific Humanist. Cambridge University Press. ISBN 978-1-108-48978-2.
- Shermer, Michael (2022). Conspiracy – Why the Rational Believe the Irrational. Johns Hopkins University Press. ISBN 978-1421444451.
- Shermer, Michael (2026). Truth: What It Is, How to Find It, and Why It Still Matters. Johns Hopkins University Press. ISBN 978-1421453729.
