= Multi-directional Impact Protection System =

Safety technology

MIPS (Multi-directional Impact Protection System) is a head-protection system designed to enhance the safety of various helmets. MIPS is a thin, low-friction layer installed on the inside of a helmet. In case of a crash, the MIPS layer allows the head to turn or slide 10–15 mm (up to half an inch) inside the helmet. This sliding reduces the internal rotational motion in the head, which decreases the risk of concussions and other brain injuries.

MIPS is the best-known brand among modern technologies aimed at minimizing rotational impact to the brain, but not the only one. The MIPS technology was developed by specialists at the KTH Royal Institute of Technology and a brain surgeon at the Karolinska Institute in Stockholm, Sweden, in 1996. The company licenses their products to helmet manufacturers.

MIPS is not a certification or testing system.

== Rotational motion ==
Rotational motion is the result of the brain continuing to move or stretch after the head has come to a quick and sudden stop following an angled impact.

In a helmet equipped with the MIPS safety system, a low-friction layer allows the helmet to slide relative to the head, resulting in a reduction of the rotational motion that may otherwise be transmitted to the brain. In this way, the MIPS approach mimics the natural safety system of the human head.

== History ==
Together with Royal Institute of Technology researcher Peter Halldin, Hans von Holst developed a technology that was designed to provide more effective protection against brain trauma. To evaluate the risk of different types of head injuries and to simulate impacts where a person is wearing a helmet, they used the Finite Element Model, developed by Svein Kleiven, Professor at Sweden’s Royal Institute of Technology (KTH). After thoroughly evaluating the brain anatomy, physiology, and combining their years of testing and expertise, von Holst and Halldin produced what is now known as the MIPS Brain Protection System, a technology that mimics the brain’s own protective structure.

The company MIPS AB was founded in 2001 by five specialists in the biomechanics of the KTH Royal Institute of Technology. Following its inception in 2001, MIPS AB evolved from concept to product, introducing the technology in an equestrian helmet 2007. At that time MIPS had their own helmet model but they changed their business model to be an ingredient brand, offering their product to existing helmet brands. As MIPS grew internationally, it debuted the ‘Yellow Dot’ branding in 2009.

In 2010, MIPS AB expanded into the bike and snow helmet industries, gaining widespread acceptance as both the technology, and awareness of head trauma became increasingly recognized in similarly risky sports.

In early 2014, one of the world’s largest helmet manufacturers, BRG Sports, Inc. and MIPS AB entered into a formal partnership after several years of sharing their technology, offering MIPS’ technology to a much wider global audience. Since then, MIPS AB has added several new brands to its catalog and has expanded to the American, European and Chinese markets.

In 2019, the founders Peter Halldin, Hans von Holst and Svein Kleiven received the Polhem Prize, the oldest and most prestigious technical Swedish award.

== See also ==
- Automatic emergency call, fall or crash detection
