= Bicycle helmet =

Type of helmet

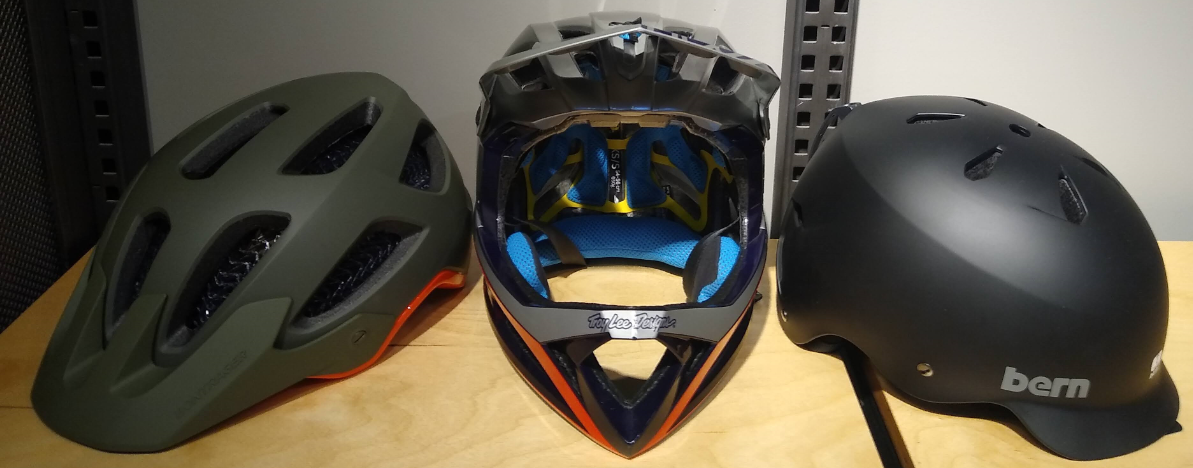
Three styles of bicycle helmets: standard, full-face, and multi-sport

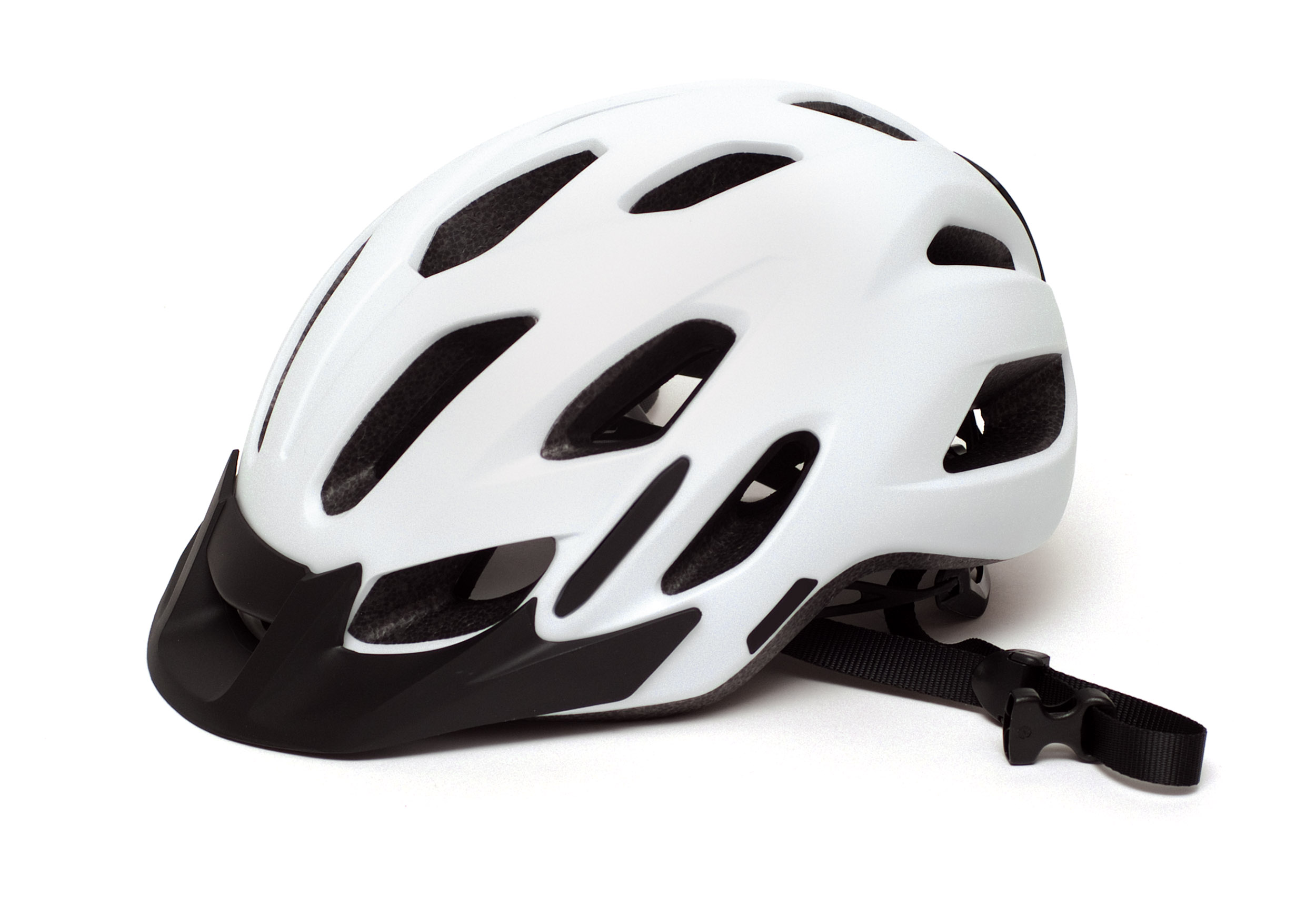
A typical bicycle helmet

A bicycle helmet is a type of helmet designed to attenuate impacts to the head of a cyclist in collisions while minimizing side effects such as interference with peripheral vision.

== History ==
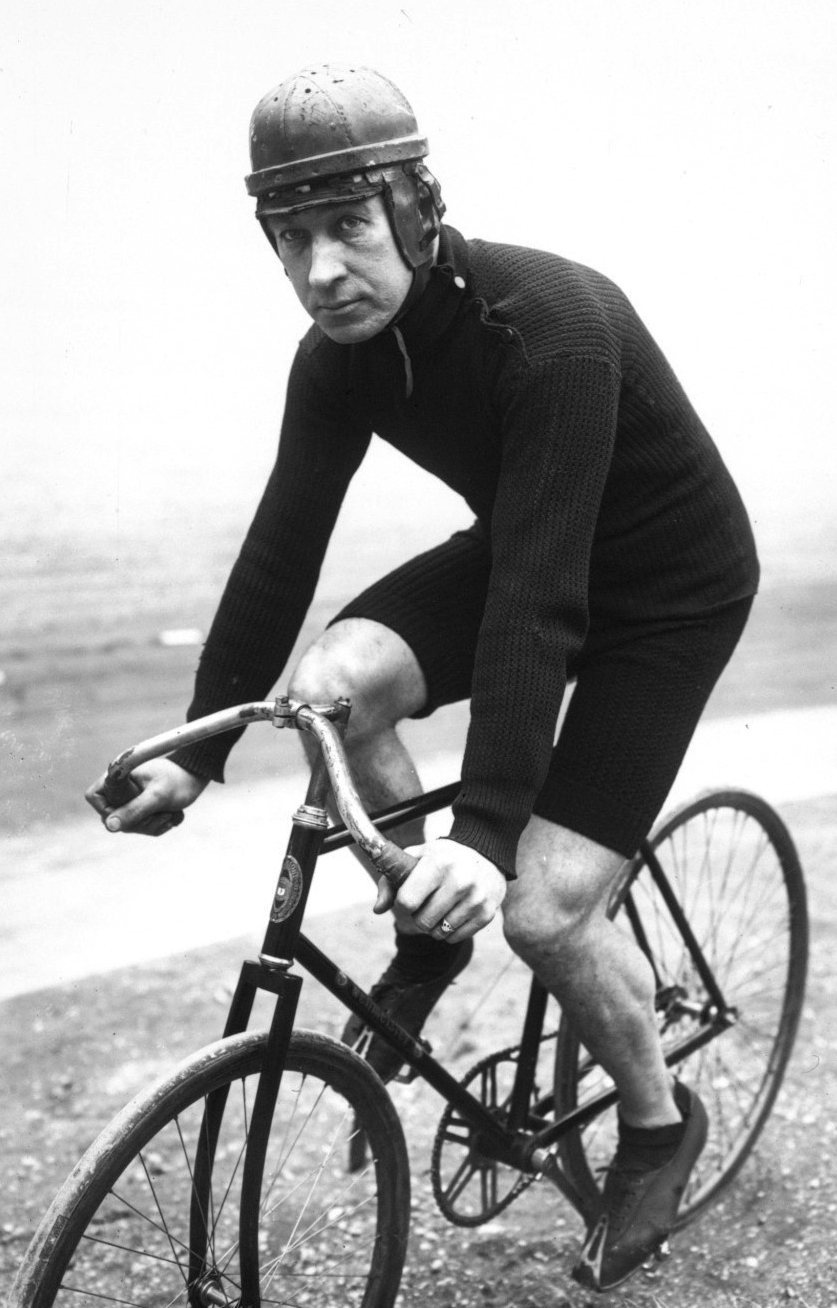
Nat Butler, 1910

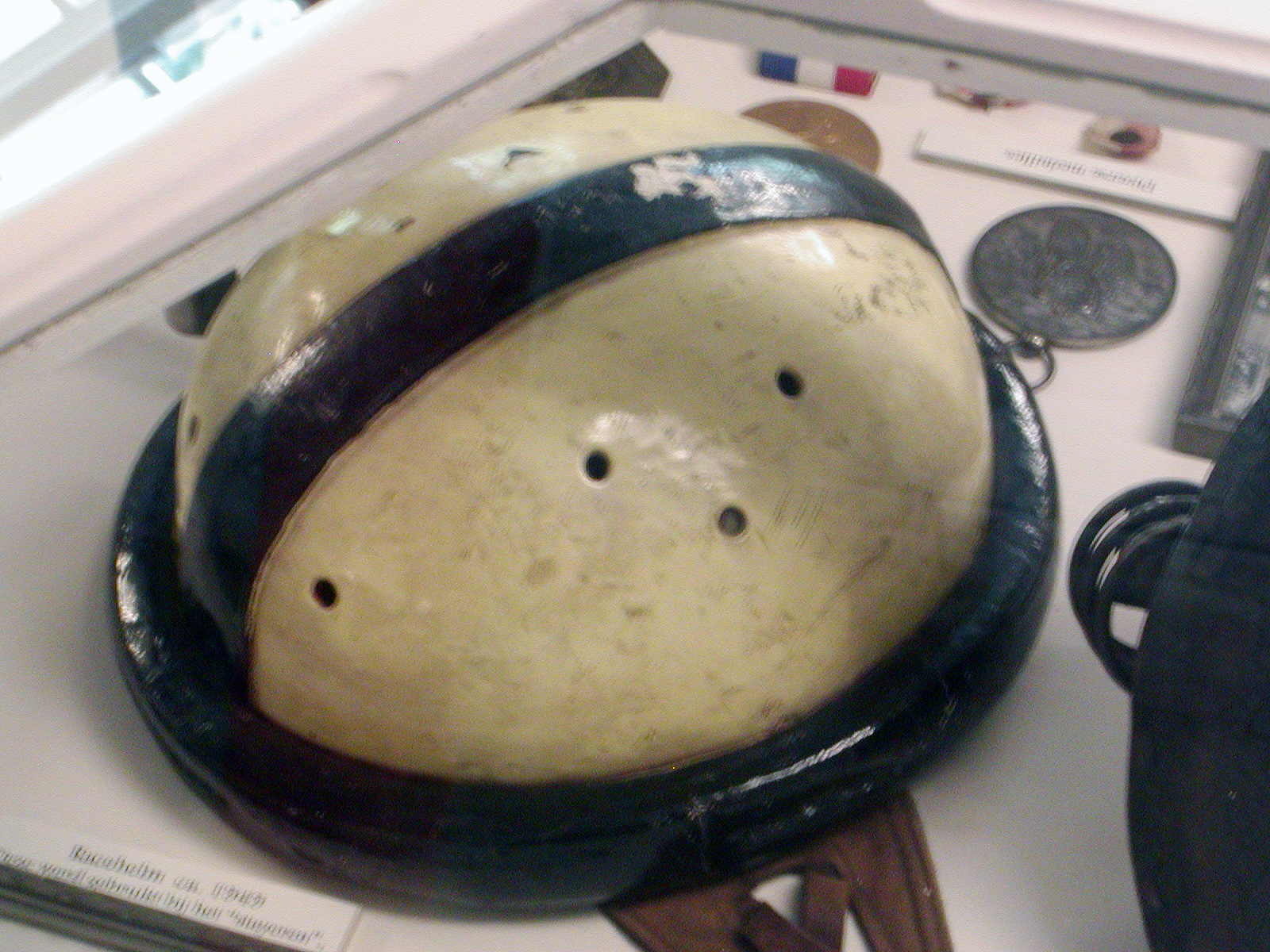
Bicycle helmet, 1940s

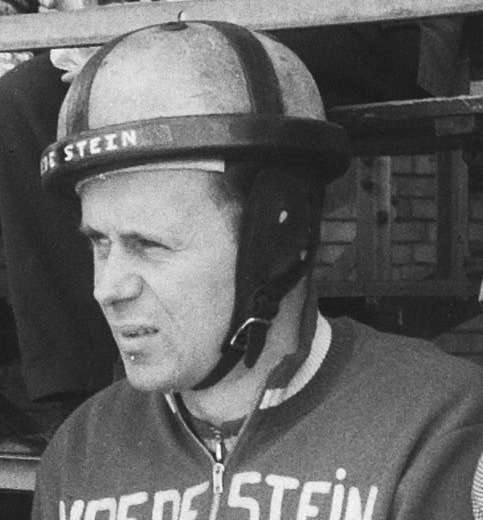
Martin Wierstra (NED), 1959

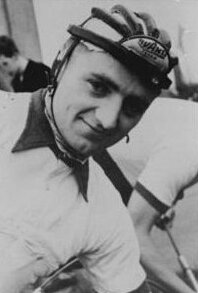
Bernhard Eckstein, 1960

=== History of designs ===
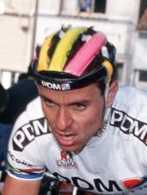
Uwe Raab wearing a "hairnet" helmet

A cycle helmet should generally be light in weight and provide ample ventilation because cycling can be an intense aerobic activity which significantly raises body temperature, and the head in particular needs to be able to regulate its temperature. The dominant form of the helmet up to the 1970s was the "hairnet" style, an open construction made of rubber bars covered in leather. This offered acceptable protection from scrapes and cuts, but only minimal impact protection, and was mainly used by racing cyclists.

More widespread use of helmets began in the US in the 1970s. After many decades when bicycles were regarded largely as children's toys, many American adults took up cycling during and after the bike boom of the 1970s. Two of the first modern bicycle helmets were made by MSR, a manufacturer of mountaineering equipment, and Bell Sports, a manufacturer of helmets for auto racing and motorcycles. These helmets were a spin-off from the development of expanded polystyrene foam liners for motorcycling and motorsport helmets and had hard polycarbonate plastic shells. The bicycle helmet arm of Bell was split off in 1991 as Bell Sports Inc., having completely overtaken the motorcycle and motorsports helmet business.

The first commercially successful purpose-designed bicycle helmet was the Bell Biker, a polystyrene-lined hard shell released in 1975. At the time there was no appropriate standard; the only applicable one, from Snell, would be passed only by a light open-face motorcycle helmet. Over time the design was refined and by 1983 Bell were making the V1-Pro, the first polystyrene helmet intended for racing use. In 1984 Bell produced the Lil Bell Shell, a no-shell children's helmet. These early helmets had little ventilation.

In 1985, Snell B85 was introduced, the first widely adopted standard for bicycle helmets; this has subsequently been refined into B90 and B95 (see Standards below). At this time helmets were almost all either hard-shell or no-shell (perhaps with a vacuum-formed plastic cover). Ventilation was still minimal due mainly to technical limitations of the foams and shells in use.

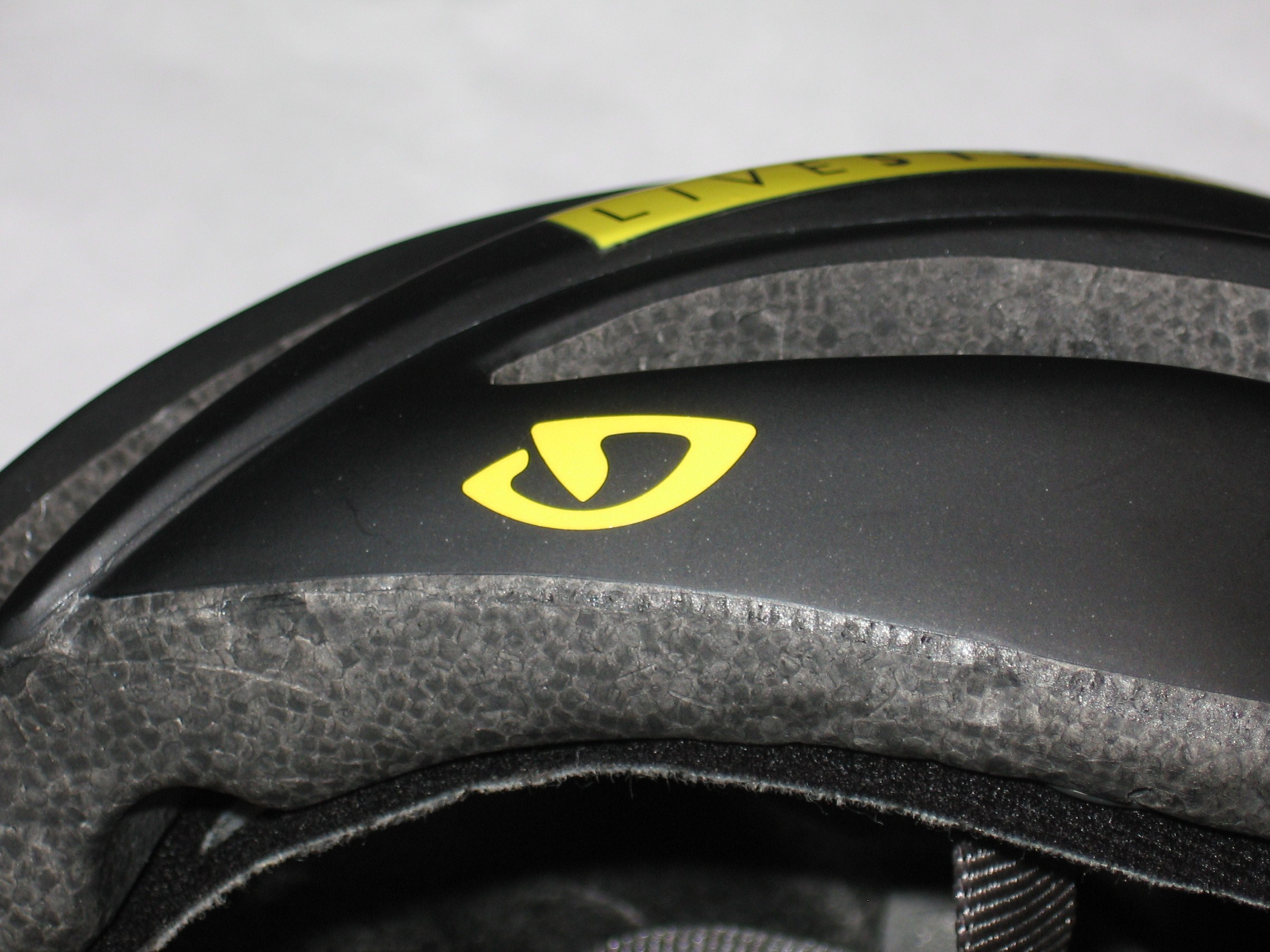
A Giro Atmos helmet, showing seamless in-mould micro shell construction

Around 1990 a new construction technique was invented: in-mould micro shell. A very thin shell was incorporated during the moulding process. This rapidly became the dominant technology, allowing for larger vents and more complex shapes than hard shells.

Use of hard shells declined rapidly among the general cyclist population during the 1990s, almost disappearing from road and cross country mountain bike helmets by the end of the decade, but remaining popular with BMX riders and more aggressive mountain bike disciplines such as downhill riding.

The late 1990s and early 2000s saw advances in retention and fitting systems, with cradles which adjust precisely to the rider's head, replacing the old system of varying thickness pads. This resulted in the back of the head being less covered by the helmet, although more recent designs have largely addressed this.

Since more advanced helmets began being used in the Tour de France, carbon fiber inserts are often used to increase strength and protection of the helmet. The Giro Atmos and Ionos, as well as the Bell Alchera, were among the first to use carbon fiber, MET Helmets furthered the use of carbon fibre by in-moulding a complete cage during manufacturing.

Some modern road and track racing bicycle helmets have a long tapering back end for streamlining. This type of helmet is mainly dedicated to time trial racing and Triathlon as they lack significant ventilation, making them uncomfortable for long races.

=== History of standards ===
In the United States the Snell Memorial Foundation, an organisation initially established to create standards for motorcycle and auto racing helmets, implemented one of the first standards, since updated. Snell's standard includes testing of random samples. In 1990 the Consumers' Association (UK) market survey showed that around 90% of helmets on sale were Snell B90 certified. By their 1998 survey, the number of Snell certified helmets was around zero. There are two main types of helmet: hard shell and soft/micro shell (no-shell helmets are now rare). Hard shells declined rapidly among the general cyclist population over this period, almost disappearing by the end of the decade, but remained more popular with BMX riders as well as inline skaters and skateboarders.

The American National Standards Institute (ANSI) created a standard called ANSI Z80.4 in 1984. Later, the United States Consumer Product Safety Commission (CPSC) created its own mandatory standard for all bicycle helmets sold in the United States, which took effect in March 1999.

In the European Union (EU) the currently applicable standards are EN 1078:1997 and EN 1080:1997.

An additional and voluntary standard was created by Swedish medical professionals. MIPS-compliant helmets are intended to reduce rotational violence to the brain caused by angled impacts.

In Australia and New Zealand, the current legally required standard is AS/NZS 2063. A 2004 report concluded that the performance requirements of the 1996 version of this standard was slightly less strict than the Snell B95 standard but incorporated a quality assurance requirement, making it arguably safer.

=== Design intentions and standards ===
The standards are intended to reduce acceleration to (and within) the head due to impact, as a stiff liner made of expanded polystyrene is crushed against the head. However, both the CPSC and the EN 1078 standards only look at linear accelerations and ignore rotational accelerations. The rotational accelerations that arise in bicycle accidents can be large enough to cause concussions, diffuse axonal injury and subdural haematoma. A few new helmets are designed to reduce rotational accelerations in accidents.

It is important that a helmet fit the cyclist properly – in one study of children and adolescents aged 4 to 18 years, 96% were found to be incorrectly fitted. Efficacy of incorrectly fitted helmets is reckoned to be much lower; one estimate states that risk is increased almost twofold.

== History of use ==
Helmets use varies greatly between populations and between groups. Downhill mountain bikers and amateur sportive cyclists normally wear helmets, and helmet use is enforced in professional cycle sport and in a few legal jurisdictions. Utility cyclists and children are much less likely to wear helmets unless compelled.

=== Required helmet use in cycling sport ===
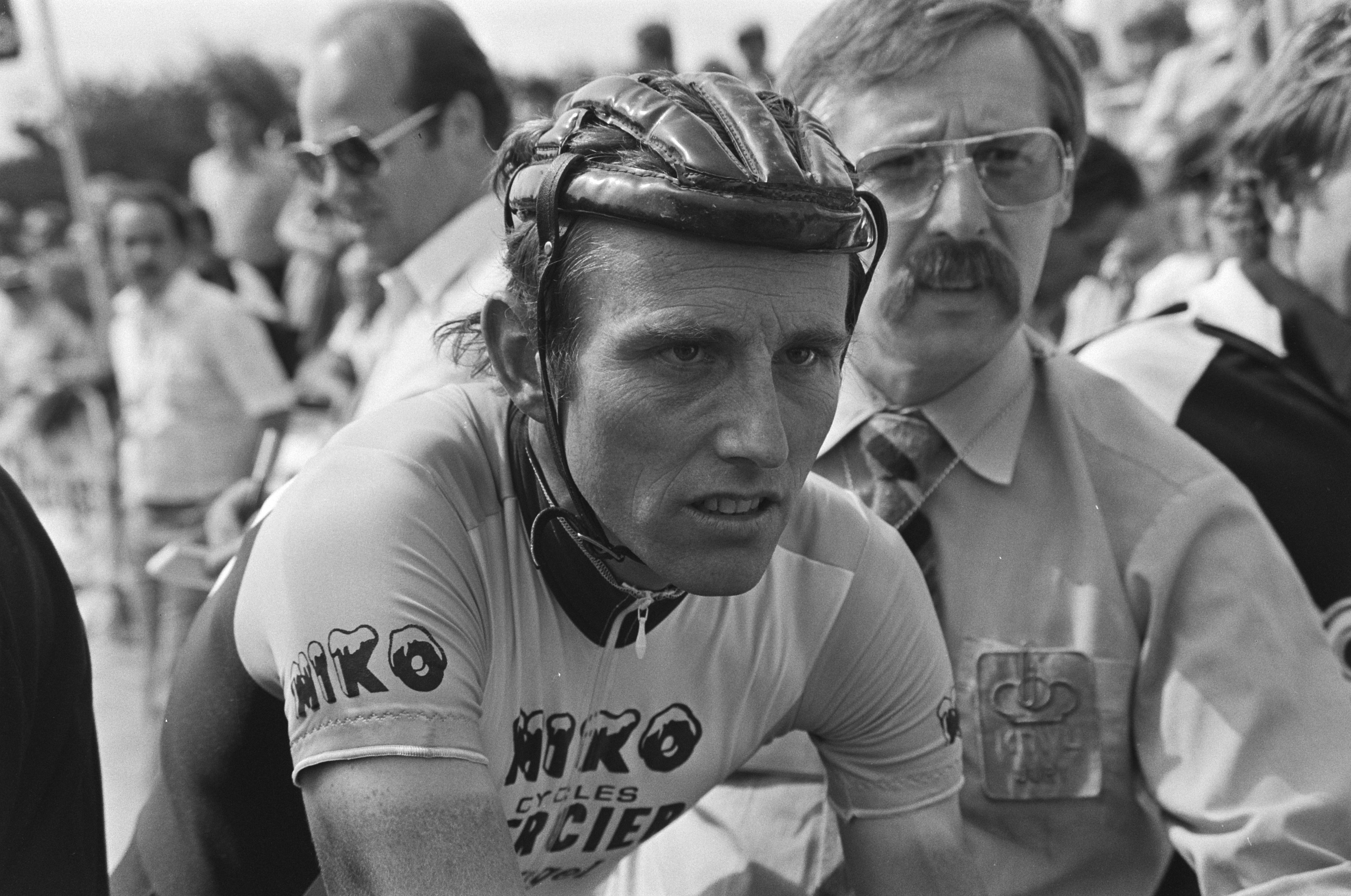
Joop Zoetemelk in 1979

Historically, road cycling regulations set by the sport's ruling body, Union Cycliste Internationale (UCI), did not require helmet use, leaving the matter to individual preferences and local traffic laws. The majority of professional cyclists chose not to wear helmets, citing discomfort and claiming that helmet weight would put them in a disadvantage during uphill sections of the race.

The first serious attempt by the UCI to introduce compulsory helmet use was 1991 Paris–Nice race, which resulted in a riders' strike, and UCI abandoned the idea.

While voluntary helmet use in professional ranks rose somewhat in the 1990s, the turning point in helmet policy was the March 2003 death of Andrei Kivilev at the Paris–Nice. The new rules were introduced on 5 May 2003, with the 2003 Giro d'Italia being the first major race affected. The 2003 rules allowed for discarding the helmets during final climbs of at least 5 kilometres in length; subsequent revisions made helmet use mandatory at all times.

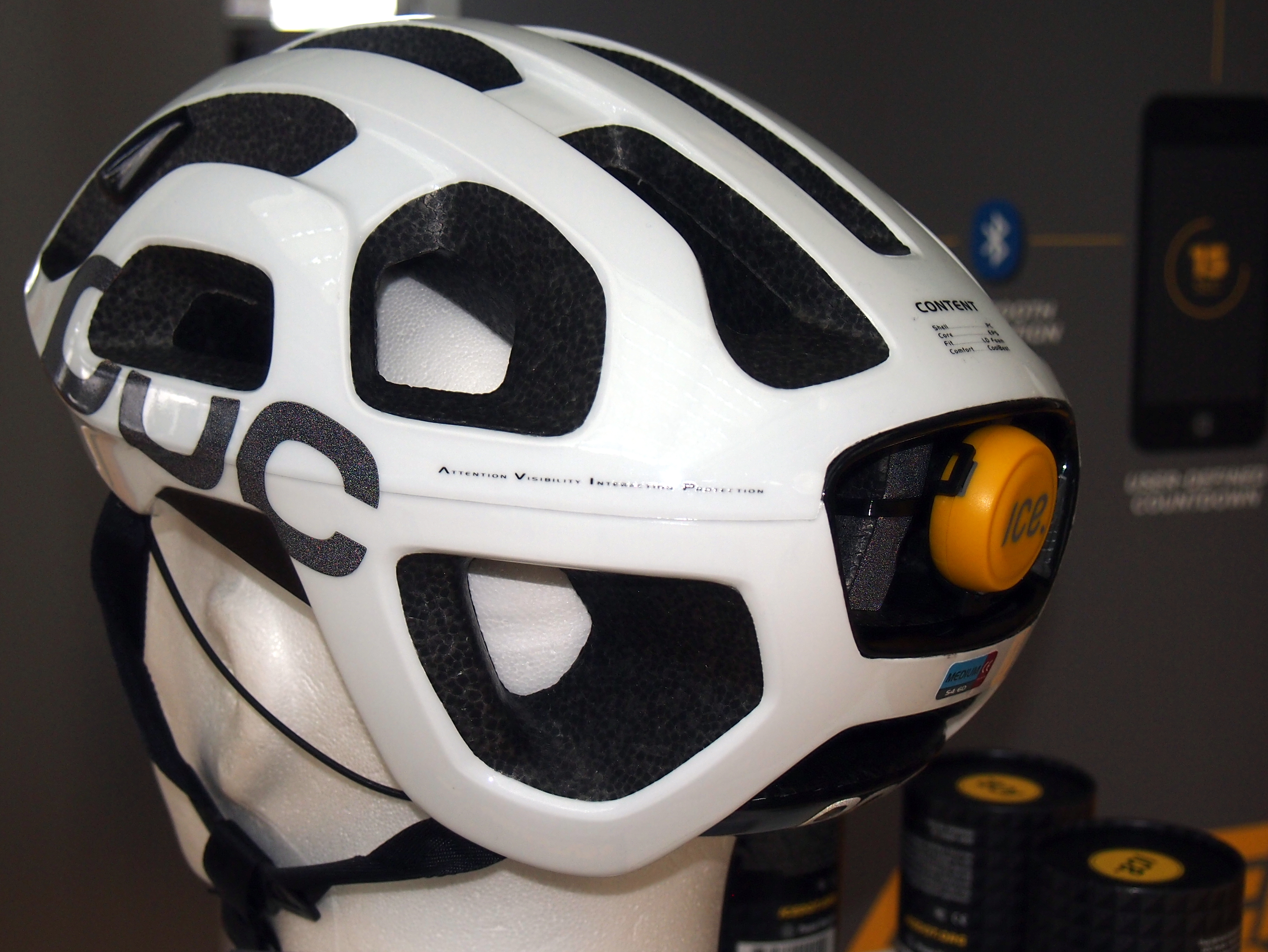
Example of shock detector in bicycle helmet to signal when a crash has occurred

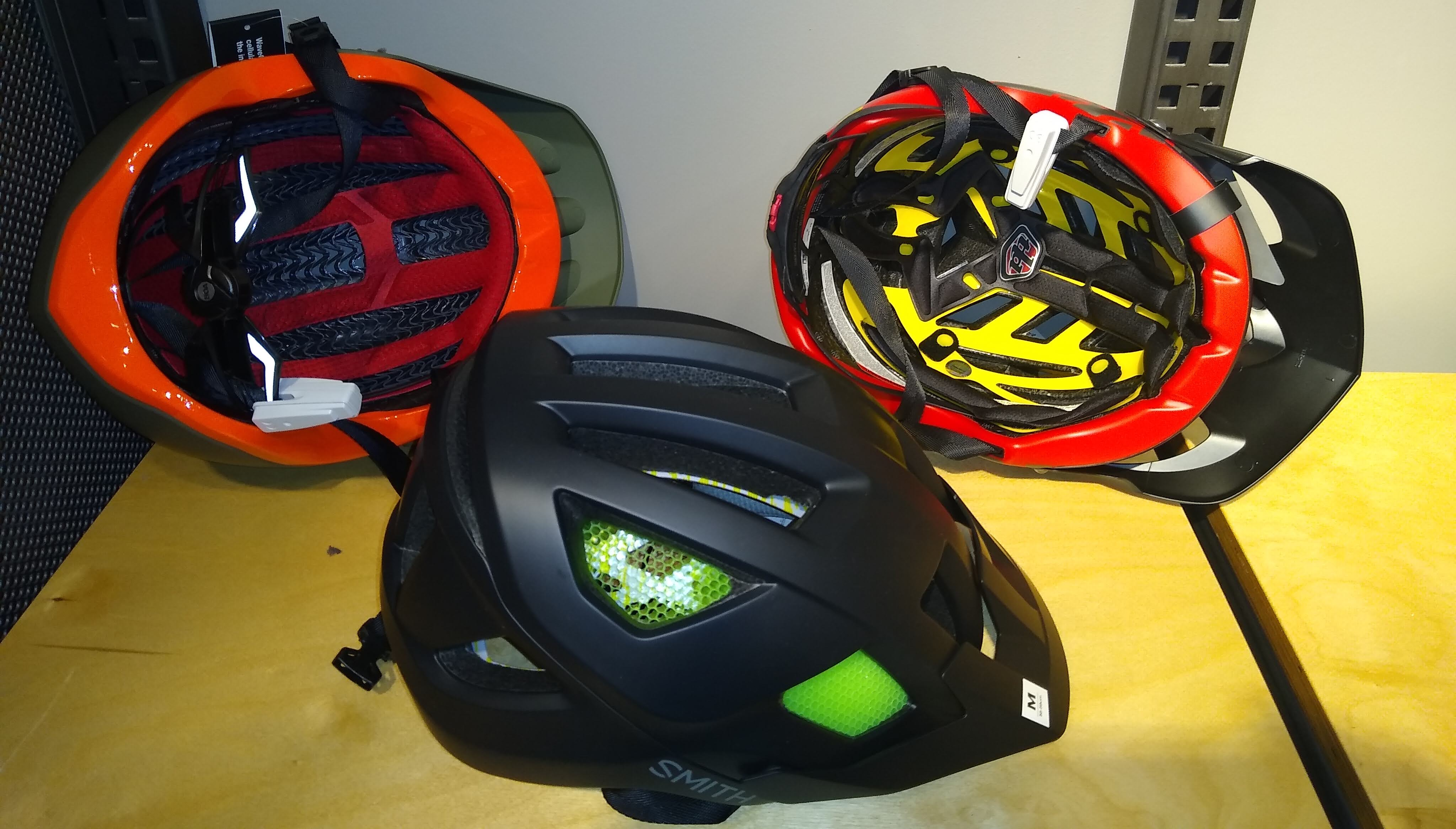
Types of modern bicycle helmet design technologies. Energy absorbing Bontrager Wavecell (left) and Smith Koroyd (center); MIPS (right)

=== Injury reduction ===
There is consistent scientific evidence that bicycle helmets reduce the severity of head injuries, particularly serious injuries, in accidents, although they are less useful when a motor vehicle is involved.

=== Health benefits of cycling ===
Studies from China, Denmark, the Netherlands and the United Kingdom show that regular cyclists live longer because the health effects far outweigh the risk of crashes. A reduction in the number of cyclists is likely to harm the health of the population more than any possible protection from injury. UK figures show that it takes at least 8,000 years of average cycling to produce one clinically severe head injury and 22,000 years for one death. De Jong developed a mathematical model to evaluate the health-risk trade-offs of all-age mandatory helmet laws, if they were to be introduced in various North American and Western European countries. He concluded that helmet laws appear to offer net health benefit only in those countries with more dangerous bicycling environments under optimistic assumptions of the efficacy of helmets. Newbold suggested improvements to the De Jong model, and, using published cycling statistics for the United States in his revised model, found that mandatory bicycle helmet laws would seem to have positive net public health benefits there. However, Newbold stressed that there were many parameters to these models which require further research to properly quantitate, and that results should be considered provisional rather than definitive.

Some researchers have suggested that a legal requirement to wear helmets there may have dissuaded people from cycling, and that repeal of these laws could lead to increased cycling. This suggestion has been criticised. (Note: Hagel et al. 2006: "Confounding variables may also influence both the exposure and outcome variables in the context of a time series or ecological study. For example, a fall in the number of bicyclists in the 1990s may simply reflect an increase in in-line skating or other recreational activities... Without evidence that those who allegedly stopped cycling rode enough to confer a heart health benefit or that they did not take up another healthy activity in its place, Robinson cannot conclude that decreases in cycling are harmful to health and her argument crumbles.") Fewer cyclists might lead to increased risks per cyclist due to the "safety in numbers" effect. This means that if the number of cyclists on the road doubles, then the average individual cyclist can ride for an additional 50 percent of the time without increasing the probability of being struck. It is thought that the increased frequency of motorist-cyclist interaction creates more aware motorists.

=== Risk compensation ===
It has been hypothesised that the wearing of helmets may make cyclists feel safer and thus take more risks. This hypothetical effect is known as risk compensation or risk homeostasis. Some authors have suggested that risk compensation occurs with other road safety interventions such as seat belts and anti-lock braking systems, but these views are disputed by other road safety experts.

A Spanish study of traffic accidents between 1990 and 1999 found that helmeted cyclists involved in accidents were less likely to have committed a traffic law violation than unhelmeted cyclists, and that helmeted cyclists were no more likely to have committed a speeding violation in association with the accident than unhelmeted cyclists. The authors concluded that "although the findings do not support the existence of a strong risk compensation mechanism among helmeted cyclists, this possibility cannot be ruled out".

In one experimental study, adults accustomed to wearing helmets cycled more slowly without a helmet, but no difference in helmeted and unhelmeted cycling speed was found for cyclists who do not usually wear helmets. An experimental study found that children navigating an obstacle course on foot went faster and took more risks when wearing safety gear (including helmets). A telephone interview study found that in hypothetical scenarios of their children wearing protective equipment or not, parents' ratings of permissible risk for their children was higher if protective gear was hypothetically worn.

Motorists may also alter their behaviour toward helmeted cyclists. One study by Walker in England found that 2500 vehicles passed a helmeted cyclist with measurably less clearance (8.5 cm less) than that given to the same cyclist unhelmeted (out of an average total passing distance of 1.2 to 1.3 metres). An initial re-analysis of these data by other investigators agreed that with the 8.5 cm finding, but argued that there were not more "close passes" (which they defined as under 1 metre of clearance). In 2018, Walker published a rebuttal, arguing that there were more passes under 1.5 m (the legal minimum distance in Spain and Germany) or 2 m, and there was not enough evidence to say there weren't more passes at under 1 m.

In 1988, Rodgers reanalyzed data which supposedly showed helmets to be effective; after correcting data errors and methodological weaknesses, he concluded that "bicycle-related fatalities are positively and significantly associated with increased helmet use". He mentioned risk compensation as one possible explanation of this association.

=== Counterfeits ===
With fake "knock-off" products of inferior quality and durability increasingly appearing for sale online, many direct from China, consumers are warned to be suspicious of prices that seem too good to be true, and to purchase helmets from reputable local or online sellers. The main target markets seem to be the US and Europe, with 90 percent of US counterfeit seizures coming from Hong Kong and China.

=== Accidents from wearing at inappropriate times ===
The U.S. Consumer Product Safety Commission (CPSC) has warned that children should not wear bike helmets while using playground equipment, or any time when they are not biking, because of the risk of strangulation by the helmet strap should the helmet or strap be caught in playground equipment, a tree being climbed, and so on. European Standard EN 1080, which uses a weak retention system designed to open under load, was published in 1997 to address this problem. Such helmets are not intended for use anywhere motor vehicles are present. To avoid serious accidents, parents and carers should take care to ensure that children do not wear bicycle helmets during unsupervised play, or when using climbing equipment.

== Debate over compulsion or strong promotion ==
=== Supporters ===
The National Health Service of the United Kingdom lists wearing a helmet as one of its "cycling safety tips" for beginners, and it states "wearing a cycling helmet can help prevent a head injury if you fall from your bike". The American Medical Association Medical Student Section has stated that "helmet use is an effective public health intervention".

A number of cycling advocacy organisations support helmet use or legislation. The League of American Bicyclists "has encouraged the wearing of helmets via its publications and its education program for many years. Since 1991 the League has required participants in League-sponsored events to wear helmets." However, the League opposes mandatory helmet laws, arguing they "may hurt bicyclist safety overall by discouraging bicycling, by promoting the idea that it is an unsafe activity or by raising a barrier to transportation choice". Bicycle Network, Australia's largest bike riding organisation, previously supported the helmet legislation, but is no longer supporting a mandate. Bicycle Queensland supports helmet laws, noting that "ample research shows the safety benefits of wearing helmets surpasses the no-helmet personal-freedom argument".

Numerous health medical groups support helmet laws. These include the World Health Organization, the British Medical Association, the American Medical Association, the American College of Emergency Physicians, the Canadian Paediatric Society, the Canadian Academy of Sport and Exercise Medicine, and the Royal Australasian College of Surgeons.

The Centers for Disease Control and Prevention, the American Academy of Pediatrics and the (British) Royal Society for the Prevention of Accidents recommend wearing helmets. Safety groups Safe Kids USA and the National Safety Council urge helmet wearing. SWOV (the Dutch Institute for Road Safety Research) recommends helmet use. Temple University's Public Health Law Research program classifies bicycle helmets laws as an "effective" public health intervention, based on a review of scholarly research. The British National Children's Bureau supports and promotes helmet use.

=== Opponents ===
Dorothy Robinson reviewed data from jurisdictions where helmet use increased following legislation, and concluded that helmet laws did not demonstrably reduce cyclists' head injuries. Mayer Hillman, a transport and road safety analyst from the UK, does not support the use of helmets, reasoning that they are of very limited value in the event of a collision with a car, that risk compensation negates their protective effect and because he feels their promotion implicitly shifts responsibility of care to the cyclist. He also cautions against placing the recommendations of surgeons above other expert opinion in the debate, comparing it to drawing conclusions on whether it is worthwhile to buy lottery tickets by sampling only a group of prizewinners. The prominent UK-based cycling activist John Franklin is skeptical of the merits of helmets, regarding proactive measures including bike maintenance and riding skills as being more important. Cyclists' representative groups complain that focus on helmets diverts attention from other issues which are much more important for improving bicycle safety, such as road danger reduction, training, roadcraft, and bicycle maintenance.

In 1998 the European Cyclists' Federation (ECF) adopted a position paper rejecting compulsory helmet laws as being likely to have greater negative rather than positive health effects. The UK's largest cyclists' organisation, Cycling UK, believes that the "overall health effects of compulsory helmets are negative." The Dutch Fietsersbond (Cyclists' Union) summarised existing evidence and concluded that a compulsory helmet law (for utility cyclists) would have a negative impact on population health: "Helmet laws save a few brains, but destroy a lot of hearts". No policy position was provided for other types of cycling, particular mountain biking (MTB) and all forms of on- and off-road cycle sports.

Cycling Action Network (New Zealand) policy states "There is evidence that mandatory cycle helmet wearing legislation is not working as intended and should be reviewed. Priority needs to be given to other safety issues such as motorist behaviour and roading improvements."

=== Legislation and culture ===
The following countries have mandatory helmet laws, in at least one jurisdiction, for either minors only, or for all riders: Australia, Canada, Czech Republic, Finland, Iceland, New Zealand, Sweden, and the United States. Spain requires helmets on interurban routes. In the US, 21 states have statewide mandatory helmet laws for minors of varying ages, and 37 states have mandatory helmet laws for varying age groups in varying jurisdictions. Nearly 9 in 10 American adults support helmet laws for children. Israel's helmet law was never enforced or obeyed, and the adult element has been revoked; Mexico City has repealed its helmet law.

In 2004, a Bill proposing to make the wearing of bicycle helmets compulsory came before the UK Parliament, and was defeated. Horton observed: "The 2004 Parliamentary Bill was unanimously opposed by the cycling establishment, with every major cycling organisation and magazine rejecting helmet compulsion." A 2016 Irish postage stamp originally depicting a cyclist with helmet and hi-vis vest was altered to remove those after Cycling Ireland complained that it would discourage people from taking up cycling.

Although a causal link is not proven, it is observed that the countries with the best cycle safety records (Denmark and the Netherlands) have among the lowest levels of helmet use. Their bicycle safety record is generally attributed to public awareness and understanding of cyclists, safety in numbers, education, and cycling infrastructure. A study of cycling in major streets of Boston, Paris and Amsterdam illustrates the variation in cycling culture: Boston had far higher rates of helmet-wearing (32% of cyclists, versus 2.4% in Paris and 0.1% in Amsterdam), Amsterdam had far more cyclists (242 passing bicycles per hour, versus 74 in Paris and 55 in Boston). Cycle helmet wearing rates in the Netherlands and Denmark are very low. An Australian journalist writes: "Rarities in Amsterdam seem to be stretch-fabric-clad cyclists and fat cyclists. Helmets are non-existent, and when people asked me where I was from, they would grimace and mutter: "Ah, yes, helmet laws." These had gained international notoriety on a par with our deadly sea animals. Despite the lack of helmets, cycling in the Netherlands is safer than in any other country, and the Dutch have one-third the number of cycling fatalities (per 100,000 people) that Australia has." Cycling UK say that cycling in the Netherlands and Denmark is perceived as a "normal" activity requiring no special clothing or equipment. Pucher and Buehler state: "The Dutch cycling experts and planners interviewed for this paper adamantly opposed the use of helmets, claiming that helmets discourage cycling by making it less convenient, less comfortable, and less fashionable. They also mention the possibility that helmets would make cycling more dangerous by giving cyclists a false sense of safety and thus encouraging riskier riding behavior."

== See also ==
- Bicycle helmet laws
- Bicycle helmet laws by country
- Bicycle helmets in Australia
- Bicycle helmets in New Zealand
- Bicycle safety
- Closed head injury
- Motorcycle safety
  - ATGATT
