= Alex Grobman =

American historian

Alex Grobman is an American historian.

== Biography ==
Grobman grew up in Camden, New Jersey, the son of a pharmacist and a synagogue secretary. He earned his PhD at the Hebrew University of Jerusalem.

Grobman's book Denying History has been described as serving to "remind us the past is not entirely negotiable" that, "Good historians can uncover and explain the past with provisional certainty - if they account for personal and cultural bias, and that it can be established beyond any reasonable doubt that the holocaust was real.

According to CNN ". . . Shermer and Grobman do more than just refute ridiculous allegations. They also use the example of Holocaust denial literature to examine free speech issues, the psychology of right-wing extremists, and the role of biases in historical research."

Grobman is Jewish.

== Books ==
- Rekindling the Flame: American Jewish Chaplains and the Survivors of European Jewry, 1944-1948. 1993
- Denying History: Who Says the Holocaust Never Happened, and Why Do They Say It?, with Michael Shermer, 2000
- Battling For Souls: The Vaad Hatzala Rescue Committee in Post-War Europe, 2004
- Nations United: How The UN Undermines Israel and the West 2006
- The Palestinian Right to Israel, 2010
