= EN 1078 =

European standard for bicycle helmets, etc

EN 1078, entitled Helmets for pedal cyclists and for users of skateboards and roller skates, is a European standard published in 1997. It is the basis of the identical British Standard BS EN 1078:1997. Compliance with this standard is one way of complying with the requirements of the European Personal Protective Equipment Directive (PPE; 89/686/EEC).

The standard was revised in 2012, and then amended the same year, into the EN 1078:2012+A1:2012 standard. This again was the basis of the identical British standard BS EN 1078:2012+A1:2012.

EN 1078 specifies requirements and test methods for bicycle helmets, skateboard and roller skate helmets. It covers helmet construction including field of vision, shock absorbing properties, retention system properties including chin strap and fastening devices, as well as marking and information.

The standard's key features are:

- Test anvils: Flat and kerbstone
- Drop apparatus: Guided free fall
- Impact velocity, energy or drop height flat anvil: 5.42–5.52 m/s
- Impact energy criteria: < 250g
- Roll-off test: Yes
- Retention system strength: Force applied dynamically. Helmet supported on headform.

A derived standard, EN 1080, covers helmets for young children. It addresses problems associated with the strangulation of children playing while wearing helmets.
