= Science Friction (book) =

Book by Michael Shermer

Science Friction: Where the Known Meets the Unknown
- Cover of the first edition
- Author: Michael Shermer
- Language: English
- Subjects: Science; Pseudoscience
- Publisher: Times Books
- Publication date: December 9, 2004
- Publication place: United States
- Media type: Print (Hardcover and Paperback)
- ISBN: 0-8050-7708-1
- OCLC: 55682384
- Dewey Decimal: 501 22
- LC Class: Q175 .S53437 2005
- Preceded by: The Science of Good and Evil
- Followed by: Why Darwin Matters

Science Friction: Where the Known Meets the Unknown is a 2004 book by Michael Shermer, a historian of science and founder of The Skeptics Society. It contains thirteen essays about "personal barriers and biases that plague and propel science, especially when scientists push against the unknown. What do we know, and what do we not know?" These include an essay relating the author's experience of a day spent learning cold reading techniques well enough to be accepted as a psychic. As well as covering skepticism and pseudoscience, Shermer discusses other topics touching on the subject of encouraging scientific thought, such as sport psychology and the writings of Stephen Jay Gould. Shermer attributes the founding of the skeptical movement to Martin Gardner's 1950 article "The Hermit Scientist" in the Antioch Review.
