= Denying History =

Book by Michael Shermer and Alex Grobman

Denying History: Who Says the Holocaust Never Happened and Why Do They Say It?
- Cover of the first edition
- Authors: Michael Shermer, Alex Grobman and Arthur Hertzberg
- Language: English
- Subject: Holocaust denial
- Publisher: University of California Press
- Publication date: May 3, 2002
- Publication place: United States
- Media type: Print (hardcover and paperback)
- Pages: 330
- ISBN: 0-520-23469-3
- OCLC: 43662082
- Preceded by: The Skeptic Encyclopedia of Pseudoscience
- Followed by: The Science of Good and Evil

Denying History: Who Says the Holocaust Never Happened and Why Do They Say It? is a 2002 book about Holocaust denial by Michael Shermer and Alex Grobman with collaboration of Arthur Hertzberg.

== Reviews ==
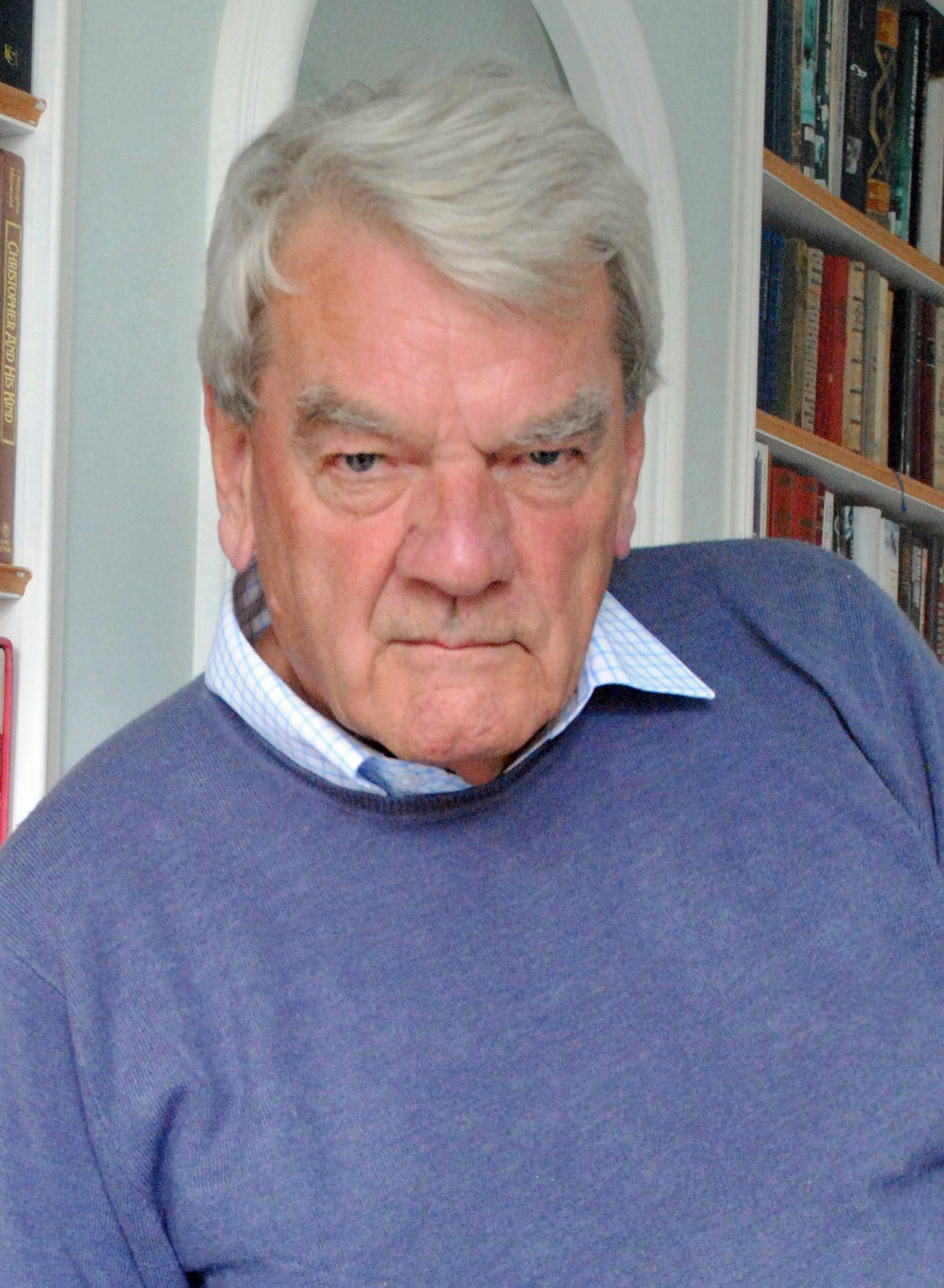
David Irving was one of the most prominent Holocaust deniers in the 1970s and 1980s

Publishers Weekly gave the book a positive review explaining, "Keeping their focus on larger questions about historical rigor and public memory, Shermer (a professor of the history of science at Occidental College and publisher of Skeptic magazine) and Grobman (Rekindling the Flame) look closely at the methods employed by deniers and those used by legitimate historians. "Holocaust denial," they argue, "is not just a Jewish issue. It is an attack on all history and the way we transmit the past to the future." Drawing on a wide array of evidence and interviews they conducted with famous deniers (including David Irving) and text from their Web sites and literature, the authors explore the difference between legitimate historical revisionism and pseudohistorical denial."

CNN wrote "... Shermer and Grobman do more than just refute ridiculous allegations. They also use the example of Holocaust denial literature to examine free speech issues, the psychology of right-wing extremists, and the role of biases in historical research." They further "reveal that Holocaust Denial is not skepticism, and that the revisionists are not being genuinely skeptical. Honest skepticism involves an inquisitive attitude which, as far as is humanly possible, is not marred by political or ethnic prejudices. Skepticism also involves a willingness to follow the evidence wherever it leads, rather than ignoring that which does not fit preconceived desires."

== Bibliography ==
- Shermer, Michael; Grobman, Alex; Hertzberg, Arthur (2009). Denying History: Who Says the Holocaust Never Happened and Why Do They Say It?. Oakland, California: University of California Press. ISBN 9780520944091.
