= Gender bias =

Tendency to prefer one gender over another

Gender bias is a societal concept in which one gender is preferred over another. It can be split into two main categories: implicit and explicit. Implicit gender bias is a form of unconscious bias, which occurs when an individual unconsciously attributes certain attitudes, stereotypes, or gender norms to another person or group of people. Explicit gender bias is a form of conscious bias, in which one intentionally places standards and expectations on another person or group of people based on their own personal beliefs.

== Origins of gender bias ==
The origins of gender bias come from a series of deeply rooted societal expectations for specific genders. These expectations differ between individual cultures, but often establish a set of behaviors in which certain genders are intended to follow. This develops into a series of societal stereotypes when it comes to gender, known as gender norms. These gender norms nurture an environment for gender bias, in which one believes a certain norm makes one gender better than another. This belief system is passed down from generation to generation, further cementing gender bias within a society. Despite shifting cultural norms and contemporary advancements, gender bias continues to persist amongst many modern societies as a result of these intergenerational and historical gender stereotypes.

== Relation to sexism ==
Gender bias is a broad term that refers to any bias based on gender, affecting all traditional and non-traditional gender norms and gender expressions. Gender bias has some relation to the concept of sexism, but both remain as distinct concepts. Sexism is a form of explicit bias, in which one is overtly discriminatory towards another person or group of people based on their sex. This is different from gender bias, which can be either implicit or explicit in terms of stereotypes and preferences.

== Gender bias in the workplace ==
Gender bias in the workplace is an extremely common occurrence. Gender bias leads to discrimination in hiring at all levels, with lower recruitment and job offer rates for women. Furthermore, there is a significant gap in salaries between men and women in the same positions. These behaviors stem from gender bias, in which society views women as less capable than men in the workplace. This is a result of an everlong societal portrayal of men as providers and women as nurturers.

== Gender bias in healthcare ==
Healthcare and medical treatment are additional societal experiences often influenced by gender bias. Preconceived societal perceptions of women's sensitivity and men's strength create gender norms as to how health issues are perceived, evaluated, and treated. This creates a disconnect between individual treatment for different genders, as gender norms establish a biased perspective on pain response and treatment efficiency.

== Gender bias around the globe ==
The concept of gender bias does not solely exist in Westernized societies. Global cultures in Africa, Asia, and South America experience a similar level of disparity between genders, resulting in a society that experiences gender bias. This is likely due to many cultures being rooted in viewing women as pure and nurturing, while men as strong and stoic. These concrete expectations for men and women have built societal structures that cause rifts in the treatment of different genders in the moden day, no matter where in the world they may be.

== Gender bias in artificial intelligence ==
Gender bias in artificial intelligence refers to the circumstances in which AI systems reflect and perpetuate existing societal biases, leading to unfair or discriminatory results. These biases can manifest in various ways.

== Gender bias in colors ==
Gender bias can manifest as a type of color bias that reinforces societal association of certain colors with specific genders, particularly pink with girls and blue with boys, which can perpetuate harmful stereotypes. This bias is a relatively modern construct.

== Gender bias in credit decisions ==
Women who own small businesses often struggle to access credit on the same terms as men. An impact evaluation with a commercial bank in Peru in 2012 showed that the bias operated mainly through the loan terms rather than approval. Women were offered smaller loans by loan officers with limited experience with SMEs, which made the offers less attractive and lowered take-up. Removing that discretion closed the gap.

== The surgeon riddle ==
A father and son are in a horrible car crash that kills the dad. The son is rushed to the hospital; just as he's about to go under the knife, the surgeon says, "I can't operate—that boy is my son!"

When faced with the surgeon riddle, many people unconsciously assume the surgeon is male, even if they consciously hold egalitarian views; this illustrates implicit gender bias. This is distinct from explicit gender bias, which manifests when individuals consciously express prejudiced beliefs, such as preferring male doctors or openly endorsing sexism.
