= Why Darwin Matters =

2006 book by Michael Shermer

Why Darwin Matters: The Case Against Intelligent Design
- Cover of the first edition
- Author: Michael Shermer
- Cover artist: Lisa Fyfe
- Language: English
- Subject: Intelligent design
- Publisher: Times Books
- Publication date: August 8, 2006
- Publication place: United States
- Media type: Hardcover, paperback, and e-book
- Pages: 223
- ISBN: 0-8050-8121-6
- OCLC: 64511220
- Dewey Decimal: 576.8 22
- LC Class: QH366.2 .S494 2006
- Preceded by: Science Friction: Where the Known Meets the Unknown
- Followed by: The Mind of The Market
- Text: Why Darwin Matters: The Case Against Intelligent Design at Internet Archive

Why Darwin Matters: The Case Against Intelligent Design is a 2006 book by Michael Shermer, an author, publisher, and historian of science. Shermer examines the theory of evolution and the arguments presented against it. He demonstrates that the theory is very robust and is based on a convergence of evidence from a number of different branches of science. The attacks against it are, for the most part, very simplistic and easily demolished. He discusses how evolution and other branches of science can coexist with religious beliefs. He describes how he and Darwin both started out as creationists and how their thinking changed over time. He examines current attitudes towards evolution and science in general. He finds that in many cases the problem people have is not with the facts about evolution but with their ideas of what it implies.

== Contents and synopsis ==
Note that the information in the book, summarized below, was correct when the book was originally published in 2006. Many of the people and topics mentioned or discussed in the book have Wikipedia pages which can be accessed by clicking on them, when highlighted, in the synopsis below. Unless specifically stated otherwise, all material including quoted text in this section is taken from the book, i.e. the book is the sole reference for this material.

=== Prologue: Why Evolution Matters ===
In June 2004, science historian Frank Sulloway and the author (Michael Shermer) spent a month retracing Charles Darwin's footsteps in the Galápagos Islands. Shermer, who was in very good physical condition, found this a very challenging excursion due to a lack of water and a harsh environment. He was struck by how clear the evidence was against creationism. Contrary to an iconic myth, Darwin actually departed the Galápagos in 1835 still a creationist. Shermer attributes this myth to the mistaken idea "that science proceeds by select eureka discoveries." In a journal entry 9 months later, Darwin refers to the different mockingbirds he collected on the Galápagos Islands as "varieties" rather than an evolution of separate species. Sulloway, who made a study of Darwin's journals, concluded that Darwin's acceptance of evolution came after meeting in March 1837 with ornithologist John Gould who studied Darwin's bird specimens. When faced with conclusive evidence that transmutation from one species to another had occurred, he was forced to abandon the universally accepted notion that species were fixed and immutable. In 1844 he was confident enough to write about his findings to a friend, and compared his revelations to "confessing to a murder." He did not publish for 20 years. Acceptance was slow in the scientific community and even slower in the general public. A 2005 poll showed that 42% of Americans hold creationist views compared to 48% who believe in evolution. 64% were open to the idea of teaching both in public schools. Creationism is much less prevalent outside of the USA. The author acknowledges that he also once believed in creationism. He adopted that view in 1971 when he became a born-again Christian in high school, and argued the creationist case through graduate school in 1977. He mastered in statistics while studying psychology and understood its importance in determining if a hypothesis was true or false. He took a course in evolution to see the other side of the debate, and quickly realized that creationist literature "presented a Darwinian cardboard cutout that a child could knock down." He discovered evidence from many different scientific disciplines, all of which converged on the same conclusion: evolution happened. As observed by geneticist Theodosius Dobzhansky, "Nothing in biology makes sense except in the light of evolution."

=== 1. The Facts of Evolution ===
Ever since Darwin's book On the Origin of Species came out in 1859, it has been under attack. Some suggested that he should have just put forward his data and not drawn any conclusions from them. Darwin points out that "all observation must be for or against some view if it is to be of any service." It has also become a fight between religion and science, since evolution is not compatible with the idea that God simply created all of the species.

Prior to developing his theory of evolution, Darwin published a monograph entitled "The Structure and Distribution of Coral Reefs" which showed that what appeared to be different types of coral reefs were actually different stages in coral reef development. Unlike evolution, he came up with the hypothesis first and found the data to verify it later. He did this work on the same voyage of HMS Beagle that took him to the Galápagos.

Unlike some of his contemporaries, Darwin insisted that theory comes to and from the facts, not from political or philosophical beliefs. Thomas Henry Huxley was one of the strongest and most vocal supporters of Darwin and this idea, and he became known as "Darwin's Bulldog". One of the main opposing arguments came from William Paley's 1802 book Natural Theology. It includes the well-known watchmaker argument, which says that since the complexity of a watch clearly requires a human designer, life, being much more complex than a watch, must require God as a designer. Shermer refers to this as a "top down" explanation and evolution as a "bottom up" explanation.

Ernst Mayr outlines 5 general tenets of evolutionary theory that have been discovered in the years since Darwin:

1. Evolution - organisms change through time
2. Descent with modification - offspring differ slightly from their parents
3. Gradualism - significant change occurs through a series of small changes
4. Multiplication - evolution produces an increasing number of new species
5. Natural selection - useful changes are selected and survive

Mayr also gives 5 rules under which natural selection operates:

1. Populations initially increase in a geometric progression
2. The natural environment limits the ultimate population size
3. This results in a struggle for existence
4. There is variation in every species
5. Therefore variations which are more suitable to the environment allow more offspring of that type to be produced, a process known as "differential reproductive success."

Creationist arguments against evolution tend to be simplistic. In one example, evolution is likened to "a warehouse full of parts randomly assorting themselves into a jumbo jet." They focus on the random nature of variations and fail to acknowledge the selection process which is not random.

Darwin was concerned by a lack of transitional fossils between various species. Ernst Mayr provided an explanation known as allopatric speciation which is related to the most common way that a new species can emerge. When a small group of one species breaks away and becomes geographically isolated it can experience rapid genetic changes that happen too quickly to produce a significant fossil record. The larger original group is relatively stable with little genetic change during this time because of diverse interbreeding. If the small break-away group later grows to become a large group, it will also become relatively stable, now as a new species that is similar to, but distinct from, the original one. Niles Eldridge and Stephen Jay Gould apply this to the fossil record and suggest that changes occur in this approximately discontinuous manner, which they call "punctuated equilibrium."

William Whewell, a nineteenth century philosopher, suggested that to prove a theory one needs a "convergence of evidence" from different paths. In the case of evolution, there is abundant and consistent evidence from geology, paleontology, botany, zoology, herpetology, entomology, biogeography, comparative anatomy, genetics, and population genetics.

Creationists like to claim that evolution is not a science because there was no one there to observe it. There is, nevertheless, abundant evidence to prove that evolution is a valid theory and not just a hypothesis. Other branches of science such as geology and cosmology also lack the ability to directly observe past events. The evolution from wolf to dog is a good example because an examination of mitochondrial DNA from the remains of early dogs strongly indicate a connection between ancient American and Eurasian domestic dogs and Old World gray wolves. An excellent compilation of evolutionary convergence is Richard Dawkins' book The Ancestor's Tale. In addition to the convergence of evidence from different branches of science, a comparative method is used to examine how characteristics evolve together across species when adapting to changing environmental or other conditions. Modern organisms show a variety of structures from simple to complex, reflecting an evolutionary history rather than an instantaneous creation. The eye is given as an example of this variety of complexities in different organisms. The human eye is built upside down and backwards, so that light has to travel through blood vessels and various cells before reaching the light receptors. This seems inconsistent with "intelligent" design.

Humans have numerous useless vestigial structures including: male nipples, male uterus remnant, thirteenth rib (in some humans), coccyx (tail bone), wisdom teeth, appendix, body hair, goose bumps, extrinsic ear muscles, and third eyelid remnant. Again, this seems consistent with evolution and not with intelligent design.

The hypothetico-deductive method is often used in analyzing fossils being excavated, in which a hypothesis is formed about existing data and this is used to make deductions which can be tested by acquiring additional data which can confirm or negate the hypothesis. Shermer gives an example where the method was used by Jack Horner (paleontologist) to explain the mystery of what had happened to a large herd of Maiasaurs whose fossil remains all shared some unusual characteristics: the bones were aligned, separated by size, and fractured lengthwise. His explanation involved a two-stage process involving ash from a volcanic eruption which killed them followed later by a flood.

=== 2. Why People Do Not Accept Evolution ===
In 1925 William Jennings Bryan prepared a speech to make at the famous "Scopes Monkey Trial" related to the teaching of evolution. The speech basically said that evolution eliminates God, leading to a breakdown of morality and the loss of meaning for humanity. Shermer proposes that this is the main reason for the rejection by many people of evolution and their refusal to consider any evidence in its favor. But, as Shermer points out, "Accepting evolution does not force us to jettison our morals and ethics, and rejecting evolution does not ensure their constancy." He gives 5 reasons why people resist accepting evolution as a fact:

1. They think that science is something you choose to believe in based on faith, and since they find it in conflict with their religious beliefs, they choose not to believe it.
2. They believe that evolution is a threat to specific religious beliefs, and that science can be used to prove that evolution is false.
3. They fear that evolution degrades our humanity.
4. They equate evolution with nihilism, implying that life is without meaning.
5. They fear that evolution implies that we have a fixed human nature.

=== 3. In Search of the Designer ===
Shermer and Sulloway asked many people why they believe in God and why they think other people believe. They found that being female with religious parents in a large family makes one more religious while being male, educated and in conflict with one's parents makes one less religious. Five common reasons for believing in order of preference:

1. Natural beauty and complexity
2. Experiencing God in everyday life
3. It's comforting
4. The Bible
5. Faith

Six common reasons why people think others believe in order of preference:

1. It's comforting
2. Religious upbringing
3. Experiencing God in everyday life
4. Faith
5. Fear
6. Natural beauty and complexity

Sulloway and Shermer see the differences as intellectual attribution bias, where people see themselves as rational believers and others as emotional believers.

There is a flaw in any intelligent designer argument - If the designer is needed to explain the existence of the world, then how do we explain the existence of the designer? We have just replaced one mystery with another one.

Shermer mentions a famous quote from Arthur C. Clark: "Any sufficiently advanced technology is indistinguishable from magic," and proposes that "Any sufficiently advanced Extra-terrestrial intelligence is indistinguishable from God." Shermer observes that while biological evolution is slow, happening over many generations, technological evolution can happen within a single generation. Computational power tends to increase exponentially over time. It has been proposed that this could lead to a "singularity" where it will appear to be essentially infinite. Shermer wonders what extra-terrestrials who are thousands or even millions of years more advanced than we are would be capable of. Theologian Langdon Gilkey points out that according to the Bible, God is not like a watchmaker, rather he creates out of nothing. Theologian Paul Tillich said "God does not exist. He is being itself beyond essence and existence."

=== 4. Debating Intelligent Design ===
Shermer gives several reasons to engage in debate with intelligent design advocates:

- the debates will occur anyway
- refusing to debate makes it look like you don't have a good argument
- debate forces both sides to present the evidence that they have
- debate is a chance to educate people about science and evolution.

Scottish philosopher David Hume once stated an important maxim: “no testimony is sufficient to establish a miracle, unless the testimony be of such a kind, that its falsehood would be more miraculous, than the fact, which it endeavors to establish.” This is often stated as "extraordinary claims require extraordinary evidence." Darwin has provided fairly extraordinary evidence in favor of evolution, creationists have not done so for their claim of supernatural creation and the burden of proof lies with them. Shermer discusses the "either-or fallacy": given two possible explanations for something, disproving one does prove the other since the truth might be different from both. Creationists often claim to disprove evolution and then offer that as the primary evidence that their supernatural explanation is correct. Shermer defines the "fossil fallacy": that the scarcity of transitional fossils between different species is proof that evolution is false. In other words, the lack of one particular piece of evidence somehow negates the convergence of an overwhelming amount of evidence that proves the truth of evolution. More generally, creationists employ the "God in the gaps" argument: any apparent gap in scientific knowledge is viewed as evidence of supernatural design rather than as an area in need of more scientific research. An example is Isaac Newton's "plane problem": the orbits of the planets all lie approximately in the same plane and Newton could not think of any scientific reason why this was so. Therefore he proposed that God had started the planets in motion. But astronomers now have a very good understanding of how the solar system formed, and there is no need for a supernatural explanation. Methodological naturalism is a term that means that life and the behavior of the universe are the result of natural processes.

The best arguments for intelligent design:

- The universe is fine tuned to support life, and therefore God supplied this tuning by setting the values of various physical constants. Shermer considers this their best argument. An alternate explanation is the anthropic principle which assumes there is some self-selection process. This could involve, for example, the idea that our universe is one of many in a multiverse which all have different tunings or parameters and at least one of those, the one we are in, has the needed parameters. Shermer discusses this and various other possibilities in considerable detail.
- The Design Inference, which is the claim that there is a difference between naturally designed objects and those that are intelligently designed. It is clear, for example, that Mount Rushmore sculptures were designed by intelligence and not by erosion. Shermer argues that this design inference is entirely subjective when applied to structures related to life that can be explained to have been produced by evolution.
- Explanatory filter: Mathematician William Dembski devised an "explanatory filter" which essentially says that if something is not clearly produced by nature or by chance then it must be the result of intelligent design. But his approach seems to ignore the mechanism of evolution or simply to argue that it is too improbable without any valid scientific basis for determining that.
- Irreducible complexity: Darwin stated that if a structure existed that could not possibly have been created by small steps through natural selection then his theory would break down. Intelligent design advocates have proposed many candidates for "Darwin's exception," such as the human eye. (As mentioned previously, the construction of the human eye actually appears illogical in a way that is more consistent with evolution than with design). In some cases it is found that the proposed "irreducible" structures were likely adaptations of structures that evolved for another purposes.
- Conservation of Information: William Dembski proposed this new conservation law and defined a universal probability bound that he claims is 500 bits of information. It has not been generally accepted by the scientific community. Shermer points out that even if this was a valid concept, information in the natural world, such as that contained in DNA, is transferred and increased by natural processes. Richard Dawkins was able to reconstruct the evolution of hemoglobin and evidence was found in the fossil record to support his findings.
- Evolution can't be observed, no experiments can show evolution. As Shermer points out, this is ignoring the fossil record as well as the more rapid evolution that is directly observed in diseases such as the AIDS virus.
- Macro and micro evolution, large scale changes require a designer while small scale changes do occur naturally. This allows the acceptance of data verifying short term evolutionary processes while still maintaining that God created the species.
- The Second Law of Thermodynamics proves evolution is false. The second law states that disorder must increase or remain constant in a closed isolated system, but living organisms are not isolated systems so this does not apply.
- Randomness cannot produce complex design. As Shermer points out, natural selection is not random, as it preserves the gains and eradicates the mistakes.
- The "icons of evolution" are all wrong. Jonathan Wells (intelligent design advocate) originated this term, listing ten "icons" that he claims are fallacies, fakes, or frauds. But as Shermer points out, even if Wells is correct about these ten things, it amounts to very little compared to the vast amount of evidence that points to the validity of evolution.

=== 5. Science under Attack ===
Richard Feynman once said "How do we look for a new law? First we guess it." In other words, we use our imagination to come up with a hypothesis and then we test it to see if it's any good. Proponents of intelligent design took that first step, but then failed to throw out their hypothesis when it failed in the testing stage. Instead they decided to use the legislative process to force their idea into the classroom. While private schools have the right to teach children as they please, one could argue that public schools, being funded by taxes, should teach what the taxpayers want them to. But this is problematic since there are a large number of differing religious beliefs and the school doesn't have the time to teach all of these religious views on the origin of life as well as (or instead of) the scientific one. Changes in what is generally accepted as fact by the scientific community is typically a very slow process. One example relating to evolution is the theory of symbiogenesis, which says that evolution is driven mainly by the exchange of genomes rather than by random mutations. It has taken 30 years for this theory to reach a point of somewhat general acceptance. Shermer defines science as "a testable body of knowledge open to rejection or confirmation." Science utilizes the "hypothetical deductive method": formulate a hypothesis, make predictions from that hypothesis, test those predictions. Facts are the world's data. Hypotheses are possible explanations of those facts, which need to be tested. Theories are not hypotheses nor are they data, rather they are robust explanatory ideas about that data, that has been tested and is considered reliable. Nevertheless, all theories are tentative, subject to reexamination and possible rejection and replacement. This was the case, for example, with the Ptolemaic theory of planetary motion in which the Earth is stationary and at the center of the universe.

Two court cases in the 1980s related to evolution vs creationism codified scientific principle into law. One of these, Edwards v. Aguillard went all the way to the Supreme Court. The majority opinion of the court was that there was no science in creation-science. Science only seeks naturalistic explanations. In a 2005 case, Kitzmiller v. Dover Area School District, a school board was sued for introducing a book on "intelligent design." The prosecution was able to show quite easily that this was just a reinvented version of creation-science which had been previously ruled unscientific by the Supreme Court and was therefore not allowed to be presented as an alternative scientific theory in the classroom.

=== 6. The Real Agenda ===
Shermer describes his friendly interactions with William Dembski, Paul Nelson, and Stephen C. Meyer who are proponents of intelligent design. Although they claim to be pursuing a scientific agenda, they also admit that they believe that the intelligent designer is the Judeo-Christian-Islamic God. Shermer says that, to his knowledge, all but one of the leading advocates of intelligent design are evangelical Christians, the exception being a follower of Reverend Moon and member of his Unification Church which identifies Moon as the Messiah. Looking at the data relating to intelligent design, Shermer concludes that there is a religious and political agenda behind whatever science they think they are pursuing. At a conference, Dembski told the audience that "The job of apologetics is to clear the ground, to clear obstacles that prevent people from coming to the knowledge of Christ... And if there's anything that I think has blocked the growth of Christ as the free rein of the Spirit and people accepting the Scripture and Jesus Christ, it is the Darwinian naturalistic view." Phillip E. Johnson, fountainhead of the intelligent design movement and author of "The Wedge of Truth," put it very bluntly: "This is not just an attack on naturalism, it's a religious war against all of science." At a meeting of the Bible Institute of Los Angeles, Paul Nelson acknowledged "Easily the biggest challenge facing the ID community is to develop a full-fledged theory of biological design." Lee Anne Chaney, a professor of biology and a Christian says: "I don't think intelligent design is very helpful because it does not provide things that are refutable." Organizations promoting intelligent design are heavily funded by right wing religious groups, some of whom think this should be a Christian nation rather than a secular one.

=== 7. Why Science Cannot Contradict Religion ===
Darwin's father and grandfather were both physicians. Darwin himself decided that medicine wasn't to his liking and instead chose to study theology. This allowed him to study natural phenomena since this could be considered "natural theology." At this time he was religious and a practicing member of the Church of England. He lost his faith gradually, after his travels on HMS Beagle. He was particularly influenced by the cruel nature of the relationship between predators and prey, which he felt was at odds with the concept of creation by a beneficent God. The suffering of humans and other sentient beings seemed often to serve no purpose. In his own case, this included the loss of his 10-year-old daughter. He came to view himself as agnostic. He focused on his scientific research and preferred to make no statements about religion. He stated once that he felt that people could not be convinced by direct arguments against religion, rather they should be gradually illuminated by science and make up their own minds about religion.

Shermer proposes three possible relationships between science and religion:

1. The Conflicting-Worlds Model, which holds that science and religion can't both be correct, so one must be wrong. In this model, the opposing point of view contributes nothing of value and needs to be suppressed.
2. The Same-World Model, science and religion are two ways of examining the same reality and both play important roles. The Pope and the Dalai Lama fall into this category. Biblical passages may be viewed metaphorically, taking them out of conflict with scientific knowledge.
3. The Separate-Worlds Model, in which science and religion are viewed as nonoverlapping bodies of knowledge. Paleontologist Stephen Jay Gould was a proponent of this idea which he referred to as non-overlapping magisteria. Science provides explanations of the natural world while religion provides personal meaning and spirituality.

Shermer argues that only the third model is viable for theists, i.e. those who believe in a God who intervenes in the universe. Science must be falsifiable, there must be a test which could show that it is false. But do we want to test the existence of God? There have been studies to see if prayer has some scientifically measurable effect. To date, no such studies that adhered to strict scientific controls have shown a measurable effect. Nor have the proponents of intelligent design produced any scientifically acceptable evidence of the existence of God. In the separate worlds model, however, this is not a problem since by assumption the rules of science only apply to the world of science. Darwin's thinking seems to fall in the Separate Worlds category. A is A, reality is real, you cannot use nature to prove the supernatural. Evolution created the body, God created the soul. Pope John Paul II wrote in 1996 the encyclical "Truth Cannot Contradict Truth," regarding the compatibility of evolution and religion. God is beyond the dominion of science, and science is outside the realm of God.

=== 8. Why Christians and Conservatives Should Accept Evolution ===
Darwin, in the 2nd edition of On the Origin of Species, stated that he saw no reason for the theory of evolution to be considered incompatible with religious beliefs. A 1996 survey found that 39% of American scientists believe in God, and yet a 1997 poll indicated that 99% of the same group believed in the validity of the theory of evolution. President Jimmy Carter is an evangelical Christian and is also a scientist who accepts evolution. Pope John Paul II proclaimed that evolution happened and that it is no threat to religion. Shermer estimates that 96 million American Christians believe that God used evolution to guide the process of creating advanced forms of life. Studies did show that there were considerable differences in levels of acceptance of evolution among different groups: Democrats more than Republicans, liberals more than conservatives, college educated more than those without college education, younger more than older, and southern states less than other regions. Shermer points out that many other scientific facts have a much wider acceptance, including the Sun-centered Solar System, gravity, continental drift, the germ theory of disease, the genetic basis of heredity, etc. Shermer also argues that the creationist view of God is limiting, because it views God as a mere "watchmaker" who constructs lifeforms from parts rather than the creator of the universe and the laws of nature.

The process of evolution led to the formation of family values and social harmony, as these enhance the survival of family and community, but it also led to more negative human attributes such as those coming from competition over resources. Honest communication is of particular importance in promoting social harmony. Religions often characterize the harmonious choices as moral or good and the opposite choices as bad or evil.

Shermer proposes that there is a similarity between Darwin's theory of natural selection and Adam Smith's concept of the "invisible hand" in free market economics. Both have beneficial consequences that were not intentional.

=== 9. The Real Unsolved Problems in Evolution ===
Shermer discusses the current thinking on following questions in some detail:

- How did life begin?
- What caused the Cambrian explosion of life?
- What is the origin of complex life?
- Where did modern humans evolve?
- What direct evidence is there for natural selection and evolution?
- What is the difference between natural selection and sexual selection?
- What is right in evolutionary theory?

=== Epilogue: Why Science Matters ===
Shermer recounts his experiences at Esalen, a hot springs, retreat, and workshop center on the California coast. It is a spot that has attracted a broad spectrum of creative people including scientists, philosophers, writers, and new age gurus. Shermer mentions his long time desire to visit there after reading about it in an autobiographical book by physicist Richard Feynman called Surely You're Joking, Mr. Feynman! Shermer gave a talk there on the evolutionary origins of morality at a conference on evolutionary theory and later returned to do a weekend workshop on science and spirituality. He had many interesting conversations during his time there. Shermer notes that "Anything that generates a sense of awe may be a source of spirituality. Science does this in spades." He suggests "Maybe God is the laws of nature-or even nature itself."

As Shermer puts it "Darwin matters because evolution matters. Evolution matters because science matters. Science matters because it is the preeminent story of our age, an epic saga about who we are, where we came from, and where we are going."

=== Coda: Genesis Revisited ===
Intelligent design is inherently a supernatural explanation that offers no testable hypotheses and no science. In order to demonstrate the logical absurdity of intelligent design, Shermer closes out the book with an amusing rewriting of Genesis as a scientific document.

=== Appendix: Equal Time for Whom? ===
Typically every court case and curriculum dispute regarding evolution includes a demand for equal time. But as Shermer points out, there are a considerable number of alternate ideas and myths about the origin of life and the universe. Not only are these ideas unscientific or pseudoscientific, but there isn't enough time in a typical science class to discuss all of them in any detail:

- Young Earth creationism - claiming the universe is less than 10000 years old
- Old Earth creationism - Earth is old, but new species do not evolve
- Gap creationism - relating to the two versions of creation that are presented sequentially in Genesis, interpreted as two separate events: the original creation, and following a long gap in time, a 6-day re-creation, thereby reconciling the scientific age of the earth with the biblical description.
- Day-age creationism - based on the idea that the days in the creation story are actually much longer than a day.
- Progressive creationism - in which God creates forms of life gradually over long periods of time.
- Intelligent design - claiming that there is scientific evidence of an intelligent designer (God).
- Evolutionary creationism - that God is actively involved in the process of evolution
- Theistic evolutionism - God creates using the laws of nature.

In addition to these Biblical ideas there are also many ideas from other religions; Shermer divides these into several general categories:

- There was no creation - things were always the same (from India),
- The slain monster creation story (Sumerian-Babylonian),
- The primordial parents creation stories (Zuni Indian, Cook Islander, and Egyptian),
- The cosmic egg creation stories (Japanese, Samoan, Persian, and Chinese),
- The spoken edict creation stories (the Bible and also Mayan and Egyptian)
- The sea creation stories (Burmese, Choctaw Indian, and Icelander)

=== Notes ===
This section of the book has very detailed notes that are referred to in the various chapters.

=== Selected bibliography ===
This section of the book lists a number of books and also websites, both those that support intelligent design and those which support evolution.

=== Index ===
This section has a very detailed index to the contents of the book. The e-book edition does not include the index since its contents can be searched directly.

== Reception ==
Christopher Hitchens commented on the book, "With his forensic and polemical skill, he could have left them for dead: instead he generously urges them to stop wasting their time (and ours) and do some real work."

Steven Pinker wrote it is "A readable and well-researched book on what is perhaps the most vital scientific topic of our age. Anyone who has been snowed into thinking that there is a real scientific controversy over evolution by natural selection will be enlightened by Why Darwin Matters, which is both genial and intellectually uncompromising."

Robert Lee Hotz, for the Los Angeles Times explained "None writes so fiercely in defense of evolution as Shermer... With the sustained indignation of a former creationist, Shermer is savage about the shortcomings of intelligent design and eloquent about the spirituality of science. In Why Darwin Matters, he has assembled an invaluable primer for anyone caught up in an argument with a well-intentioned intelligent design advocate."

Norman Levitt states that the book "gets high marks for its amiable style, its readability, and the unmistakable moral passion of the author. It is impressive in the wide range of issues and questions it addresses." Levitt does however indicate that he thinks the book could have benefitted from being a bit more comprehensive in some areas.

Tania Lombrozo states "Shermer’s own experiences and expertise make him uniquely suited to the task of explaining the overwhelming evidence for evolution...and why it is under attack." "He emphasizes that the source of resistance to evolution is rarely the scientific details but rather the perceived consequences of evolution: atheism, ethical nihilism, and a lack of meaning."

Jim Walker wrote, "This book should appeal to Christians who want to understand evolution but who do not want to feel offended by the anti-religious tone of some evolutionary scientists. Shermer carefully explains, in a non-threatening manner, how evolution and natural selection works while also explaining why Intelligent Design theory cannot explain the diversity of life on the planet earth."
