= Automatic emergency call =

Automatic emergency call refers to a system that automatically contacts emergency services or emergency contacts, in the event of a serious accident (for automobiles) or in the event of an alarm being triggered in a building. Call, text message or notification, sent via cell tower, radio, landline and/or satellite.

It is called differently depending on the system:

- Automatic Crash Response, an OnStar feature
- eCall or "emergency call", mandatory for new cars in the European Union since 2018
- Car Crash Detection, on Google Pixel 3 smartphones and newer
- Crash Detection, on Apple Watch and iPhone devices
- Emergency Assistance, on Ford cars with Sync
  - RESCU (Ford), on older Ford cars
- Crash or fall detection on helmets or body armour

Additionally, many newer fire alarm control panels are designed with an automatic emergency call feature where the fire department will be notified if the alarm is triggered through any means other than a manual activation for a fire drill or system test.
