= Motorcycle safety in the United Kingdom =

Road safety of motorcyclists in the UK

Motorcycle safety in the United Kingdom covers the road safety of riders and passengers of motorcycles, mopeds and motor tricycles in the United Kingdom, together with the licensing, training, equipment, infrastructure and statistical arrangements that apply to them. Motorcyclists are classed by the Department for Transport (DfT) as vulnerable road users, alongside pedestrians and pedal cyclists, because they are not enclosed by a vehicle body during a collision.

Casualty statistics for Great Britain are compiled by the DfT from police STATS19 returns and published in Reported Road Casualties Great Britain; Northern Ireland casualties are reported separately by the Police Service of Northern Ireland (PSNI). In 2025 motorcycle users accounted for 25% of reported road deaths in Great Britain from about 1% of road traffic, and had the highest death and serious-injury rate per mile travelled of any road user group.

Motorcycle licensing follows a tiered structure of categories AM, A1, A2 and A that took effect on 19 January 2013, entered through Compulsory Basic Training (CBT) and two practical riding tests administered by the Driver and Vehicle Standards Agency (DVSA). Helmet use is compulsory under the Road Traffic Act 1988, while other protective clothing is not required by law. The government's Road Safety Strategy, published on 7 January 2026, committed to consulting on reform of motorcycle training, testing and licensing and included two motorcyclist-specific national safety performance indicators.

== Casualty statistics ==
=== Great Britain ===
Reported Road Casualties Great Britain is the DfT's accredited official statistics series on road collisions, based on the STATS19 collision record completed by police forces. The final results for 2025 were published on 30 July 2026 and reported 1,538 fatalities, 29,918 killed or seriously injured (KSI) casualties and 127,883 casualties of all severities across all road users in Great Britain.

Within those totals, motorcycle users accounted for 386 deaths, 6,096 KSI casualties and 15,447 casualties of all severities. Motorcyclists made up 25% of road deaths while representing about 1% of road traffic, and 39% of motorcyclist casualties were killed or seriously injured, compared with 17% of car occupant casualties.

Expressed as rates per billion vehicle miles travelled in 2025, motorcycle users recorded 128 deaths, 2,019 KSI casualties and 5,116 casualties of all severities, against 2, 43 and 258 respectively for car occupants. On that measure the DfT put the motorcyclist fatality rate at roughly 50 times the car occupant rate.

Motorcyclist deaths rose in each of 2024 and 2025, reaching their highest level of the preceding decade. Compared with 2024, motorcyclist fatalities increased by 14% and KSI casualties by 7%; compared with 2015, fatalities were 6% higher while KSI casualties were 12% lower. Motorcyclists were the only one of the four main road user groups whose fatalities in 2025 were above the 2015 level.

Over the longer run, reported motorcyclist casualties have fallen while motorcycle traffic has been broadly stable. In 2004 there were 585 motorcyclists killed, 8,324 seriously injured and 16,732 slightly injured across 3.15 billion vehicle miles of motorcycle traffic; in 2025 the equivalent figures were 386 killed, 5,710 seriously injured and 9,351 slightly injured across 3.02 billion vehicle miles. The overall motorcyclist casualty rate per mile travelled fell by 37% between 2004 and 2025, with the fatality rate down 31%.

Averaged over 2021 to 2025, an average of 7 motorcyclists were killed and 104 seriously injured each week in reported road collisions in Great Britain.

=== Northern Ireland ===
Northern Ireland casualties are recorded by the PSNI and published as accredited official statistics separately from the Great Britain series. In the year to 31 December 2025 the PSNI recorded 5,015 injury road traffic collisions, resulting in 56 fatalities, 1,066 people seriously injured and 6,757 slightly injured. Of the 23 vulnerable road users killed that year, 6 were motorcyclists, alongside 16 pedestrians and 1 pedal cyclist.

=== Circumstances of collisions ===
DfT analysis of grouped 2021 to 2025 data reports that 70% of motorcycle fatalities in Great Britain occurred on roads in rural areas, against 38% of motorcycle traffic, while 3% of fatalities occurred on motorways against 6% of traffic. A majority of motorcycle fatalities, 62.3%, occurred away from a junction or more than 20 metres from one, compared with 47.8% of seriously injured motorcycle casualties.

Where another vehicle was involved, two-vehicle collisions with a car produced the largest number of motorcyclist deaths over 2021 to 2025, at 637. The highest proportion of fatal outcomes occurred in two-vehicle collisions involving a heavy goods vehicle, at 9.8% of motorcyclist casualties in such collisions. Over the same period 92% of motorcyclist KSI casualties were male.

Weekday motorcyclist KSI casualties peak between 07:00 and 10:00 and between 16:00 and 19:00, while at weekends there is a single peak in the early afternoon.

Under the road safety factors recorded by police officers for fatal or serious collisions in 2024 and 2025, the factor most often assigned both to motorcyclists and to the other vehicles involved was "ineffective observation by either the driver or rider or pedestrian", recorded for 41% of motorcyclists and 63% of non-motorcyclists. "Driver or rider exceeding speed limit" was assigned to 26% of motorcyclists and 5% of non-motorcyclists. The DfT notes that these factors reflect the reporting officer's opinion, are assigned without extensive investigation and should be interpreted with caution.

The Royal Society for the Prevention of Accidents (RoSPA), reviewing the in-depth crash studies conducted by the Transport Research Laboratory (TRL), the DfT and the European motorcycle manufacturers' association ACEM, groups the recurring British crash types as failure to negotiate a bend, collisions at junctions, overtaking collisions and loss of control. RoSPA also records that many non-fatal injury collisions are never reported to the police, so published casualty counts understate the true total.

A DfT in-depth study published in 2004, which examined 1,790 collisions involving a motorcycle, found that two of the three most common collision types arose from the actions of other road users rather than the rider.

== Licensing and training ==
=== Licence categories ===
Great Britain operates a tiered motorcycle licensing structure. Different rules apply to riders who held a motorcycle or moped licence before 19 January 2013, the date on which the current categories took effect.

Motorcycle and moped licence categories in Great Britain
Category	Vehicles covered	Route	Minimum age
AM	Mopeds with a speed range of 25 to 45 km/h; small three-wheelers up to 50 cc and below 4 kW; light quadricycles	CBT, theory test, practical test	16
Q	As AM, plus two or three-wheeled mopeds with a top speed of 25 km/h	Granted with AM	16
A1	Light motorcycles up to 11 kW and 125 cc, with a power-to-weight ratio not exceeding 0.1 kW per kg; motor tricycles up to 15 kW	CBT, theory test, practical test	17
A2	Standard motorcycles up to 35 kW with a power-to-weight ratio not exceeding 0.2 kW per kg, not derived from a vehicle of more than twice that power	Direct access, or progressive access after two years on A1	19
A	Motorcycles unrestricted in size or power, with or without sidecar; motor tricycles over 15 kW	Direct access from age 24, or progressive access after two years holding A2 from age 21	24 (direct) or 21 (progressive)

Source: DVLA guidance published on GOV.UK.

=== Compulsory basic training and testing ===
Before riding unaccompanied on the road, a learner must hold a provisional licence and complete Compulsory Basic Training, a course delivered by an approved training body and made up of five elements covering introduction and eyesight, machine controls, off-road riding, road safety briefing and on-road riding. After completing CBT a rider has two years in which to pass the motorcycle theory test and both parts of the practical test, failing which CBT must be taken again.

The practical test is administered by the DVSA in two parts. Module 1 is an off-road test of manoeuvres conducted at a designated test centre; module 2 is an on-road riding test. Module 1 must be passed before module 2 can be taken, and each carries a separate fee. There is no minimum number of lessons.

Riders who hold a full licence may take the DVSA Enhanced Rider Scheme, a post-test assessment and training package for which some insurers offer premium discounts.

=== Post-test and advanced training ===
Post-test rider training in the UK is delivered by charities, police forces and commercial providers. IAM RoadSmart and RoSPA both run advanced rider courses. BikeSafe is a police-led workshop programme, described by its organisers as running across 38 police forces and more than 100 venues, in which advanced police riders deliver classroom theory and an observed ride followed by written or recorded feedback. BikeSafe states that it is not a formal training programme.

=== Proposed reform ===
The Road Safety Strategy published in January 2026 stated that legislative changes made to improve motorcyclist safety had produced a complex training, testing and licensing regime, and committed the government to consulting on reform of the regime for category A licences in Great Britain.

The DVSA consultation "Improving moped and motorcycle training, testing and licensing" ran from 7 January to 11 May 2026 and applied to England, Scotland and Wales. It sought views on restricting learner riders to automatic machines where CBT was completed on one, introducing a theory test to be taken before or as part of CBT, introducing a progressive access training course for licence upgrades, updating the CBT syllabus, changing how motorcycle instructors qualify, and changing certificate validity periods. Responses were under analysis as of August 2026.

Rider and industry bodies have linked the reform question to the casualty figures. Following the DfT's provisional 2025 statistics, the National Motorcyclists Council said the figures underlined the need for reform of the motorcycle training and testing regime, while the Motorcycle Industry Association called for the DVSA and DfT Motorcycle Strategy Group to be reconvened. After the final 2025 statistics were published, IAM RoadSmart said the increase in motorcyclist fatalities was of deep concern and that the government's strategy needed clear timelines and funding.

== Protective equipment ==
=== Helmets ===
Rule 83 of The Highway Code requires the rider and any pillion passenger of a motorcycle, scooter or moped to wear a compliant, securely fastened protective helmet on every journey, and exempts Sikhs who are wearing a turban. The rule is founded on sections 16 and 17 of the Road Traffic Act 1988 and on the Motor Cycles (Protective Helmets) Regulations 1998.

A helmet worn on a UK road must meet British Standard BS 6658:1985 and carry the BSI Kitemark, or UNECE Regulation 22.05, or UNECE Regulation 22.06, or a European Economic Area standard offering at least equivalent protection and carrying an equivalent mark.

=== Helmet ratings ===
The Safety Helmet Assessment and Rating Programme (SHARP) is a consumer information scheme launched by the DfT in 2007 following research that identified differences in the safety performance of helmets sold in the UK. SHARP states that motorcyclists typically represent 1% of UK traffic but 19% of casualties, that around 80% of motorcyclist fatalities and 70% of those seriously injured sustain head injuries, and that helmet detachment has been reported in 10% to 14% of casualties.

Each helmet model is assessed through 30 linear and 2 oblique impact tests using a minimum of seven samples across a range of sizes, at impact speeds of 6.0, 7.5 and 8.5 metres per second against flat, kerb and abrasive anvils. The 8.5 m/s test speed is higher than that required by UNECE Regulation 22.05 (7.5 m/s) or Regulation 22.06 (8.2 m/s). Results are weighted using crash data from the European COST 327 study and expressed as a rating from one to five stars.

SHARP reported in June 2026 that it had tested more than 600 helmet models over 18 years, that the proportion achieving 3, 4 or 5 stars had risen across successive periods, that most of the more than 50 Regulation 22.06 helmets tested by that date had achieved 4 or 5 stars, and that it continued to observe no correlation between a helmet model's price and its star rating.

=== Other equipment ===
Rule 84 of the Highway Code states that eye protectors, where worn, must comply with the regulations, and advises that strong boots, gloves and suitable clothing may offer protection in a collision. GOV.UK guidance states that there is no law requiring protective clothing other than a helmet.

== Conspicuity and driver awareness ==
Rule 86 of the Highway Code advises riders to be as easy to see from the side as from ahead and behind, noting that a light or brightly coloured helmet, fluorescent clothing and dipped headlights in daylight may increase conspicuity, while adding that other drivers may still fail to see a motorcycle or misjudge its distance or speed at junctions. Rule 87 advises reflective clothing or strips when riding in the dark.

Rule 211, addressed to drivers, states that motorcyclists and cyclists are often difficult to see when waiting alongside, approaching from behind, emerging from junctions, at roundabouts, overtaking or filtering through traffic, and instructs drivers to look for them before emerging from a junction and to give way to them on the inside of traffic when turning right across a queue.

RoSPA describes the difficulty other road users have in detecting an approaching motorcyclist, or in judging its speed and position, as a widely accepted factor in motorcycle collisions. It cites ACEM in-depth data in which a traffic scanning error was identified in 60% of collisions between motorcycles and other vehicles, and summarises research on "looked but failed to see" collisions in which drivers do not look, look for too short a time or in the wrong place, detect the motorcycle too late, or misjudge its time to collision.

A population-based case-control study of 463 injured motorcycle riders and 1,233 controls conducted in the Auckland region of New Zealand between 1993 and 1996, widely cited in conspicuity research, reported that riders wearing reflective or fluorescent clothing had a 37% lower adjusted risk of crash-related injury, that a white helmet was associated with a 24% lower risk than a black helmet, and that daytime headlight use was associated with a 27% lower risk.

== Filtering ==
Riding between lanes of slow-moving or stationary traffic is known in the UK as filtering. Rule 88 of the Highway Code addresses it within its guidance on manoeuvring, advising riders to keep track of what is behind and to either side, to watch for pedestrians crossing between vehicles and for vehicles emerging from junctions or changing lanes when in traffic queues, to position themselves so that drivers ahead can see them in their mirrors, and, when filtering in slow-moving traffic, to take care and keep speed low. The Highway Code does not prohibit the manoeuvre. Rule 211 separately instructs drivers to look out for motorcyclists filtering through traffic.

RoSPA records that 15% of motorcyclists involved in a collision in 2018 were overtaking at the time, against 2.6% of car drivers, and that in-depth crash research found blame attached wholly or partly to the other road user twice as often as to the rider in filtering incidents, which RoSPA puts down partly to drivers not expecting a narrow vehicle to come through where a car or lorry could not.

== Road infrastructure ==
=== Safety barriers ===
Impacts with roadside vehicle restraint systems are a recognised motorcyclist injury mechanism because most installed barriers were not designed with motorcyclists in mind and exposed supporting posts present sharp edges. TRL reported to National Highways in November 2020 that motorcycle-to-barrier incidents accounted for only 0.2% of all casualties on the strategic road network, but that 76% of motorcycle-to-barrier impacts between 2014 and 2018 produced a KSI casualty, against 16% for other barrier impacts. Adjusted for distance travelled, motorcycles recorded 2.33 fatal single-vehicle barrier collisions per billion vehicle kilometres against 0.07 for cars, roughly 33 times the rate.

Of the 174 motorcycle-to-barrier incidents analysed on the network between 2014 and 2018, the largest share of any single road type occurred on slip roads, at almost a quarter, with grade-separated junctions and curves identified as higher-risk locations. TRL found that motorcyclist protection systems on the market are designed for impacts in which a rider is sliding along the ground, which account for about half of motorcycle-to-barrier impacts, and reported that as of April 2020 only 7.4% of high-risk slip roads on the network had such a system installed. The National Highways standard CD 377 requires appropriate mitigation measures to be specified where a risk to motorcyclists is identified.

=== Rural roads ===
DfT data records that 70% of motorcycle fatalities in Great Britain over 2021 to 2025 occurred on rural roads, against 38% of motorcycle traffic. The 2026 Road Safety Strategy describes Project PRIME, an initiative using road markings and signage at sharp bends to influence rider positioning and braking, and reports that an evaluation of trials in the West Highlands of Scotland recorded better rider behaviour at some of the sites.

== Policy framework ==
The DfT published a national Road Safety Strategy for Great Britain on 7 January 2026, described by the British Motorcyclists Federation as the first in over a decade. It set overarching targets of a 65% reduction in people killed or seriously injured on Great Britain's roads by 2035 against a 2022 to 2024 baseline, and a 70% reduction for children under 16.

The strategy states that motorcyclists represent 1% of motor vehicle traffic while making up 21% of those killed on the roads and 12% of casualties overall, and that, per billion miles travelled, a motorcyclist faces more than 40 times the risk of being killed or seriously injured that a car traveller does. Alongside the licensing consultation it commits to piloting a National Work-Related Road Safety Charter covering businesses whose staff ride motorcycles, to establishing a Road Safety Investigation Branch for Great Britain, and to continuing behavioural campaigns through THINK!.

Two of the strategy's national safety performance indicators are motorcyclist-specific: the share of motorcyclist KSI casualties in collisions where ineffective observation was a contributory factor, and the share where speed contributed. The World Health Organization published commentary on the strategy in June 2026.

Road safety policy in Wales, Scotland and Northern Ireland is devolved, although driver and vehicle licensing and the Highway Code apply across Great Britain and, for the Highway Code, largely mirror arrangements in Northern Ireland.

== Campaigns and organisations ==
THINK!, the DfT's road safety campaign brand, runs a motorcycling strand whose stated aim is to build empathy between drivers and riders. Its campaigns have included "Didn't See" radio advertising directed at drivers at junctions and the "Never too good" series encouraging riders to take further training.

Rider representation is divided among several bodies. The National Motorcyclists Council is a coalition whose members are the Auto Cycle Union, the British Motorcyclists Federation, IAM RoadSmart, the National Motorcycle Dealers Association, Plantec Assist and the Trail Riders Fellowship, and which states that its members and their affiliates represent approaching 100,000 motorcyclists and motorcyclist-facing businesses. The Motorcycle Industry Association represents manufacturers, importers and dealers, and RoSPA and IAM RoadSmart are road safety charities active in rider training and policy.

== See also ==
- Motorcycle safety
- Reported Road Casualties Great Britain
- Compulsory Basic Training
- SHARP (helmet ratings)
- Motorcycle helmet laws
- The Highway Code
- Driving licence in the United Kingdom
- Lane splitting
- Motorcycle personal protective equipment
- Vulnerable road user
- STATS19
