= Shoei =

Manufacturer of motorsport helmets

Shoei Co., Ltd.
- Native name: 株式会社SHOEI
- Type: Public K.K.
- Traded as: TYO: 7839
- Industry: Motorcycle helmet manufacturing
- Founded: 17 March 1959
- Founder: Eitaro Kamata
- Headquarters: Taitō, Tokyo, Japan
- Key people: Kenichiro Ishida (President)
- Revenue: ▲¥23,752 Million (September 30, 2021)
- Operating income: ▲¥6,092 Million (September 30, 2021)
- Net income: ▲¥4,407 Million (September 30, 2021)
- Total assets: ▲¥23,778 Million (September 30, 2021)
- Total equity: ▲¥18,528 Million (September 30, 2021)
- Number of employees: 654
- Website: shoei.com

Shoei Co., Ltd (株式会社 Shoei, Kabushiki-gaisha Shoei) is a Japanese company specializing in motorsport helmets.

== History ==
Shoei is a Japanese company producing motorcycle helmets since 1958. Its roots go back to 1954 with the founding of Kamata Polyester Co., which mainly produced safety helmets for use in the construction industry.

Shoei's founder, Eitaro Kamata (鎌田栄太郎), was born to a Tokyo family that operated a traditional Japanese restaurant, Edogin, and an inn, 'Kamata Ryokan', near Shimbashi Station. Honda Motor Co. was located in Hamamatsu, and its founder, Soichiro Honda, and test rider Kiyoshi Kawashima were inn regulars as they often had business to attend to in the capital. Thus, Eitaro got acquainted with Mr. Kawashima, who often arrived at the inn on a motorcycle, and admired Mr. Kawashima's style with a painted helmet. Eitaro left the family business and started up a helmet factory in 1960, in Tokyo, to produce motorcycle helmets to meet the Japanese Industrial Standard (JIS).

In 1965, Honda Motor Co. selected Shoei's helmets as their 'genuine' helmets as a part of Honda Parts and Accessories line of products, increasing their popularity and, ultimately, availability. This initiated a global expansion of the Shoei brand: the Shoei Safety Helmet Corporation was established in the U.S. in 1968 (shortly after construction of the Ibaraki factory; the current Iwate factory was built in 1989), quickly followed by other dependencies in France (Shoei Europe Distribution s.a.r.l., 1987), Germany (Shoei Europa Gmbh, 1994), Italy (Shoei Italia s.r.l., 2011) and Thailand (Shoei Asia Co., Ltd., 2019).

Despite their success and market share, Shoei remains a relatively small company, with a workforce of under 800 people worldwide.

== Helmets ==
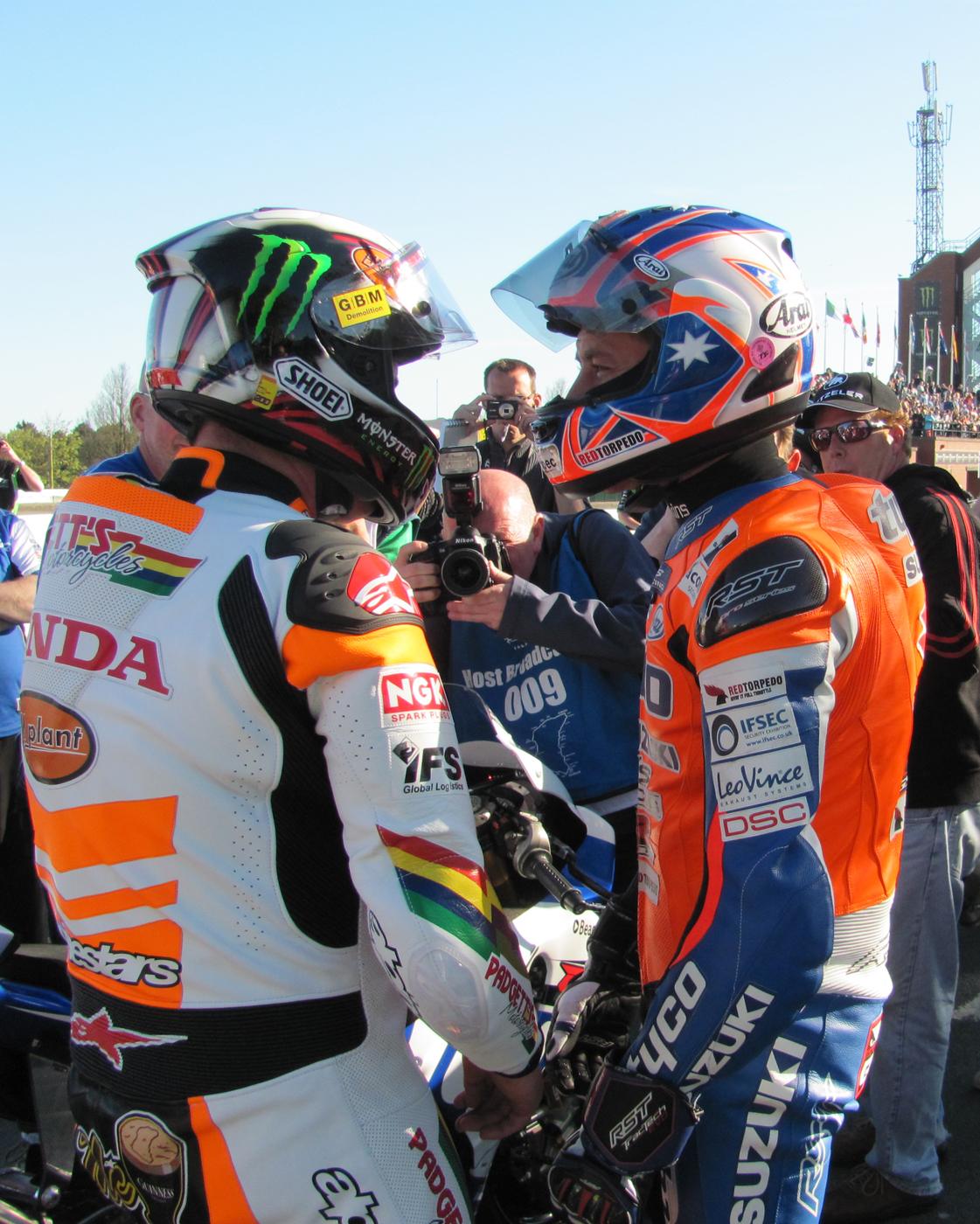
2013 Isle of Man TT winner John McGuinness with a Shoei helmet on the left

Shoei provides helmets for numerous MotoGP riders. In the MotoGP class Marc Márquez with eight Grand Prix World Championships, Álex Márquez (the younger brother of Marc Márquez), Andrea Dovizioso and Fabio Di Giannantonio. In Moto2, Thomas Lüthi, Jake Dixon and Hafizh Syahrin. In Moto3, Yuki Kunii and Deniz Öncü.

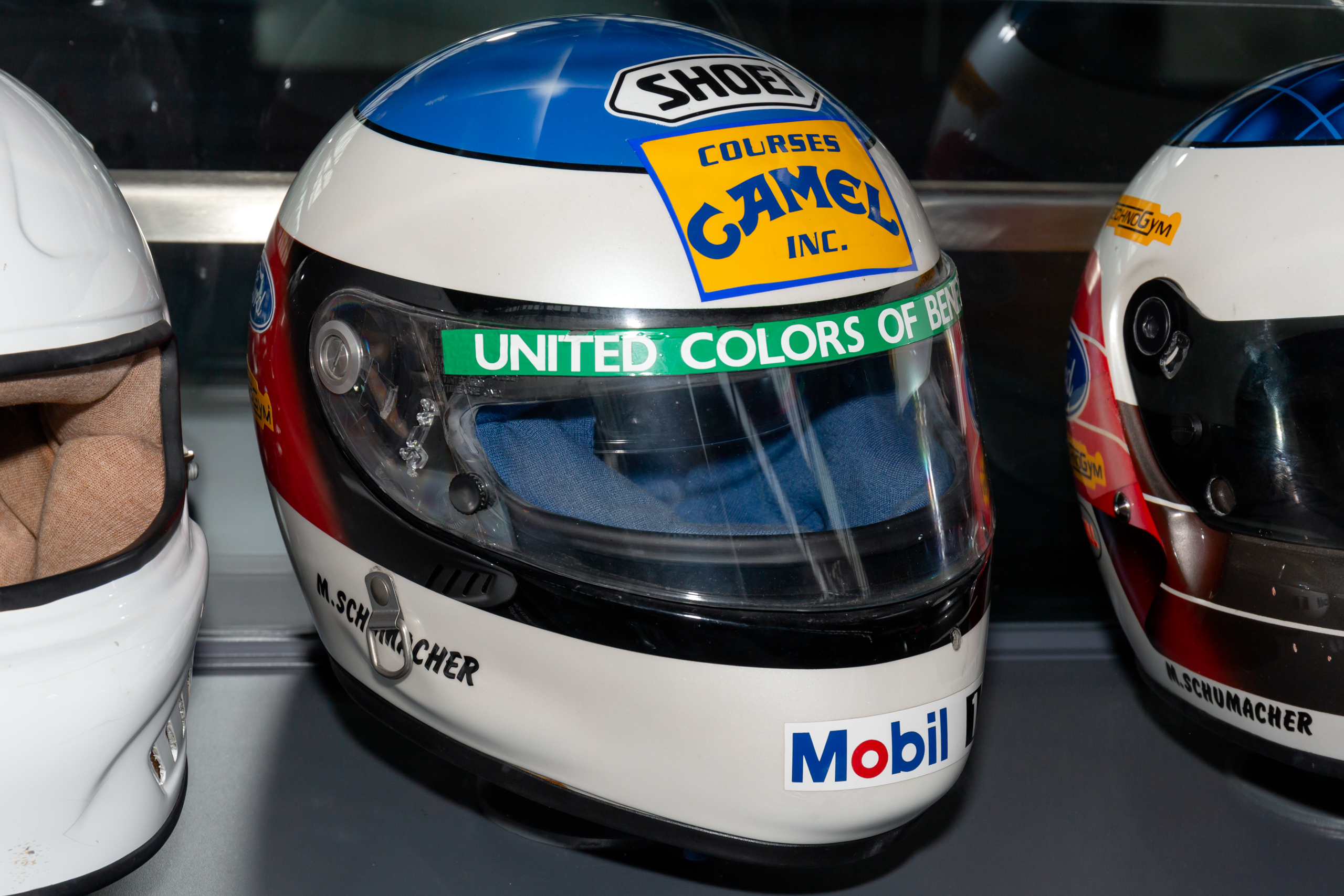
Multiple Formula 1 World Champion Michael Schumacher's Shoei helmet for 1992

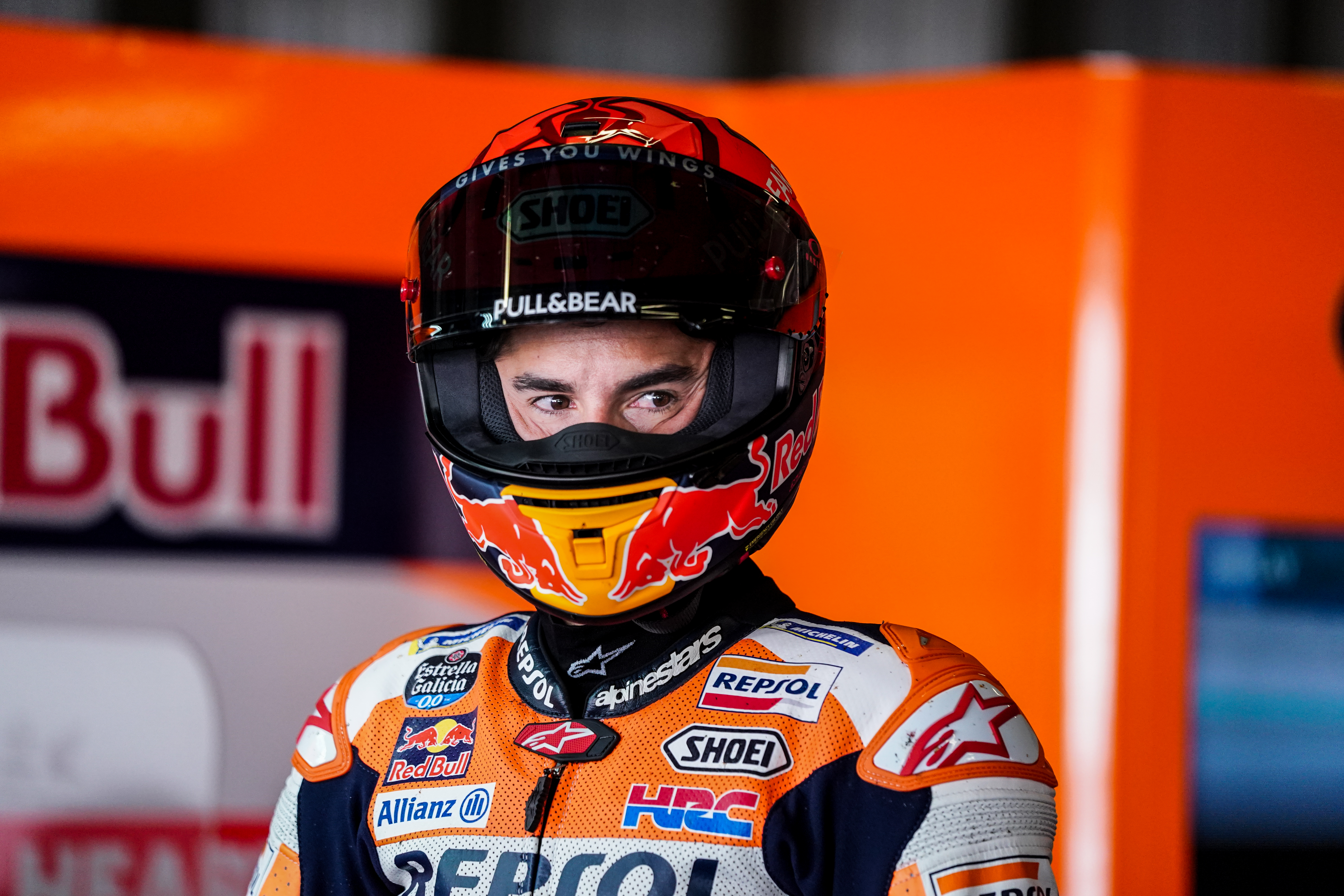
Marc Márquez with his Shoei helmet at GP de Portugal 2021

Since the foundation of the company, all Shoei helmets have been designed and manufactured in Japan, although they are distributed and sold globally.

Shoei was one of the first helmet manufacturers to introduce lightweight carbon-fibre helmets in the mid-1970s.

Shoei's GRV helmet was the first helmet to use carbon fiber and Kevlar. Shoei also created the first coverless shield system and the Dual Liner Ventilation system. The flagship X-Spirit was introduced in 2003 and was promoted by Shoei as the most advanced helmet in the world, winning MCN's Product of the Year 2003 award in the clothing category. It was followed by further development and the introduction of the RF-1000 (sold as the XR-1000 in Europe) in 2004, and the later introduction of the X-Eleven. These helmets paved the way for the current RF-1200 and X-14 models. In September 2010 the QWEST was released, the successor of the RAID II, a top-of-the-line sport touring helmet.

The NXR2 helmet is the company's first to meet the (new in 2021) ECE 22-06 standard. This standard, established by the United Nations Economic Commission for Europe, is the first update of its helmet safety standards since 2005.

== Financial effects of the Great East Japan earthquake ==
Shoei was a victim of the earthquake that struck Japan in 2011. Two factories named Iwate and Ibaraki were damaged and had to be (partially) restored. Its costs calculated on an accrual basis were estimated at around 63 million yen.

== See also ==
- SHARP (helmet ratings)
- Snell Memorial Foundation
- Bell Sports
- Arai Helmet
- AGV (helmet manufacturer)
- Simpson Performance Products
