= Arai Helmet =

Japanese manufacturing company

Arai Helmet, Limited
- Type: Joint stock company
- Industry: Motorcycle helmet, auto racing, kart racing, and helmet manufacturing
- Founder: Hirotake Arai
- Headquarters: Ōmiya-ku, Saitama, Saitama Prefecture, Japan
- Key people: Michio Arai (executive director); Akihito Arai
- Website: www.araihelmet.com

Arai Helmet Limited (株式会社 アライヘルメット, Kabushiki-gaisha Arai Herumetto) is a Japanese company that designs and manufactures motorcycle helmets and other helmets for motorsports.

The business has roots from the turn of the century involving cap production, followed by military headgear from 1930 onwards, industrial safety helmets after World War II, and finally motorcycle helmets from 1952 onward.

== History ==
Arai's origins can be traced back to the production of kepi-style caps by Yuichiro Arai in 1900. His son, Hirotake Arai (who succeeded his father in 1930), a keen motorcyclist, was approached to create a new design of sun-barrier caps for the growing Imperial Japanese Army, which was later involved in the 1934 invasion of China, the Second Sino-Japanese War, and World War II.

After production was stopped during WWII, Hirotake Arai created the Arai Sewing Machine Company, which produced and exported T-shirts and overalls in occupied Japan in the late 1940s. When Japanese construction industry unions made protective headwear compulsory, Arai produced safety helmets for construction workers, made from a resin outer shell lined with cork (which has since been substituted with expanded polystyrene). He wore an industrial safety helmet when riding his motorcycle and established a new business, the Arai Hirotake Shoten Co. Ltd. After being awarded a Japanese Industrial Standards license in 1950, Arai began manufacturing and selling the first Japanese motorcycling helmets, designated H.A. after his initials.

=== Expansion ===
Hirotake Arai's son Michio had spent time in the United States, recognizing a potential market for their helmets (which was dominated by Bell at the time). Arai was approached by New Jersey–based motorsport accessory retailer Roger Weston, who later managed the Arai Helmet Americas division, with a goal to recruit an American racer from the Daytona 200 to wear an Arai helmet. Despite approaching top American racers and with hopes of Dave Aldana agreeing, it was not until 1978 that Ted Boody Jr. became the first official Arai racer outside of Japan (followed by Freddie Spencer, the first non-Japanese Arai-contracted Grand Prix rider). Weston was also responsible for setting up the legendary dirt track racer Sammy Tanner (Sammy Tanner Distributing Inc.) in Southern California, as the first, and longest standing US distributor for the Arai Helmets. Tanner died in 2023, but his family carries on the business.

In 1983, Dutch-Belgian former motorcycle road racer Ferry Brouwer formulated a business plan to bring Arai helmets to Continental Europe, creating the Dutch Arai Europe division.

== Technical aspects ==
Arai's helmets are hand-built, with each fibre-reinforced plastic shell incorporating multiple reinforcing parts laid onto a round base (known as a "bird's nest"). Shells are assembled inside a concave metal mould, moulded using a process pioneered by Arai, inspected, and cured in a kiln before further processing and inspection.

=== Safety ===
All Arai helmets sold in the US are made to meet or exceed Snell Memorial Foundation safety standards. A number of Arai helmets meet FIA requirements for Formula One and other motorsports.

=== Arai Quantic and the new ECE 22.06 standard ===
For many years the safety standard that applied to motorcycle helmets sold in Europe had been ECE 22-05. The Economic Commission for Europe (ECE) at the United Nations developed this testing for helmet safety, UN Regulation 22. It came into force in 1982 as ECE 22-02. The fifth amendment, 22-05, took effect from March 2005. The standard mandated numerous tests in a whole host of areas: the shell, the strap, the visor, the field of vision, and so on. But perhaps the most crucial test measured a helmet's ability to absorb the energy of an impact. Unchanged since 2005, the United Nations eventually updated the standard to the newer ECE 22.06. One of the criticisms of the ECE 22-05 was that the impacts were always directed at the same five points on the helmet. Under ECE 22-06, the testers randomly choose three further test points from a selection of 12. And this is important because, under the old system, it was theoretically possible for manufacturers to reinforce their helmets in the known areas.

22-06 also measures what is known as angled impacts. It is now accepted that such blows can cause severe brain injuries as the brain potentially rotates violently inside the skull, causing tears in the brain's structure. And so 22-06 tests incorporate impacts against an anvil with a 45-degree angle. Extra sensors measure the twisting forces transmitted through the helmet to the rider's head. It was expected that under this particular test, rounder, smoother shells would perform better, and the first helmet to pass the new ECE 22.06 test was an Arai: the Quantic.

== Accolades ==
From 1999 to 2011, Arai was ranked first in customer satisfaction in all thirteen annual J. D. Power and Associates Motorcycle Helmet Satisfaction studies.

== Gallery ==
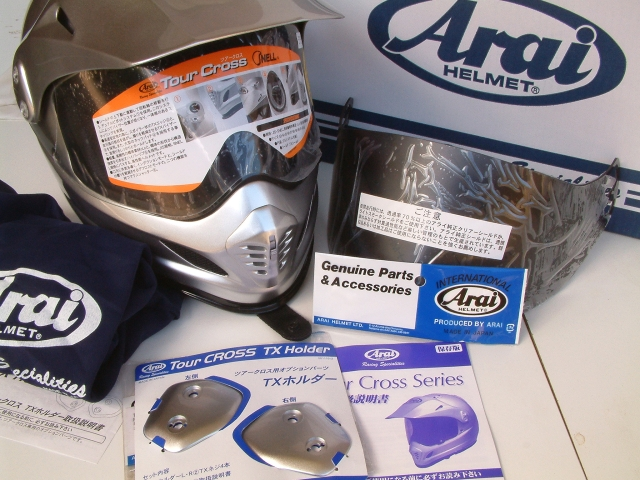
Arai XD helmet kit

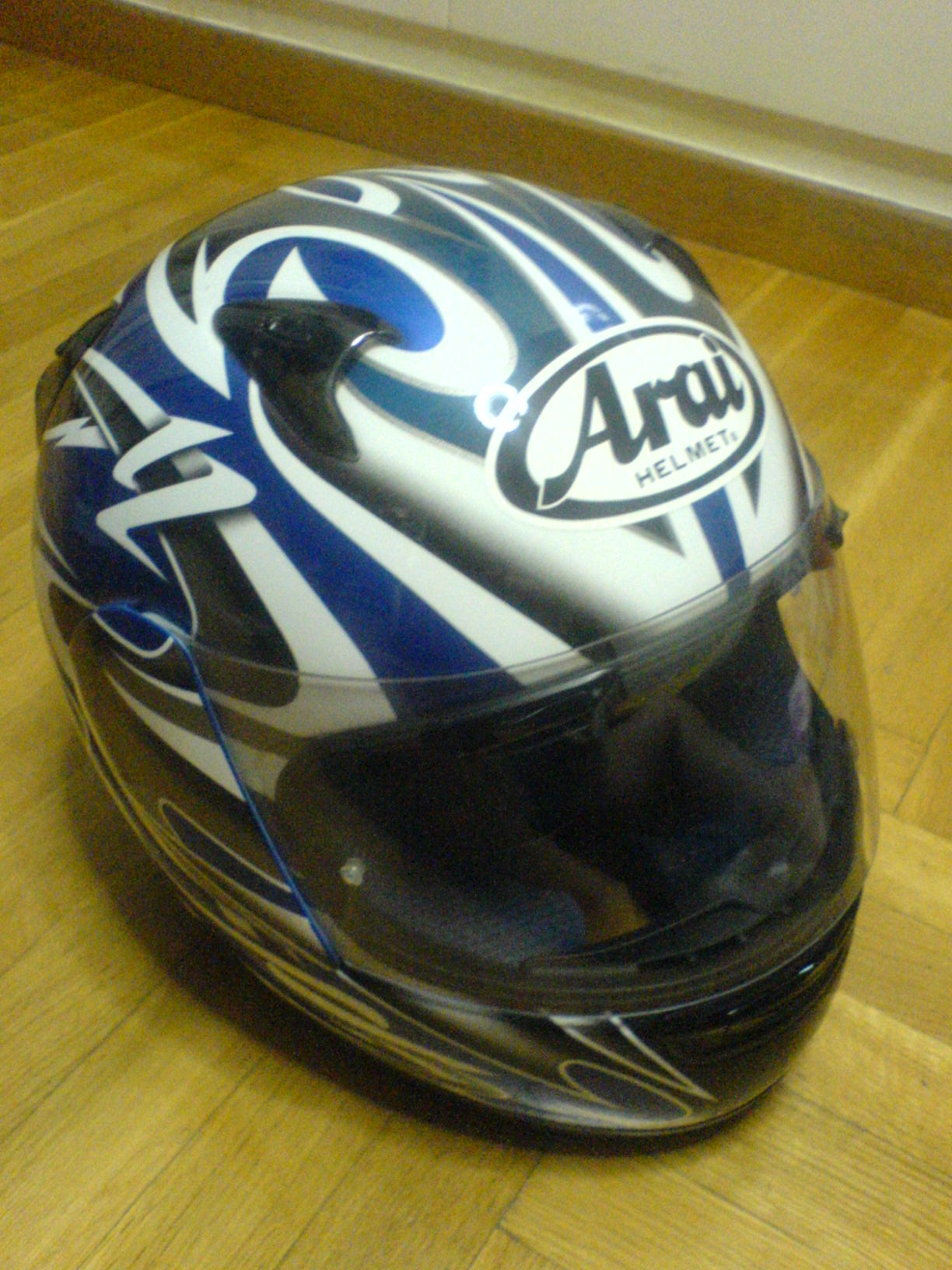
Arai Astro helmet

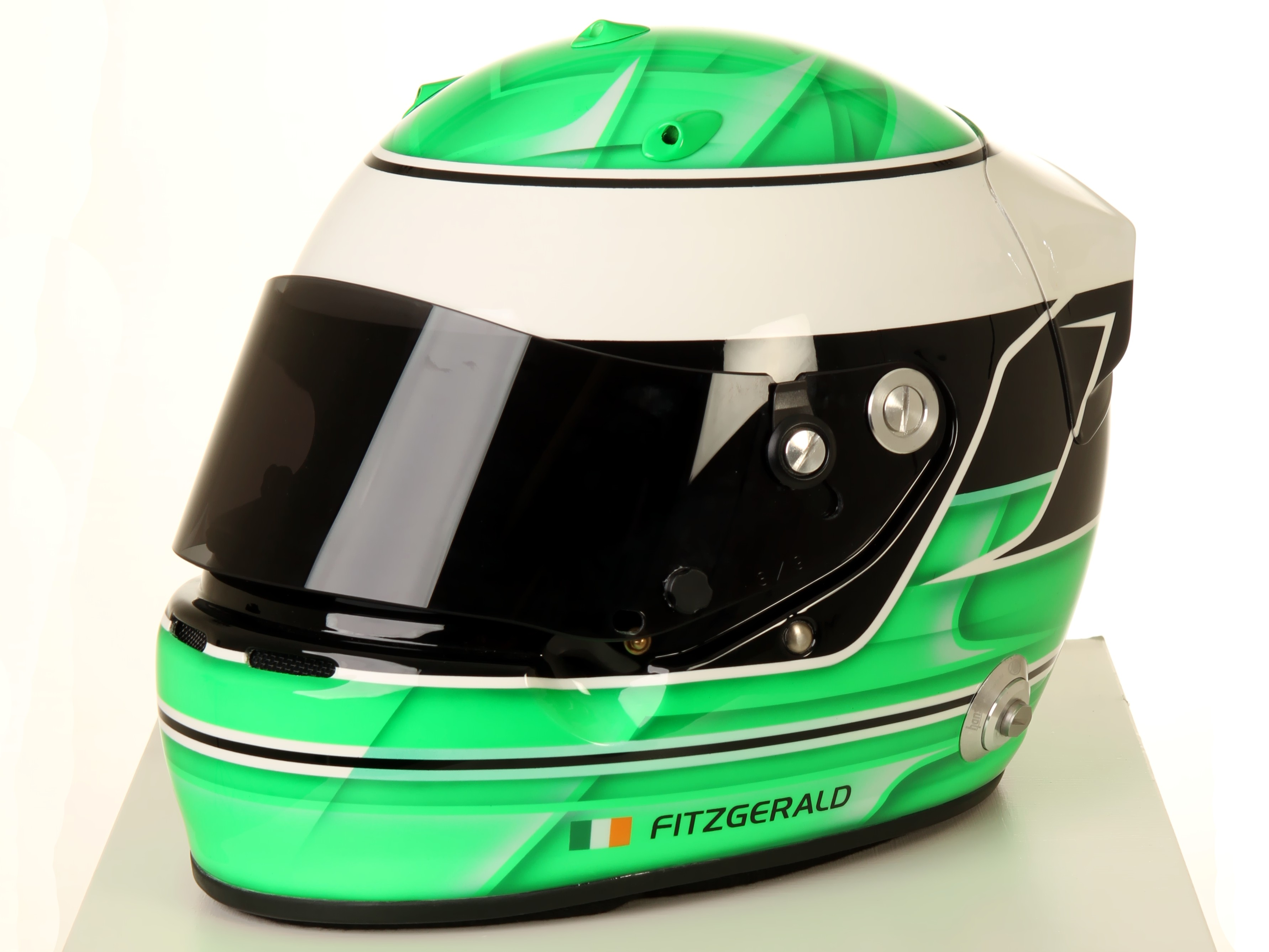
Custom-painted Arai GP5 helmet

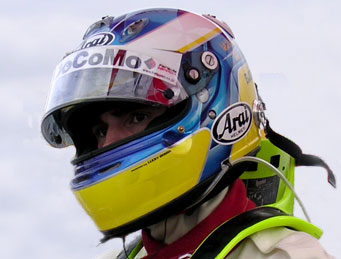
Björn Wirdheim wearing an Arai helmet

== See also ==
- SHARP (helmet ratings)
