= Shark (helmet manufacturer) =

French motorcycle helmet manufacturer

Shark Helmets
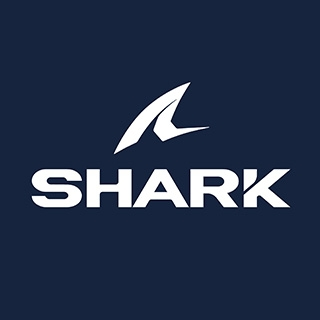
- Shark Logo
- Type: Privately held company
- Industry: Motorcycle helmet manufacturing
- Founded: 1986 in Marseilles, France
- Founder: André and Robert Teston
- Headquarters: Marseilles, France
- Key people: Christophe Merkel (CEO)
- Products: Motorcycle helmet
- Parent: 2 Ride Holding
- Website: shark-helmets.com/en_GB/

Shark is a French motorcycle helmet manufacturer based in Marseille. Shark helmets are known for their safety and meet SHARP, DOT, ECE, and FIM standards. Though the company is primarily known as a racing helmet manufacturer, they also produce urban/street helmets for commuters.

== History ==
Shark was founded in 1986 by brothers and former professional racers André and Robert Teston in Marseille, France. In 1990, Raymond Roche won the Superbike World Championship wearing a Shark helmet, which increased the brand's popularity. Shark's XRC helmet was featured in Motorrad in 1995 as the "best helmet of the year." By the end of the 1990s, Shark had opened a factory in Thailand; in 2002, they added one in Portugal.

In 2005, AtriA Capital Partners acquired 2R Holdings, which included Shark. Among its first business moves was to open a sales subsidiary in the United Kingdom; by the following year, it had expanded to Germany. In 2008, Eurazeo bought out the Teston brothers, giving the company a controlling interest of 57%. In 2011, Shark acquired the Holding Trophy Group, which held Ségura, Bering, and Bagster brands, and subsequently opened subsidiaries in Chicago, Illinois and in Dallas, Texas in the United States. That year, Perceva Capital became the controlling interest in the company, and nearly 60% of Shark's sales came from outside of France. In 2016, a factory opened in Normandy, and in 2017, Shark began branching out into outdoor sports after it acquired Lyonnais Cairn. In 2019, 2R Holdings acquired Nolan Helmets and its X Lite, Grex, and N-Com brands, increasing the company's production capacity to 800,000 helmets annually. The company launched in the Philippines in 2019.

Professional racers who have worn Shark helmets include Jorge Lorenzo, Johann Zarco, Carl Fogarty, Troy Corser, Miguel Oliveira, Scott Redding, Sam Lowes, and Jorge Martin. As of 2019, Shark helmets had been worn by nearly 70 world champions in organizations such as MotoGP, FIA World Endurance Championship, and World Superbike. Shark has sponsored the French Grand Prix every year between 2019 and 2022.

== Design and safety ==
Shark's flagship product was the Race-R PRO. In 1991, Shark became the first company to mass produce carbon-fiber lids (ACS) and both homologated full-face and open-face modular helmets. They use computational fluid dynamics to reduce "the 'buffeting effect', acoustic nuisances and the aerodynamic drag coefficient." The chinstrap on each helmet has a unique code that can be used to identify when and where it was made, most often in the event of a warranty claim.

SHARP rates the helmets 4-5 stars on average. Shark also meets DOT, ECE, and FIM standards. Part of the internal safety testing utilizes finite element methods. Biking enthusiasts rank Shark helmets in the top 10 safest brands.

Though Shark has factories in Thailand, Portugal, and Normandy, France, design work is done only in Marseille. By the end of the 1990s, Thailand primarily manufactured composite models, "the lightest and also the most expensive" part of the helmets. The Portuguese factory primarily makes "entry-level injected polycarbonate helmets." This shell is heavier than fiberglass helmets, but its thickness allows for a higher safety rating.
