= Special Escort Group (Metropolitan Police) =

Metropolitan Police unit providing mobile armed protection

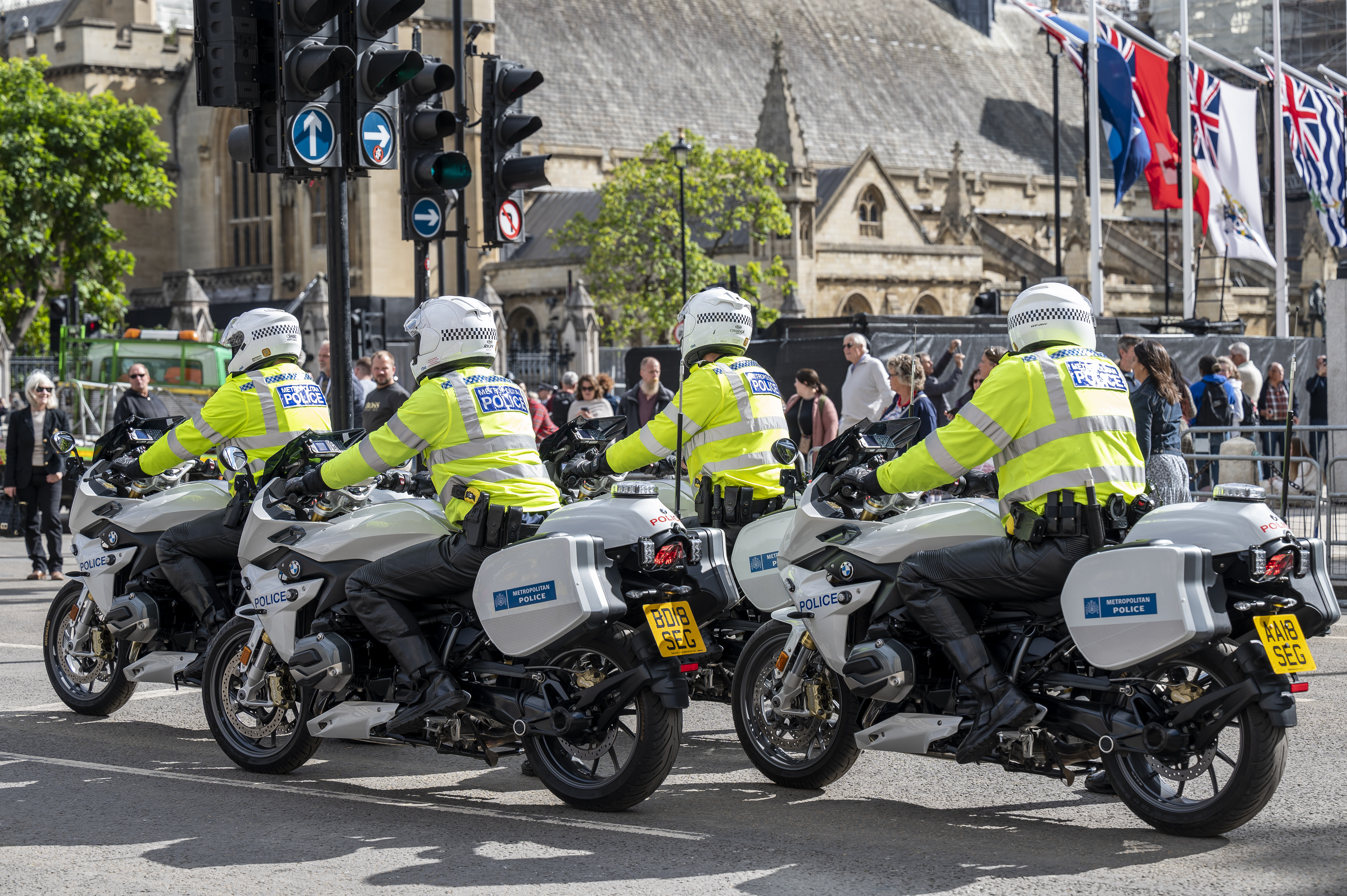
BMW R1200RS motorcycles of the Special Escort Group at Parliament Square in September 2022

The Special Escort Group (SEG) is a unit of the Metropolitan Police's Royalty and Specialist Protection (RaSP) branch of Protection Command.

== Roles ==
The SEG provides mobile armed protection to the royal family and close protection to government officials and visiting diplomats and heads of state, as well as armed vehicle escorts for category A prisoners and high-value loads.

== History ==
The Special Escort Group (SEG) was formed in November 1952 to prepare a police escort for the visit of Yugoslav leader Josip Broz Tito in March 1953. Because the visit was not a full state visit, a cavalry escort was not planned. Inspector Arthur Proctor Tisdall BEM selected and trained 22 motorcycle officers at Hendon Police College for the assignment.

Sergeant John Baldwin took charge after Inspector Day retired in 1963. At Winston Churchill’s state funeral in January 1965, SEG officers escorted visiting dignitaries to St Paul’s Cathedral as part of a tightly timed procession. Baldwin deployed 24 experienced officers and a reserve of trained riders.

At the 1997 funeral of Diana, Princess of Wales, 12 SEG officers escorted the hearse from central London to Althorp, with the group retaining responsibility across police force boundaries.

The SEG provided the motorcycle escort for the Queen's coffin during its movement by road for the funeral on 19 September 2022. This was the largest security operation mounted in Britain for decades.

== Methods ==
During an escort, the lead rider, known as the “easy rider”, sets the convoy’s pace while other riders move ahead to manage traffic.

SEG motorcycle officers carry firearms. A kit list released by the Met in 2025 includes concealed body armour, firearms-related equipment, high-visibility clothing and motorcycle protective gear.

VIPEX (“VIP Escort”) is a police motorcycle escort course and system. Staffordshire Police describes it as involving at least four qualified riders escorting a convoy of two to five cars carrying armed protection officers and VIPs.

== Motorcycles ==
The group’s early motorcycles were Triumphs, included the Triumph Speed Twin 5T, followed by the Thunderbird 6T (1959–1967) and TR6 Trophy (1967–1980).

In 1980 they moved to BMW Motorrad with the R80/7 (1980–1990), K100 (1990–1997), R1100/R1150RS (1997–2012).

In 2012 the SEG moved to Honda VFR1200, but returned to BMW boxer twins in 2018 with the BMW R1200RS. The SEG favours the sport-touring RS models because they are slimmer and more agile for filtering through dense London traffic during high-speed escort operations.

The SEG's motorcycles are deliberately less conspicuous than many standard UK police motorcycles. They are mainly a plain white livery with the word POLICE on the fairing and Metropolitan Police sicker on the panniers. They do not have the high-visibility yellow-and-blue Battenburg patterning used on normal roads-policing motorcycles. They also do not use sirens, relying on Acme Thunderer whistles instead. PC Trevor Pryke of the SEG introduced whistles for directing traffic; they are also shown being used to attract road users’ attention.

=== Other vehicles ===
In 1976, cars and firearms were introduced into many escorts in response to the increasing terrorist threat from the IRA which drove major changes in protection and escort tactics. During that period, police protection units across London increasingly adopted armored and specialist vehicles. The SEG began using a Range Rover as the rear escort vehicle in the convoy. Modern SEG fleets include escort cars such as BMW 530D saloons and Range Rover escort vehicles in addition to BMW motorcycles.

=== Equipment ===
In October 2025, the Met disclosed a kit list for SEG motorcycle riders. It included two alternative helmet types: a Shoei GT-Air with communications equipment or a white Arai RX-7V with communications equipment. It also lists high-visibility clothing, firearms and motorcycle protective gear.
