= Racing helmet =

Form of protective headgear

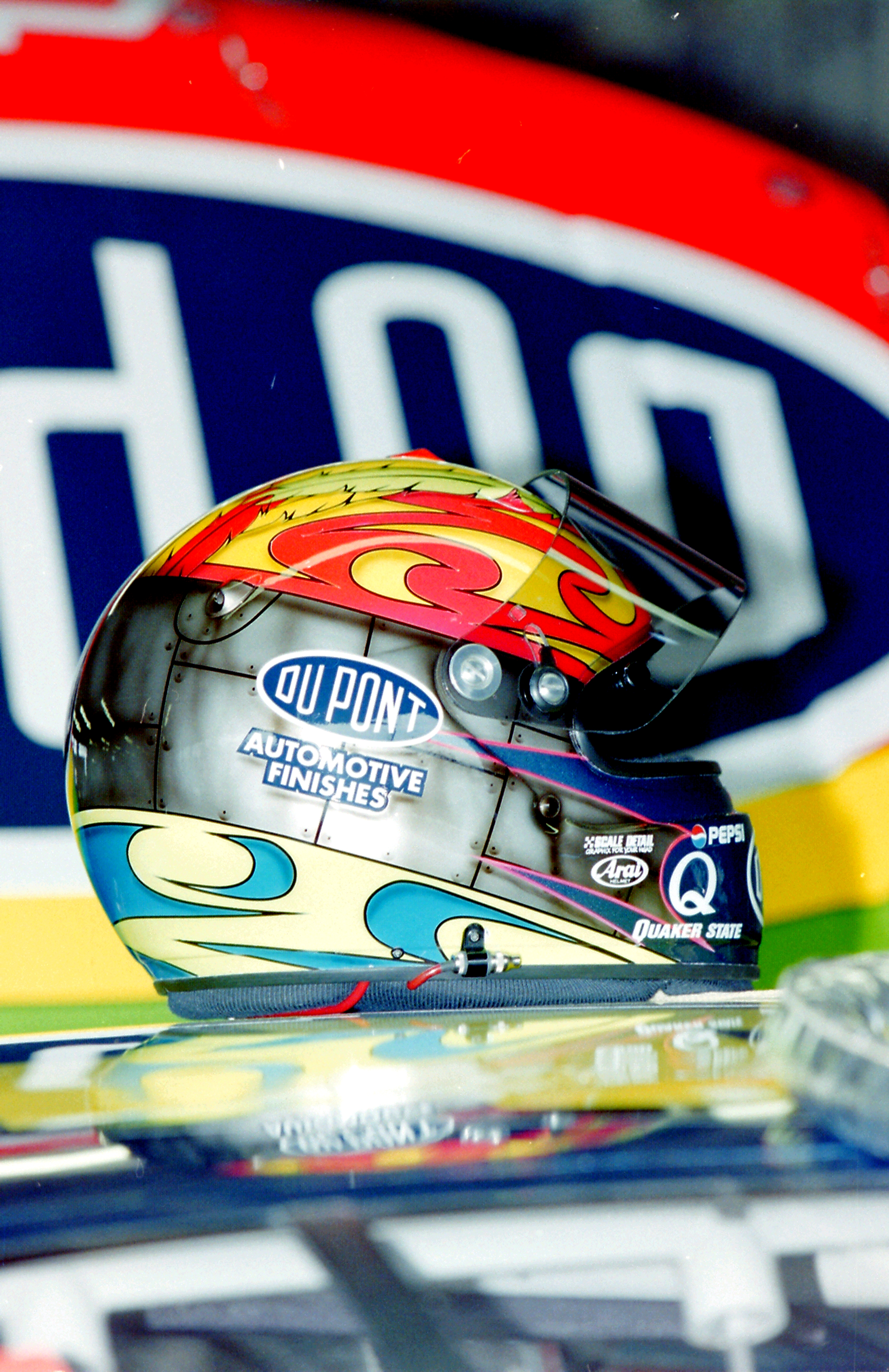
Jeff Gordon's racing helmet

A racing helmet is a form of protective headgear worn by racing car and rally drivers. Motor racing has long been known to be an exceptionally risky sport: sudden deceleration forces on the head can easily occur if a racing car loses control at the very high speeds of competitive motor racing or the rough terrain experienced in rallying. A risk more nearly unique to motor racing is the possibility of drastically severe burns from fuel igniting when the fuel lines or fuel tank of the vehicle are jolted sufficiently to dislodge or breach them in a situation in which the driver cannot soon enough escape from his car. This happened to world champion driver Niki Lauda at the 1976 German Grand Prix race at the Nürburgring in a crash from which he barely escaped alive.

It is known that the percentage of racing accidents resulting in hospitalisation in motor racing, at around 25 percent, is higher than any other major international sport and that the average period in hospital is the longest. A recent Australian study also suggests motor racing may have the highest rate of actual injury among major sports. However, a study conducted between 1996 and 2000 by Fuji Toranomon Orthopaedic Hospital in Shizuoka suggests that only a small proportion of these injuries are actually to the head or surrounding areas.

== History ==
Analogous to gridiron football, cloth or leather helmets with goggles to protect drivers’ eyes from dust were used by many pre-World War I racing drivers and already in 1914 the Auto Cycle Union made helmets compulsory for drivers of its racing vehicles. However, these helmets did nothing to prevent massive head injuries or burns during the numerous crashes encountered even when races were moved onto private tracks.

In the period following the war, concern about head injuries in motor racing continued to grow much faster than efforts to design safer helmets. Some racing drivers in the 1920s and 1930s were known to wear football or fire-fighting helmets as these offered better protection than standard racing headdresses of the time. Even though hard-shell helmets were used in motorcycle racing during the 1930s, it was not until the 1950s that a hard-shell helmet specifically designed for motor racing emerged, and extremely soon after the first metal helmets were developed, Formula One made helmets of this type compulsory for all drivers. NASCAR, however, did not make full-face helmets compulsory until after the death of Dale Earnhardt in 2001.

Although helmets had been mandatory in other races beforehand, the new technology greatly improved safety and allowed the use of higher speeds. Bell Sports developed the first mass-produced auto-racing helmet in 1954.

By the end of the 1950s, full-face crash helmets were regarded as essential equipment for drivers in all forms of motor racing, and the Snell Memorial Foundation developed the first auto racing helmet standards in 1959. Since that time, the alternative standard to that of Snell has been that of the Fédération Internationale de l'Automobile, whose standards are used in Grand Prix racing. The Safety Helmet Council of America also developed a race-car helmet standard in the 1970s, but currently only provides certification to the Department of Transportation which does not certify racing car helmets.

Since racing helmets became general standard equipment, there have been many improvements made to their design to cope with the increases in power and speed of racing cars. The most recent of these has been the development of flexible “tethers” so that a head inside the helmet cannot snap forward or to the side during a wreck.

=== Racing helmets in Formula One ===
- 1952 season: Racing helmets were made mandatory in Formula One.
- 1968 German Grand Prix: Dan Gurney became the first Formula One driver to wear a full face helmet.
- 1969 Monaco Grand Prix: Graham Hill became the first Formula One winner to wear a full face helmet.
- 1970 Italian Grand Prix: Clay Regazzoni became the last Formula One winner to wear an open-face helmet.
- 1974 Swedish Grand Prix: Leo Kinnunen became the last Formula One driver to wear an open-face helmet.

== Construction ==
In most respects, auto racing helmets are not dissimilar to motorcycle helmets in construction, since they have similar requirements of protecting against extremely high-speed collisions. Modern racing helmets have an outer shell of carbon fiber, an inner shell of thick polystyrene and padding which must be in contact with the wearer’s head.

There are, however, several major differences that make the two types of helmets non-interchangeable:

1. Motorcycle helmets do not need fire protection because at high speed the rider will fly far from a burning motorcycle. In contrast, auto racing helmets must have fire protection since a driver is not likely to be able to escape if a car catches fire.
2. Auto racing helmets can have a narrower field of view for greater head protection than is possible in a motorcycle helmet, especially when the driver is following a clearly defined track. For this reason, many auto racing helmets are illegal to use on a motorcycle over public roads.
3. Auto racing helmets must be tested for sharp collisions with a roll bar which a motorcyclist is not likely to encounter.

The fire-proof material used in racing helmets occurs in the inner lining and is known as Nomex, having been first introduced to racing helmets in 1967. In the 1960s and 1970s as crash fireproofing developed, concern became raised that in ordinary use racing helmets offered very little ventilation because they have more complete head coverage than any other type of helmet. Practical solutions to this problem were not developed until the 1980s when thermoelectric cooling was developed; however, most customers and governing bodies have preferred alternative less sophisticated means of improving ventilation over the past thirty years.

== Personalised designs ==
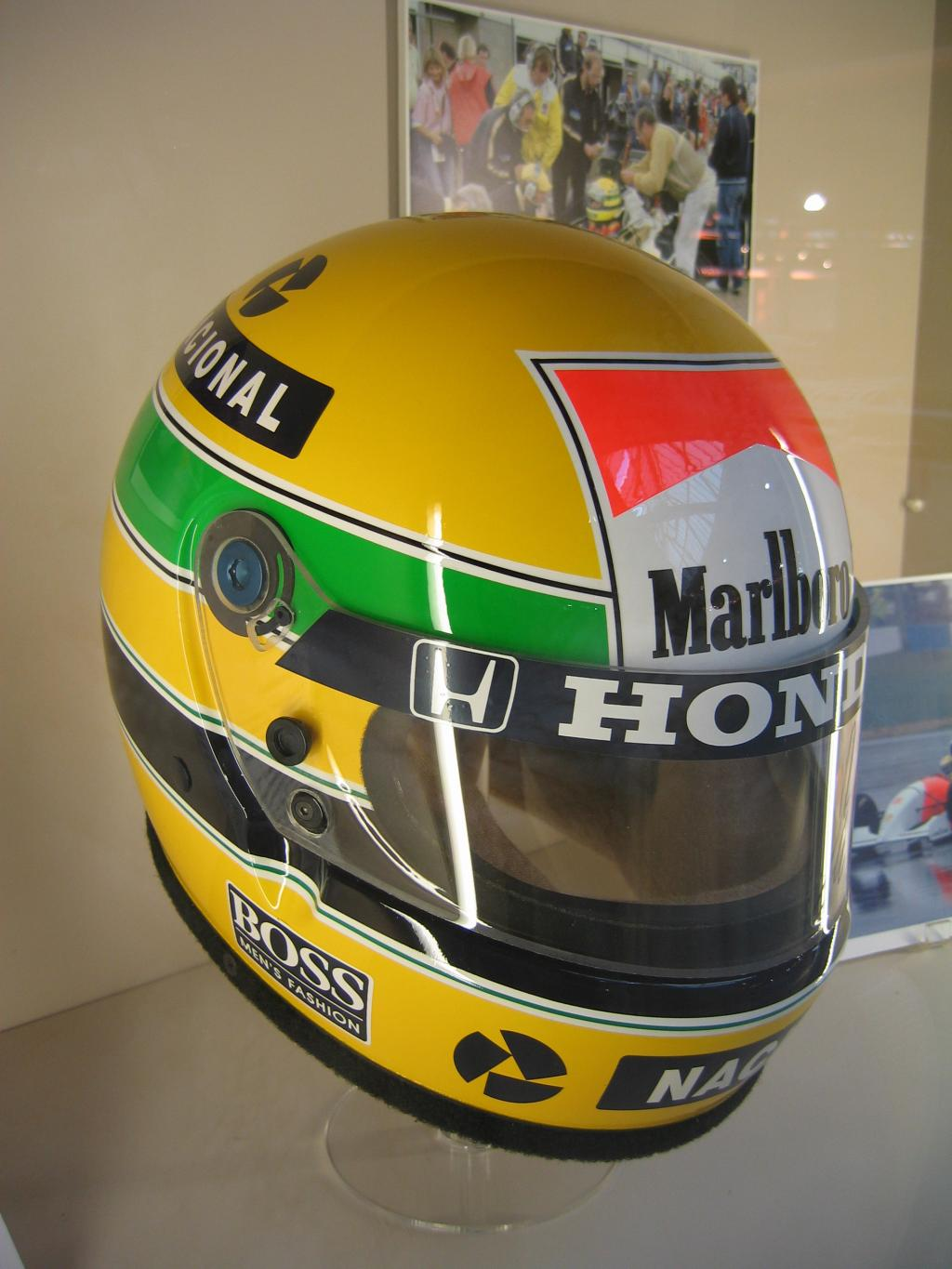
Ayrton Senna's helmet

Many drivers – especially in open-topped cars such as Formula One cars – will have bright, vivid designs to help distinguish them from other drivers. These designs will traditionally remain with the driver throughout their career, although in 2015 the FIA introduced rules limiting F1 drivers to one design per season to curb a recent trend towards regularly changing the design. This rule was removed from the FIA regulations for the 2020 Formula One season following criticism from F1 drivers and fans.

== See also ==
- Motorcycle helmet
