= Reported Road Casualties Great Britain =

Statistical publication on traffic casualties in the UK

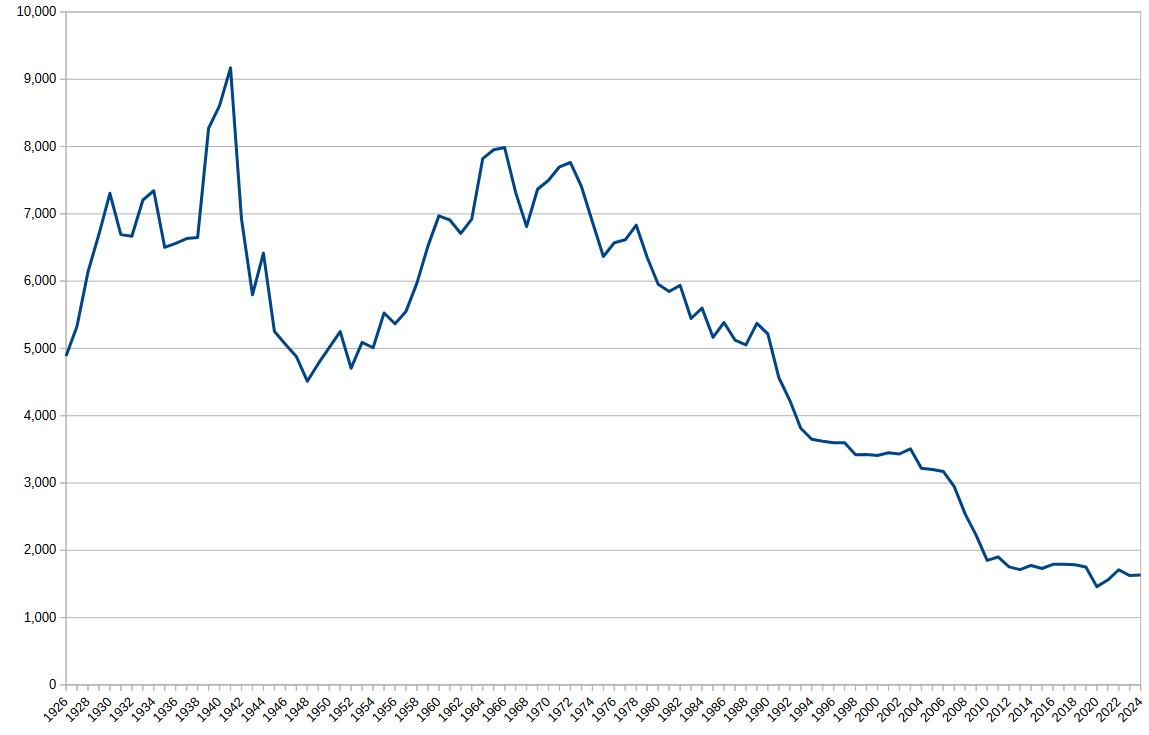
Annual numbers of people killed on the roads of Great Britain between 1926 and 2024

Reported Road Casualties Great Britain (RRCGB), formerly Road Casualties Great Britain (RCGB) and before that Road Accidents Great Britain (RAGB), is the official statistical publication of the UK Department for Transport (DfT) on traffic casualties, fatalities and related road safety data. This publication, first produced in 1951, is the primary source for data on road casualties in Great Britain. It is based primarily on police STATS19 data. Data has been collected since 1926.

The remainder of the UK casualty statistics, those from Northern Ireland, are reported separately by the Police Service of Northern Ireland.

== Published data ==
Data has been collected since 1926, in which year there were 4,886 fatalities in some 124,000 reported injury crashes. (Note: Department for Transport (2006), p. 92 'Road accident and casualty data was first collect on a national level in 1926. That year there were 4,886 recorded deaths in some 124,000 accidents') Between 1951 and 2006 a total of 309,144 people were killed and 17.6 million were injured in accidents on British roads. (Note: Department for Transport (2006) p. 1 'Between 1951 and 2006, 309,144 people were killed and 17.6 million persons were injured in accidents on British roads') The highest number of deaths in any one year was 9,169 people in 1941 during World War II. The highest figure during peacetime was 7,985 in 1966. (Note: Department for Transport (2008), p. 106 table 2)

Figures for reported deaths, serious injuries and slight injuries have generally decreased since 1966. Since 1992, the ten-year drop in killed or seriously injured casualty numbers reported to the police, compared with the previous five-year average, has been about 40%. Increased safety features on cars have helped reduce the number of deaths and serious injuries, beginning with the introduction of seatbelts as compulsory equipment in the front of all new cars sold from 1972 onwards (although it was not compulsory for them to be worn until 1983). Rear seatbelts became compulsory on all new cars sold from 1986 onwards. Airbags first started to become a popular feature on new cars from around 1993, with other features including antilock brakes already being widely available by this stage. The gradual fall in the number of vehicles in use from before these features became compulsory or at least widely available also had a long-term effect on reducing casualties.

In 1987, prompted by a BBC TV documentary ("The biggest epidemic of our times") the roads minister Peter Bottomley set the first national casualty reduction target aiming to cut road casualties by a third by the year 2000 in comparison to the years 1981 to 1985. The target was exceeded, with the number of fatalities dropping by 39% and the number of serious injuries dropping by 45% over that period.

In 1999, when Great Britain had the safest roads in Europe apart from Sweden, the government set a new national casualty reduction target, to be met by the year 2010. The target for 2010, compared to the average for the years 1994 to 1998, was a reduction of 40% in the number of people Killed or Seriously Injured (KSI) casualties, a reduction of 50% the number of children KSI casualties and a reduction of 10% in the rate of people slightly injured per 100 million vehicle kilometres. By 2009, the results were: killed or seriously injured 44% lower; children killed or seriously injured 61% lower and the slight casualty rate was 37% lower. (Note: Department for Transport (2009) p. 8 Compared with the 1994 to 1998 average, in 2009: The number killed was 38% lower; The number of reported killed or seriously injured casualties was 44% lower; The number of children killed or seriously injured was 61% lower; and the slight casualty rate was 37% lower. In contrast, traffic rose by an estimated 15% over this period)

The number of vehicles on the roads of Great Britain has increased from about 4 million in 1950 to over 34 million in 2010. Passenger kilometres travelled increased from around 50 million in 1952 to more than 600 million in 2023.

The department also publishes a series of vulnerable road user factsheets alongside the main annual report, covering motorcyclists, pedal cyclists, pedestrians and e-scooter users. The 2025 factsheets reported 386 motorcyclist deaths and 79 pedal cyclist deaths in Great Britain.

There is some concern about the completeness of the injury data and what can be concluded from it (see the Criticism section below). This table gives data for sample years:-

=== Annual summary ===
Year	Killed	Serious injury	Slight injury	Total injury	ref	Note
1926	4,886					First year that national figures were published.
1930	7,305			178,000		
1935	6,522			218,798		
1936	6,489			225,689		For the 52 week period ending on 26 December 1936.
1940	8,609					No figures for injured during World War II.
1941	9,169					Highest recorded fatality rate.
1950	5,012	49,000	148,000	196,000		
1960	6,970			341,000		
1966	7,985					Highest recorded peacetime fatality rate.
1970	7,499			356,000		
1980	5,953			323,000		
1983	5,445			308.584		Legal requirement to wear seatbelts in front of cars starts from January 31, 1983
1990	5,217	60,000	275,000	336,000		
1991	4,568			311,668		Legal requirement for adults to wear seatbelts in rear of cars starts in 1991
1997	3,599			324,000		
1998	3,421	41,000	281,000	322,000		
1999	3,423	39,000	278,000	317,000		
2000	3,409	38,000	279,000	317,000		
2001	3,450	37,000	273,000	310,000		
2002	3,431	36,000	263,000	299,000		
2003	3,508	34,000	253,000	287,000		
2004	3,221	31,000	245,000	278,000		
2005	3,201	29,000	238,862	268,000		
2006	3,172	29,000	226,559	255,000	(Note: Department for Transport (2008), p. 6)	
2007	2,946	28,000	217,060	245,000		
2008	2,538	26,000	202,333	228,000		
2009	2,222	24,690	195,234	222,146	(Note: Department for Transport (2009), p. 8 There were a total of 222,146 reported casualties of all severities, 4% lower than in 2008. 2,222 people were killed, 12% lower than in 2008, 24,690 were seriously injured (down 5%) and 195,234 were slightly injured (down 4%))	
2010	1,857	20,803	185,995	206,798		Traffic levels fell by 2%.
2011	1,901	23,122	178,927	203,950		First increase in fatalities since 2001. Pedestrian fatalities increased by 12%, car occupants by 6%. They were lower for all other groups.
2012	1,754	23,039	170,930	193,969		10% increase in deaths of cyclists and increasing serious injuries of pedestrians.
2013	1,713	21,657	160,300	181,957		Lowest death rate since records began.
2014	1,775	22,807	169,895	194,477		Death and KSI rate rise for a 2nd time since 2001.
2015	1,732	22,137	162,340	186,209		Second lowest annual total on record after 2013.
2016	1,792	24,101	155,491	179,592		4% rise in deaths to highest level since 2011.
2017	1,793	24,831	144,369	170,993		
2018	1,782	25,484	133,112	160,378		
2019	1,752	25,945 **(30,144)**	125,461 **(121,262)**	153,158		Comparison of this figure with earlier years should be interpreted with caution due to changes in systems for severity reporting by some police forces. The numbers given in **bold** are adjusted estimates following methodology from the Office for National Statistics Methodology Advisory Service analysis accounting for change in severity reporting (see page 7).
2020	1,460	20,102 **(22,069)**	92,055 **(94,022)**	115,584		Figures affected by Covid19 pandemic
2021	1,558	23,363 **(25,892)**	103,288 **(100,759)**	128,209		
2022	1,711	28,031	105,738	135,480		
2023	1,624	28,087	103,266	132,977		
2024	1,633	27,904	98,838	128,375		Provisional figures released May 29, 2025

=== Casualties by road type in 2008 ===
Casualties by severity, built-up, non built-up and on motorways. (Note: Department for Transport (2008), p. 121 table 12 'Reported accidents, vehicles and casualties: casualties by severity: by road class, built-up and non built-up roads: 2008')

Road type	Killed	Serious injury	Slight injury	Total injury	Ref.	Note
Non built-up (excludes motorways)	1,323	8,342	48,810	58,475		52% of the total killed, 32% of total seriously injured, 25% of total with slight injuries
Built-up	1,057	16,823	143,079	160,959		42% of the total killed, 65% of total seriously injured, 70% of total with slight injuries
Motorway	158	869	10,444	11,471		"6% of the total killed, 3% of total seriously injured, 5% of total with slight injuries. Fatalities on motorways have decreased by 9% since 1994–98 in a period with traffic levels increased by 28%"
**All casualties**	**2,538**	**26,034**	**202,333**	**230,905**		

== STATS19 data collection system ==
The police collect details of all incidents which they attend or become aware of within 30 days which occur on the highway in which one or more person is killed or injured and involving one or more vehicles using the STATS19 data collection system.

STATS19 is the reference number for the police form used to record incidents. STATS20 describes how to complete the form giving examples of how to correctly record different situations. STATS21 describes how STATS19 data should be checked for accuracy.

Additional information for RCGB is gathered from death registrations, coroners' reports and traffic and vehicle registrations.

STATS19 data is used in European Union road safety studies.

== Criticism ==
=== Reported reduction in injury levels ===
The accuracy of the police STATS19 statistics, and thus much of the data published in the RCGB, and therefore its suitability for measuring trends in road casualties was examined in two studies in 2006 and has subsequently been commented on by the Department for Transport who concluded that the figures for deaths were accurate, however the actual total injuries is likely considerably higher than the reported figure, possibly three times higher.

A report published in the British Medical Journal in 2006 by M.Gill et al. compared police and Hospital Episode Statistics between 1996 and 2004 and concluded that although the police statistics showed a reduction in KSIs from 85.9 to 59.4 per 100,000 for the period the statistics for hospital admissions related to traffic accidents requiring hospital admission for the period did not. It concluded that the overall fall in police figures represented a fall in completeness of reporting of these injuries rather than an actual reduction of casualties.

Also in 2006 a report prepared for the DfT by H. Ward et al. noted that although the figures for fatalities were normally accurate, with no significant under-reporting there was more uncertainty in the statistics relating to injury. They recommended that it was insufficient to rely solely on the STATS19 data or any other single data source because different databases showed different elements of the story and that "A system of data triangulation should be used to compare and understand trends in road casualties." They noted that the definition of seriously injured in police reports was at least partially subjective, and there was some under-reporting (though less than is the case for lesser injuries). The report also noted that there were changes to the method used to estimate vehicle mileages in 1995 which would affect direct comparisons of figures spanning this year.

The Department for Transport acknowledged in their report for the year 2008 that a considerable proportion of non-fatal casualties are not known to the police. Based on additional sources including hospital records, surveys and compensation claims they estimate that the total number of road casualties in Great Britain each year is nearer to 800,000 (although this figure itself may be influenced by the growth in the so-called 'compensation culture'). The UK government is not convinced however that the reductions in reported injury levels do not reflect an actual decline. (Note: Department for Transport (2008), p. 62. "It has long been known that a considerable proportion of non-fatal casualties are not known to the police and hospital, survey and compensation claims data all indicate a higher number of casualties than are reported ... Police data on road accidents (STATS19), whilst not perfect, remains the most detailed, complete and reliable single source of information on road casualties covering the whole of Great Britain, in particular for monitoring trends over time".) In 2008 the department changed the title of the report from "Road Casualties Great Britain" to "Reported Road Casualties Great Britain".

=== Suppression of activity by vulnerable road users ===
Another independent report challenged the government's claim that falling casualty rates meant that roads were becoming "much safer". Mayer Hillman, John Adams and John Whitelegg suggest that roads may actually be felt to be sufficiently dangerous as to deter people from using them. They compared rates for those whose transport options are most limited, the elderly and children and found that:

- Britain's child pedestrian safety record is worse than the average for Europe, in contrast to the better than average all-ages figure.
- Children's independent mobility is increasingly curtailed, with fear of traffic being cited as a dominant cause.
- Distances walked have declined more than in other European countries.
- Similar (though less well-defined) observations can be made regarding the elderly.

== Sources ==
- Department for Transport (2006). "Road Casualties Great Britain: 2006 - Annual Report" (PDF). Road Casualties Great Britain. Archived from the original (PDF) on 9 February 2010.
- Department for Transport (2008). "Reported Road Casualties Great Britain: 2008 Annual Report" (PDF). Road Casualties Great Britain. Archived from the original (PDF) on 12 September 2011.
- Department for Transport (2009). "Reported Road Casualties Great Britain: 2009 Annual Report" (PDF). Road Casualties Great Britain.
