= Pressure bag moulding =

Plastic moulding process

Pressure bag moulding is a process for moulding reinforced plastics. This process is related to vacuum bag molding.

== Procedure ==
A solid female mold is used along with a flexible male mold. The reinforcement is placed inside the female mold with just enough resin to permit the fabric to stick in place (wet lay-up). A measured amount of resin is then liberally brushed indiscriminately into the mold and the mold is then clamped to a machine that includes the male flexible mold. Then, the flexible male membrane is inflated with heated compressed air or possibly steam. The female mold can also be heated. Excess resin is forced out along with trapped air. Due to the lower cost of unskilled labor, this method is used extensively in the production of composite helmets. For a helmet bag moulding machine, cycle times vary from 20 to 45 minutes, but if the molds are heated, the finished shells require no further curing.
