= Non-motorist =

Road user not travelling inside a vehicle

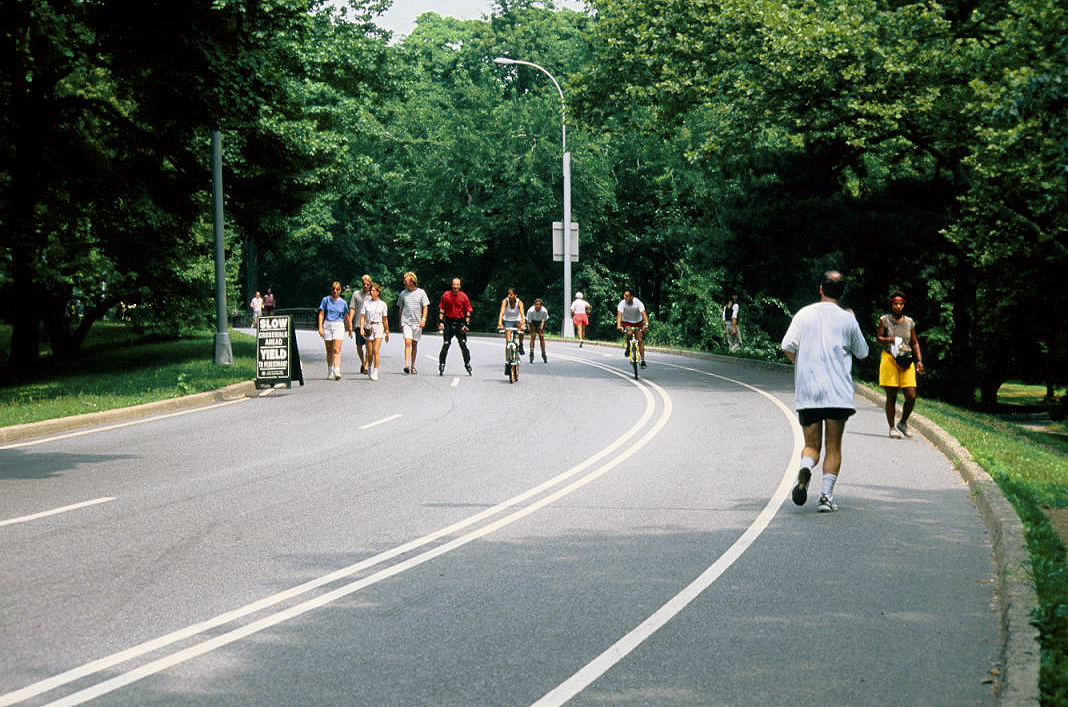
Pedestrians and cyclists are both non-motorist road users.

A non-motorist is a road user not in a motor vehicle, i.e. someone who is either travelling on foot or riding in a human-/animal-powered vehicle. This group includes pedestrians, cyclists, kick scooters, rollerbladers and skateboarders, skiers, pushchairs, wheelchairs or kicksledders, and much less commonly horse riders and carts.

Non-motorists typically travel at a much slower speed than motorists, and in the event of a traffic collision, especially against motor vehicles, they are not physically protected by anything more than personal protective gears (if wearing any at all), usually only a helmet. In the field of traffic management and road safety, they are often studied as a separate group, especially in road collisions.

== Term usage ==
The term "non-motorist" is also sometimes used in connection with potentially less health and environmental impacts, since most non-motorists neither consume fossil fuels nor contribute to greenhouse gas emission or air pollution that can lead to hazardous weather conditions such as smogs and acid rain. Reduced reliance on motor vehicles is also considered to be associated with a more active and healthier lifestyle.

=== Norway ===
In Norwegian, the term myk trafikant (literally meaning "soft road user", that is vulnerable road user) is used, and it sometimes also includes light motorists such as moped riders and motorcyclists since they have much less protection than car passengers, who are completely surrounded by a rigid structure with safety features, such as seatbelts and airbags, that can absorb the forces of impact.

== See also ==
- Alternatives to car use
- Carfree city
- Car-free movement
- Cyclability
- Mass transit
- Reclaim the Streets
- Street reclamation
- Vision Zero – Multinational road traffic safety project
- Walkability
- Walking city
