= Snell Memorial Foundation =

Helmet safety standards organization

- Company type: Nonprofit organization
- Founded: 1957
- Headquarters: North Highlands, California
- Key people: Executive Director Stephen Johnson
- Services: Helmet safety research, testing, certification, and education
- Website: smf.org

The Snell Memorial Foundation is a nonprofit organization created to provide a high quality standard of safety for helmets. Founded in 1957, the foundation is named after William "Pete" Snell, a popular sports car racer who died in 1956 of head injuries he received when the racing helmet he wore failed to protect his head. A group of friends, scientists, physicians, and others joined to create a group that would promote research and education as well as test and develop standards to improve the effectiveness of helmets.

== Standards ==
- B-95 Bicycle helmets
- B-95C Children's bicycle helmets
- E2001 Equestrian helmets
- H2000 Harness racing helmets
- L-98 Mopeds and Low Powered Vehicles
- M2015 Motorcycle helmets
- M2020 Helmet Standard for Motorcycling
- N-94 Undefined or general use helmets used in sports and industry
- RS-98 Recreational Skiing & Snowboarding helmets
- SA2005 Auto racing helmets
- SA2015 — 2015 Helmet Standard For Use in Competitive Automotive Sports
- SA2020 Helmet Standard for Automotive Sports
- K2005 Kart racing helmets (same as SA without the need for fire retardant fittings)
- K2010 — 2010 Helmet Standard For Use in Kart Racing

PDF files of current and past Snell standards are available on the Snell Web site.

== Tests ==
To qualify for Snell certification, the helmet must pass a series of tests. The tests are determined depending on the application and the requirements of the standard.

== Safety ==
Snell Standards significantly surpass those set by the United States Department of Transportation (DOT), the American National Standards Institute (ANSI), ASTM International (ASTM) and the U.S. Consumer Product Safety Commission's 16 CFR Part 1203. Industry consensus standards such as ASTM and ANSI, and government mandatory standards such as ECE, DOT and CPSC, are all minimum standards. Snell Standards are voluntary and call for premium level of protection in headgear while satisfying the minimum requirements set for different jurisdictions. Research shows that in higher severity tests, the DOT-only helmets transmitted significantly greater shocks than Snell certified helmets.

Snell Standards are updated about every five years. These updates are based on new scientific research and improved, available manufacturing technologies. As such, and in addition to other factors such as typical use wear and tear, Snell recommends that helmets be replaced approximately every five years to ensure good safety.

For motorcycle safety Snell standards are inferior to ECE and FIM equivalents, they disregard crumple and "softness" (that is empirically observed with motorcycle crashes) for repeated hard impact on the same section of helmet. This is not what happens in an actual crash the standard actually poses a threat to safety. Helmet standards call out various tests to evaluate helmet performance in reducing preventable brain injuries and fatalities. Helmet testing in a lab is not a simulation of a real crash. The most essential part of the testing is an assessment of the helmet's total impact energy management capability. Snell Standards demand premium level of head protection above government minimum standard requirements set by DOT and ECE.

== Controversy ==
In 2005, Motorcyclist magazine wrote an in-depth article discussing helmet testing and safety. The article included criticism of Snell Memorial Foundation standards by prominent head injury and helmet design experts, including Dr. Harry Hurt, author of the Hurt Report, who described the Snell standards as "a little bit excessive," and Dr. Jim Newman, former head of Snell Memorial Foundation, who characterized the then-current Snell Memorial Foundation standard as a "marketing gimmick." The article reported that a softer absorption material would transfer less g-force to the head in the most common motorcycle accidents than the stiffer absorption material required in Snell-certified helmets. Snell Memorial Foundation released a technical critique and rebuttal to the article, available at their Web site, which asserts that there are no viable data to indicate that a softer liner or a softer shell could result in less severe head injuries. In September 2009, New York Times published a follow-up article which cited the 2005 Motorcyclist article; SMF rebutted it as well. Snell Memorial Foundation's 2010 standard for motorcycle helmets now conforms to one of the magazine's criticisms, that a larger head will also be a heavier head.

== See also ==
- E-marking of motorcycle helmets for road use

== Notes ==
- Ford, Dexter (September 2009), "Sorting Out Differences in Helmet Standards", The New York Times
