= SHARP (helmet ratings) =

British government standard for motorcycle helmets

- Safety Helmet Assessment and Rating Programme
- SHARP logo - UK motorcycle helmet rating scheme
- Status: Active
- Year started: 2007; 19 years ago
- Organization: Department for Transport (DfT)
- Base standards: British Standards BS 6658, ECE Regulation 22
- Domain: Motorcycle helmets, road safety
- License: UK Crown copyright
- Website: https://SHARP.dft.gov.uk

SHARP (the Safety Helmet Assessment and Rating Programme) is a British government quality ratings scheme for motorcycle helmets, established in 2007, with the objective of improving motorcycle safety on UK roads.

Helmets which are selected for testing by SHARP are purchased from consumer retailers. This ensures that the helmets tested by SHARP are exactly the same as what UK motorcyclists can buy. The helmets are tested, seven for each model, using 32 tests, which aim to measure the protection they offer the brain in impacts at a variety of speeds, and against both flat surfaces and kerbs. It rates the helmet models from one to five stars - with five being the highest, and states that a five star rated helmet "offers good levels of protection right around the helmet."

Nigel Mills of the University of Birmingham criticised the SHARP scheme in a paper in 2009, examining its testing of rotational acceleration, despite SHARP using the test procedures specified in British Standards BS 6658, and also the United Nations World Forum for Harmonization of Vehicle Regulations ECE Regulation 22. The UK's Transport Research Laboratory (TRL) delivered a detailed response addressing the Nigel Mills paper in November 2009. SHARP stress that irrespective of their own ratings, all helmets sold in the UK have been certified to comply with the relevant legal standard, namely ECE R22. However, it also points out that there is a 70% difference in protection between a SHARP one star rating compared to their five star rating.

SHARP has been given two prestigious road safety awards; the Prince Michael International Road Safety Award (2013, Motorcycle category) in recognition of its outstanding contribution to improving road safety, and the Fédération Internationale de Motocyclisme (FIM) annual Road Safety Award recognising achievements in helping motorcyclists.

Some retailers of motorcycle helmets – and many riders globally – use SHARP star ratings as a selection criterion.

== Certimoov ratings in France ==
Mirroring SHARP, work in France began on a similar programme in 2014. The MAIF Foundation, in partnership with the University of Strasbourg, started a project that resulted in Certimoov.

Certimoov testing recreates oblique impacts and integrates a new brain model to measure the effect of a collision on the brain. The Certimoov test results classify helmets according to the level of safety – mirroring SHARP by using star rating from 0 to 5.

Certimoov also tests bicycle helmets.
