= Motorcycle helmet =

Safety helmet used by motorcycle riders

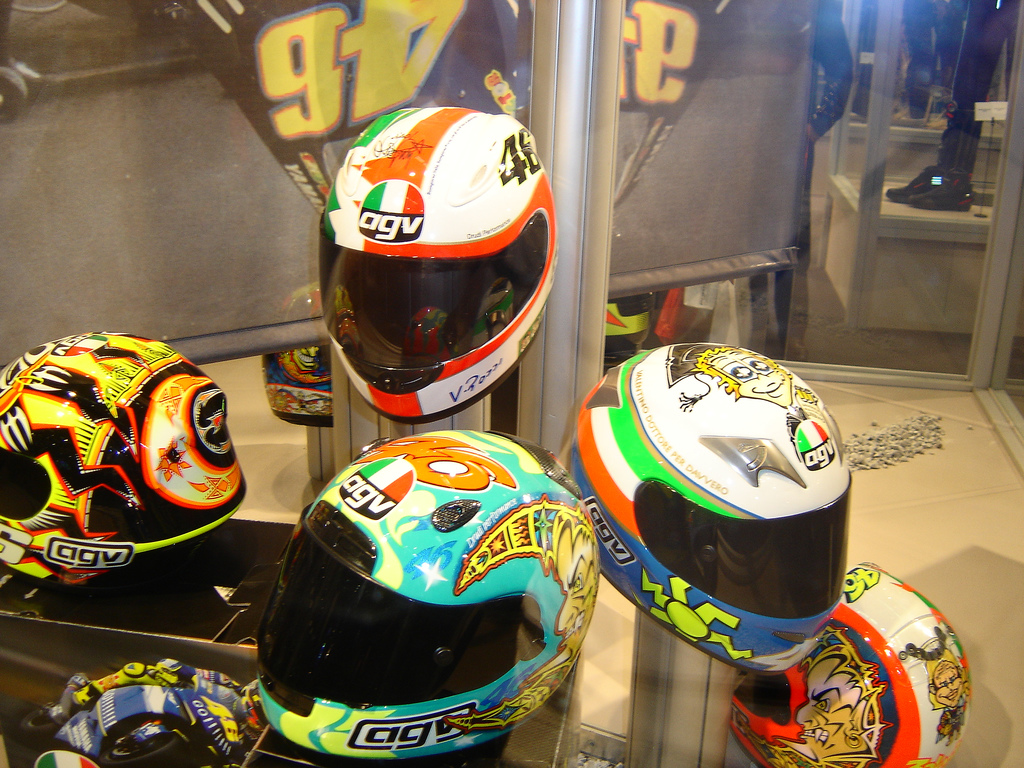
A collection of full-face motorcycle helmets worn by Moto GP racer Valentino Rossi

A motorcycle helmet is a type of helmet used by motorcycle riders. Motorcycle helmets contribute to motorcycle safety by protecting the rider's head in the event of an impact. They reduce the risk of head injury by 69% and the risk of death by 42%. Their use is required by law in many countries. However, only 10.4% of all motorcyclists wear helmets, according to the World Health Organization in 2016.

Motorcycle helmets consist of a polystyrene foam inner shell that absorbs the shock of an impact, and a protective plastic outer layer. Several variations exist, notably helmets that cover the chin area and helmets that do not. Some helmets provide additional conveniences, such as ventilation, face shields, sun visors, ear protection, or a wireless microphone.

== Origins ==
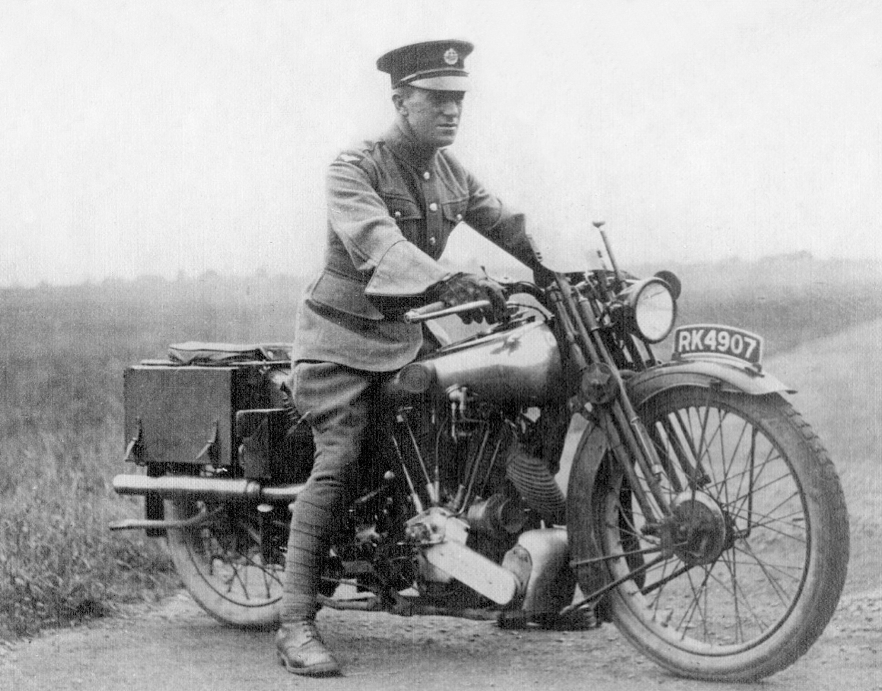
Lawrence of Arabia on a Brough Superior SS100; note his lack of helmet, which would ultimately cause his death in 1935.

The origins of the crash helmet date back to the Brooklands race track in early 1914, when a medical officer, Dr. Eric Gardner, noticed he was seeing a motor cyclist with head injuries about every two weeks. He got a Mr. Moss of Bethnal Green to make canvas and shellac helmets stiff enough to stand a heavy blow and smooth enough to glance off any projections it encountered. He presented the design to the Auto-Cycle Union where it was initially condemned, but later converted to the idea and made them compulsory for the 1914 Isle of Man TT races, although there was resistance from riders. Gardner took 94 of these helmets with him to the Isle of Man, and one rider who hit a gate with a glancing blow was saved by the helmet. Dr. Gardner received a letter later from the Isle of Man medical officer stating that after the TT they normally had "several interesting concussion cases" but that in 1914 there were none.

In May 1935, T. E. Lawrence (known as Lawrence of Arabia) had a crash on a Brough Superior SS100 on a narrow road near his cottage near Wareham. The accident occurred because a dip in the road obstructed his view of two boys on bicycles. Swerving to avoid them, Lawrence lost control and was thrown over the handlebars. He was not wearing a helmet, and suffered serious head injuries which left him in a coma; he died after six days in the hospital. One of the doctors attending him was Hugh Cairns, a neurosurgeon, who after Lawrence's death began a long study of what he saw as the unnecessary loss of life by motorcycle despatch riders through head injuries. Cairns' research led to the increased use of crash helmets by military and civilian motorcyclists and the British Army making helmets compulsory for its riders in November 1941.

In the Soviet Union, helmets for motorcyclists became mandatory in November 1967. Protective helmets for all motorcyclists and passengers became mandatory in January 1973.

== Safety effects ==
A 2008 systematic study showed that helmets reduce the risk of head injury by around 69% and the risk of death by around 42%.

Although it was once speculated that wearing a motorcycle helmet increased neck and spinal injuries in a crash, recent evidence has shown the opposite to be the case: helmets protect against cervical spine injury. A study that is often cited when advancing the argument that helmets might increase the incidence of neck and spinal injuries dates back to the mid-1980s and "used flawed statistical reasoning".

== Types ==
There are five basic types of helmets intended for motorcycling, and others not intended for motorcycling but which are used by some riders. All of these types of helmets are secured by a chin strap, and their protective benefits are greatly reduced, if not eliminated, if the chin strap is not securely fastened so as to maintain a snug fit.

From most to least protective, as generally accepted by riders and manufacturers, the helmet types are:

=== Full face helmet ===
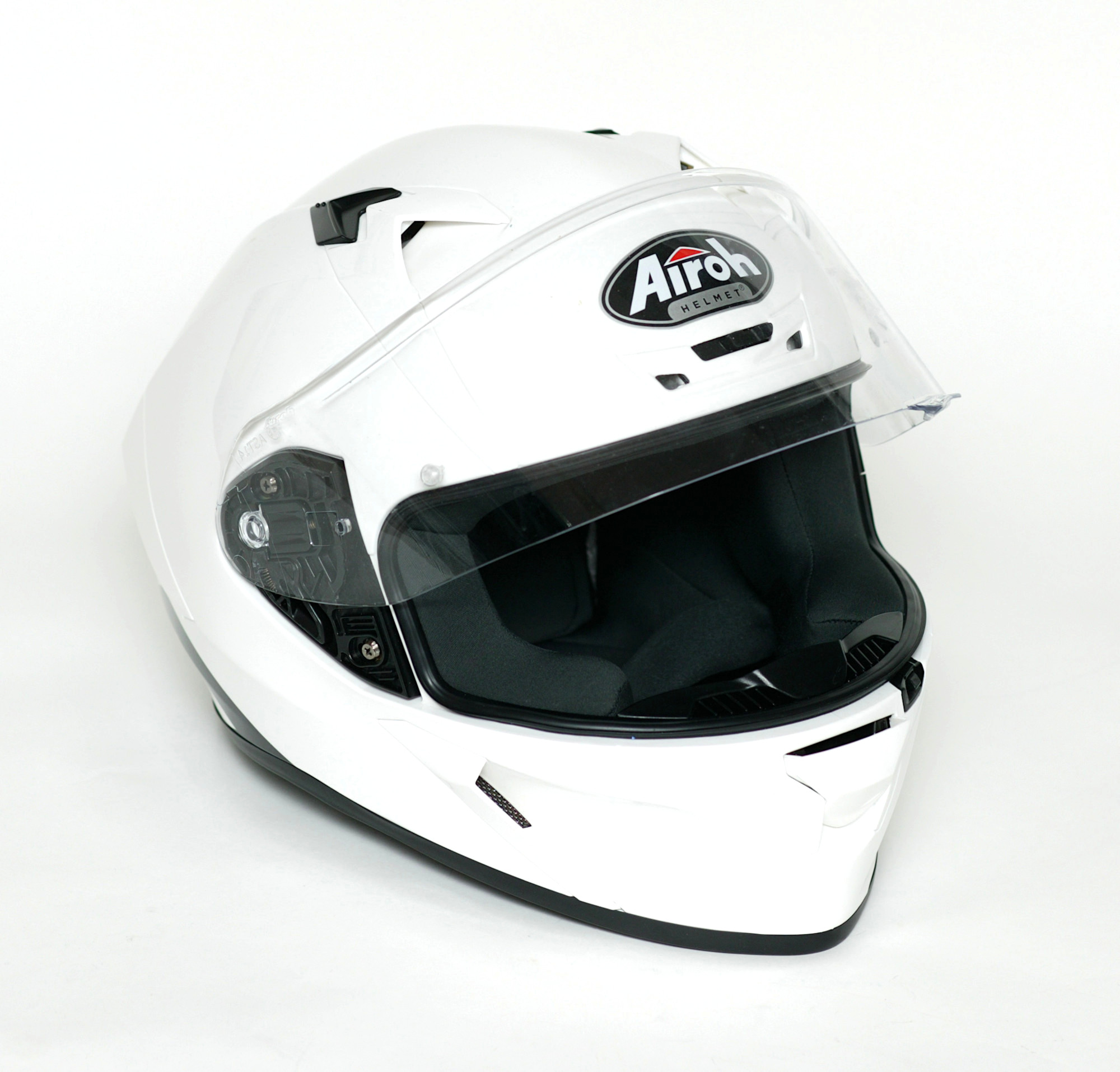
Full face helmet with its visor raised

A full face helmet covers the entire head, with a rear that covers the base of the skull, and a protective section over the front of the chin. Such helmets have an open cutout in a band across the eyes and nose, and often include a clear or tinted transparent plastic face shield, known as a visor, that generally swivels up and down to allow access to the face. Many full face helmets include vents to increase the airflow to the rider. The significant attraction of these helmets is their protectiveness. Some wearers dislike the increased heat, sense of isolation, lack of wind, and reduced hearing of such helmets. Full face helmets intended for off-road or motocross use sometimes omit the face shield, but extend the visor and chin portions to increase ventilation, since riding off-road is a very strenuous activity. Studies have shown that full face helmets offer the most protection to motorcycle riders because 35% of all crashes showed major impact on the chin-bar area. Wearing a helmet with less coverage eliminates that protection — the less coverage the helmet offers, the less protection for the rider.

=== Off-road helmet ===
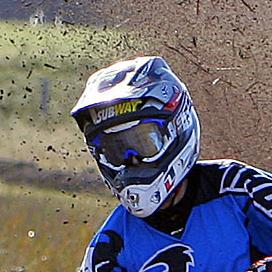
Off-road helmet showing the elongated sun visor and chin bar

An off-road helmet or motocross helmet is a full face helmet designed specifically for motocross and off-roading. It has clearly elongated chin and visor portions, a chin bar, and partially open face to give the rider extra protection while wearing goggles and to allow the unhindered flow of air during the physical exertion typical of this type of riding. The visor allows the rider to dip their head and provide further protection from flying debris during off-road riding, while also shielding the wearer's eyes from the sun.

Originally, off-road helmets did not include a chin bar, with riders using helmets very similar to modern open face street helmets, and using a face mask to fend off dirt and debris from the nose and mouth. Modern off-road helmets include a (typically angular, rather than round) chin bar to provide some facial impact protection in addition to protection from flying dirt and debris. When properly combined with goggles, the result provides most of the same protective features of full face street helmets.

=== Modular helmet ===
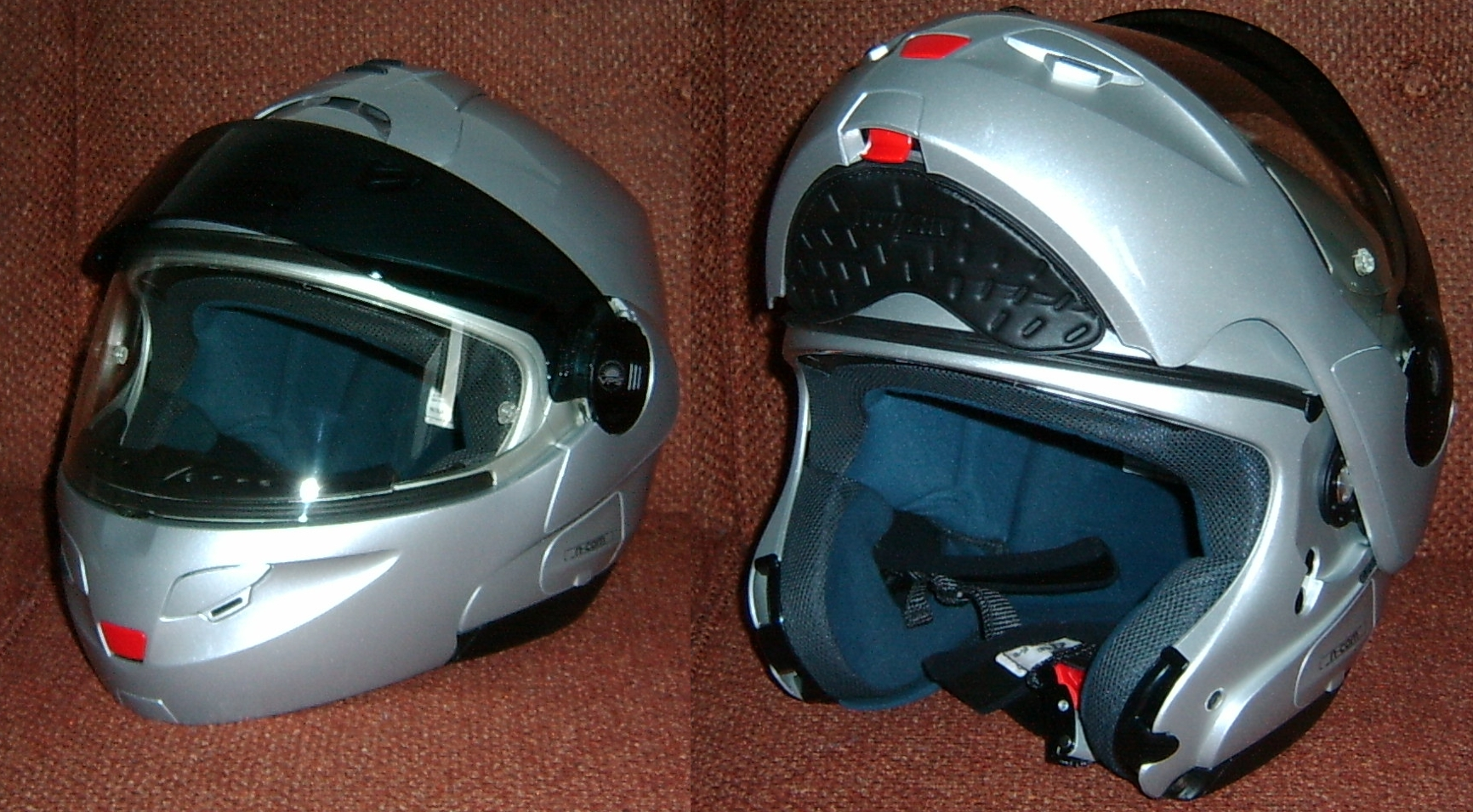
Modular helmet, closed and open

A modular helmet, also called a flip-up helmet, convertible helmet, or flip face helmet, is a hybrid between a full face and open face helmet for street use. When fully assembled and closed, they resemble full face helmets by bearing a chin bar for absorbing face impacts. Its chin bar serves as a visor that may be pivoted upwards (or, in some cases, may be removed) by a special lever to allow access to most of the face, as in an open face helmet. The rider may thus eat, drink, or have a conversation without unfastening the chinstrap and removing the helmet, making them increasingly popular among police motorcycle officers who need full head protection while riding and an unobstructed view while dismounted. It is also popular with riders who wear eyeglasses, as it allows them to fit a helmet without removing their glasses.

Many modular helmets are designed to be worn only in the closed position for riding, as the movable chin bar is designed as a convenience feature, useful while not actively riding. The curved shape of an open chin bar and face shield section can cause increased wind drag during riding, as air will not flow around an open modular helmet in the same way as a three-quarters helmet. Since the chin bar section also protrudes further from the forehead than a three-quarters visor, riding with the helmet in the open position may pose increased risk of neck injury in a crash. Some modular helmets are dual certified as full face and open face helmet. The chin bar of those helmets offer real protection and they can be used in the "open" position while riding. An example of such a helmet would be the BMW Motorrad System 6.

As of 2008, there have not been wide scientific studies of modular helmets to assess how protective the pivoting or removable chin bars are. Observation and unofficial testing suggest that significantly greater protection exists beyond that for an open face helmet, and may be enough to pass full-face helmet standardized tests, but the extent of protection is not fully established by all standards bodies.

The United States Department of Transportation (DOT) standard does not require chin bar testing. The Snell Memorial Foundation certified a flip-up helmet for the first time in 2009. ECE 22.05 allows certification of modular helmets with or without chin bar tests, distinguished by -P (protective lower face cover) and -NP (non-protective) suffixes to the certification number, and additional warning text for non-certified chin bars.

=== Open face or 3/4 helmet ===
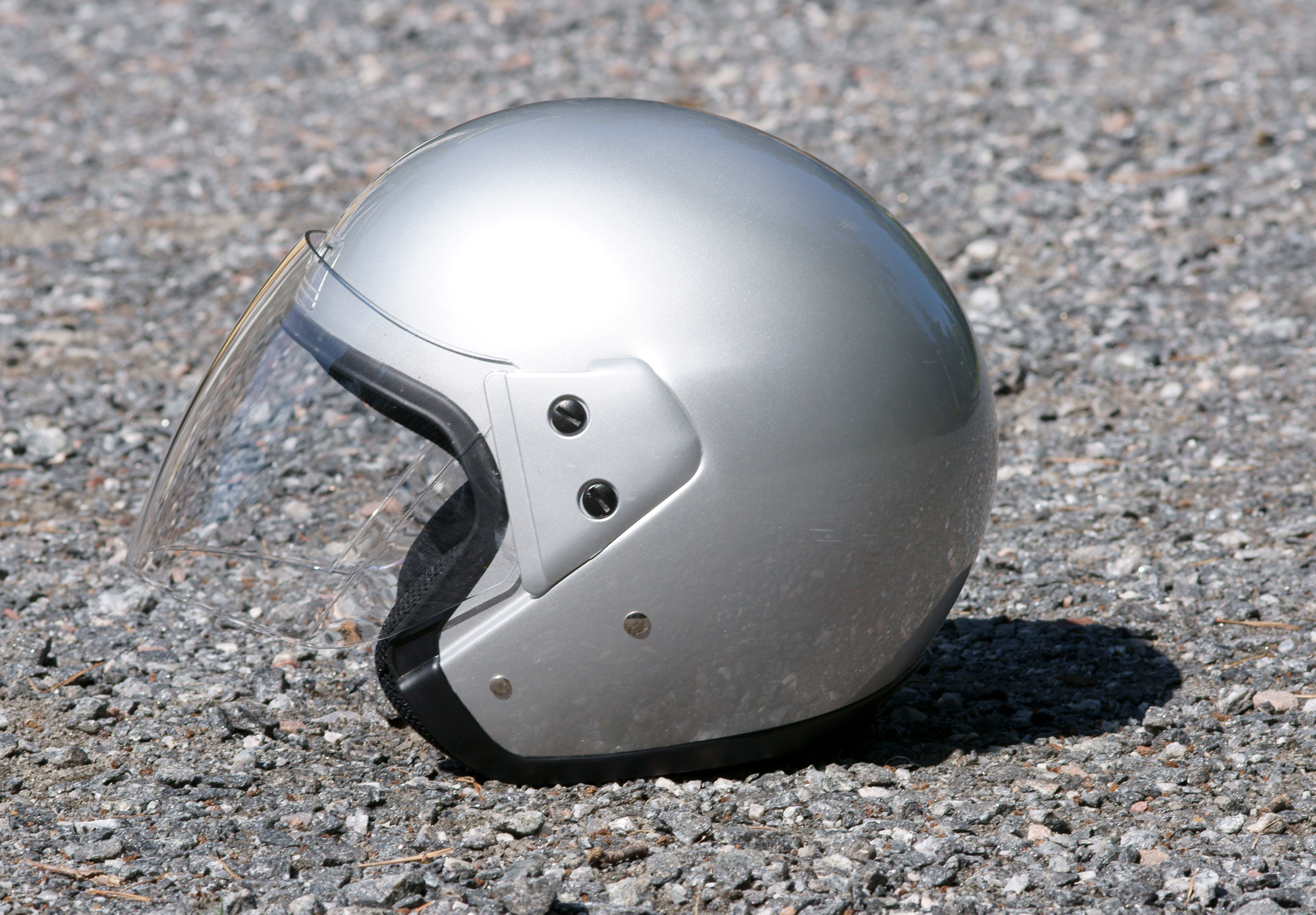
Open face helmet with attached face shield

An open face helmet or "three-quarters" helmet covers the ears, cheeks, and back of the head, but lacks the lower chin bar of the full face helmet. Many offer snap-on visors that may be used by the rider to reduce sunlight glare. An open face helmet provides the same rear protection as a full face helmet, but little protection to the face, even from non-crash events.

Bugs, dust, or even wind to the face and eyes can cause rider discomfort or injury. As a result, it is not uncommon (and in some U.S. states, is required by law) for riders to wear wrap-around sunglasses or goggles to supplement eye protection with these helmets. Alternatively, many open face helmets include, or can be fitted with, a face shield, which is more effective in stopping flying insects from entering the helmet.

=== Half helmet ===
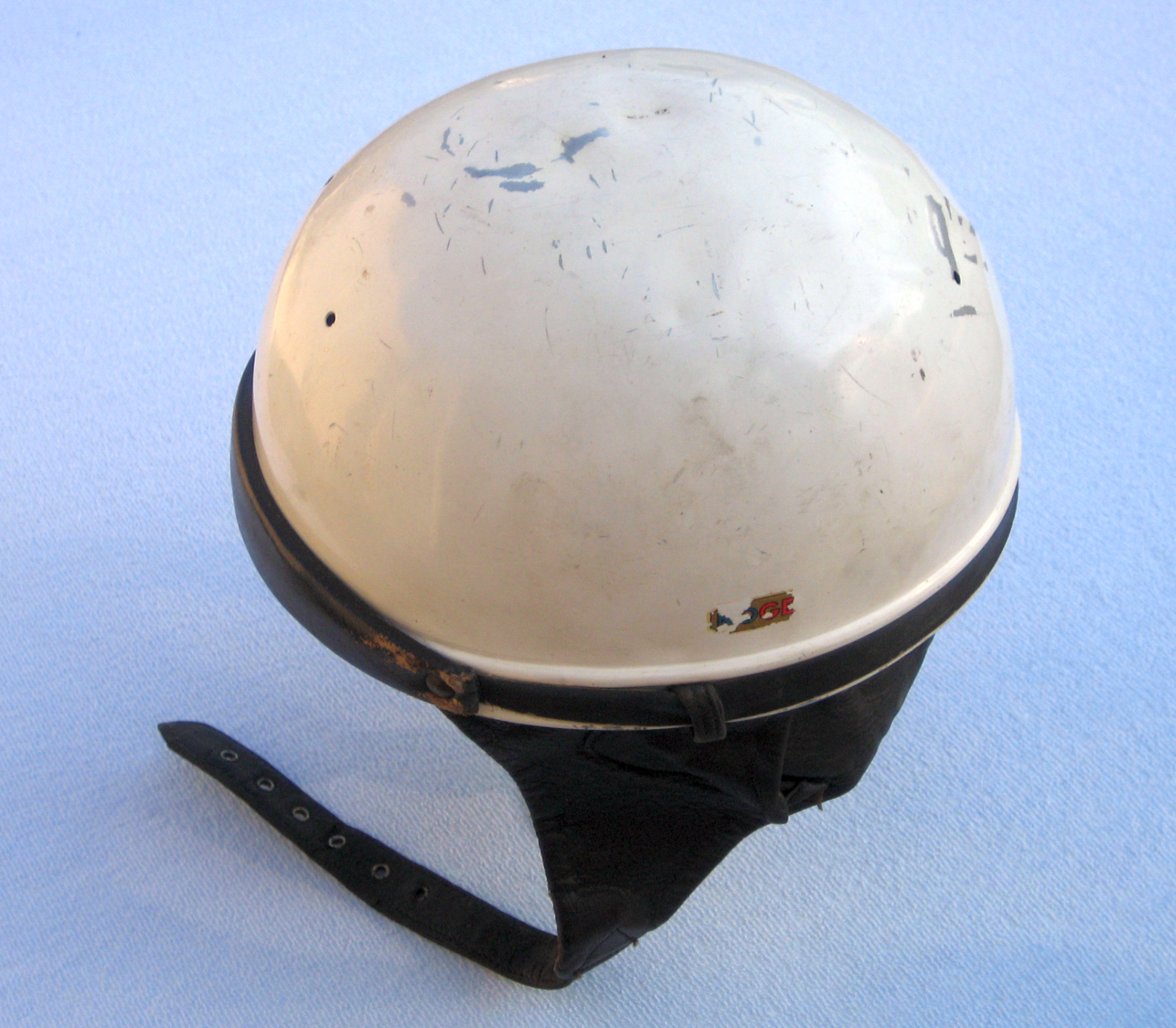
Half helmet from the 1960s

A half helmet, also called a "shorty" in the U.S. and "pudding basin" or TT helmet in the UK, is a type of open face helmet. It has essentially the same front design as a regular open face helmet but without a lowered rear (hence covering roughly half of the head), giving it a shape that roughly evokes a bowl or older combat helmet designs such as the M1 helmet. The half helmet provides the minimum coverage generally allowed by law in the U.S., and British Standards 2001:1956.

Half helmets were particularly popular in the 1960s and 1970s with rockers and road racers in the British Isles, as well as police officers in the U.S. around the same period, who often also wore them as riot helmets or as crash protection in police cars.

As with the open face, it is not uncommon to augment this helmet's eye protection through other means such as goggles. Because of their inferiority compared to other helmet styles, some Motorcycle Safety Foundations prohibit the use of half helmets.

=== Novelty helmet ===
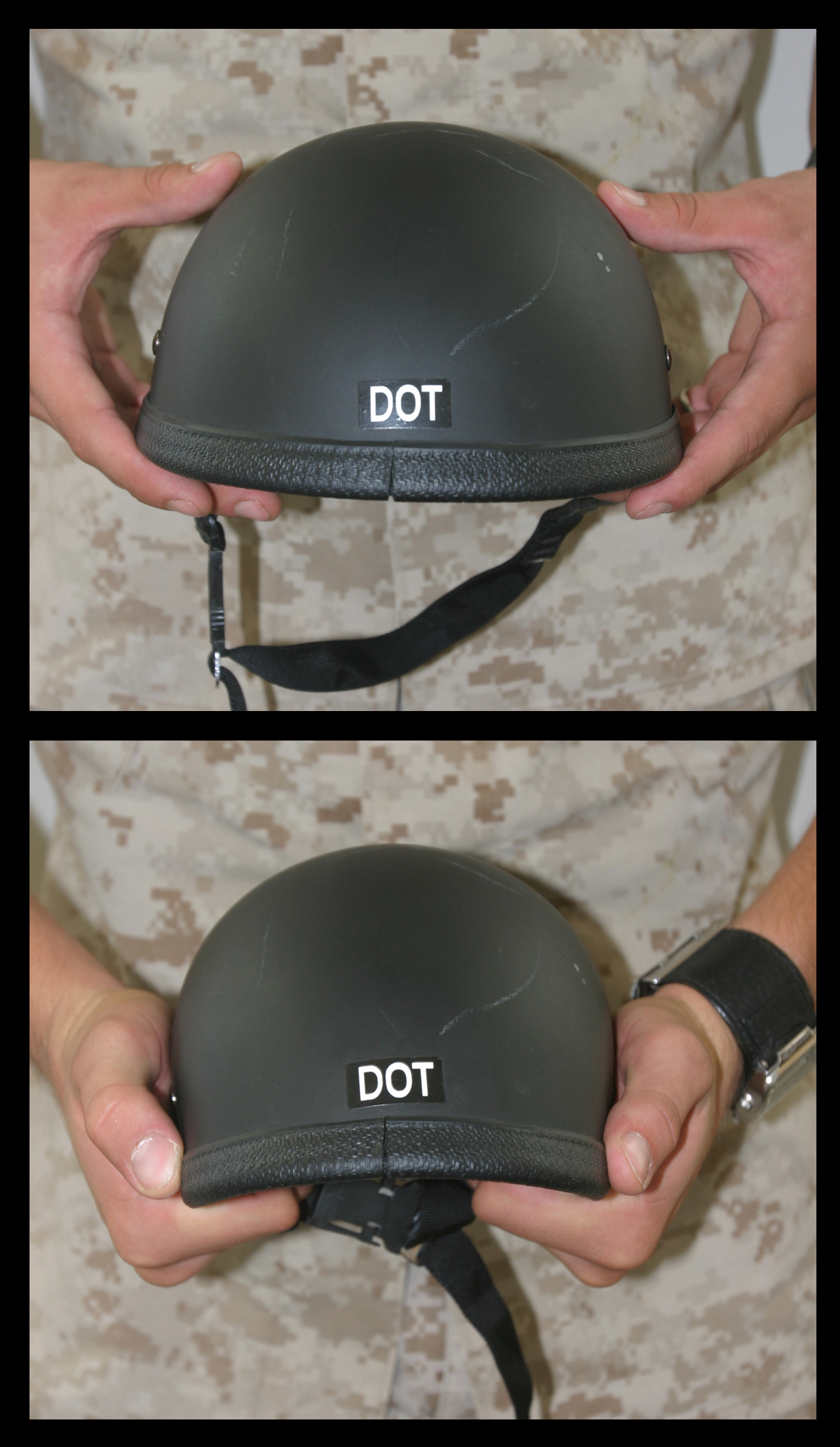
A soldier bending the shell of a confiscated non-DOT compliant novelty helmet to demonstrate its weakness

A novelty helmet, colloquially called a beanie or brain bucket, is an uncertified helmet that cannot legally be called motorcycle helmets in some jurisdictions. Such helmets are often smaller and lighter than those made to DOT standards, and are unsuitable for crash protection because they lack the energy-absorbing foam that protects the brain by allowing it to come to a gradual stop during an impact. A novelty helmet can protect the scalp against sunburn while riding and—if it stays on during a crash—might protect the scalp against abrasion, but it has no capability to protect the skull or brain from an impact. In the US, 5% of riders wore non-DOT compliant helmets in 2013, a decrease from 7% the previous year.

== Color visibility ==
Although black helmets are popular among motorcyclists, one study determined they offer the least visibility to motorists. Riders wearing a plain white helmet rather than a black one were associated with a 24% lower risk of suffering a motorcycle accident injury or death. This study also notes "Riders wearing high visibility clothing and white helmets are likely to be more safety conscious than other riders."

Conversely, another study, the MAIDS report, did not back up the claims that helmet color makes any difference in accident frequency, and that in fact motorcycles painted white were actually over-represented in the accident sample compared to the exposure data. While recognizing how much riders need to be seen, the MAIDS report documented that riders' clothing usually fails to do so, saying that "in 65.3% of all cases, the clothing made no contribution to the conspicuity of the rider or the PTW [powered two-wheeler, i.e. motorcycle]. There were very few cases found in which the bright clothing of the PTW rider enhanced the PTW's overall conspicuity (46 cases). There were more cases in which the use of dark clothing decreased the conspicuity of the rider and the PTW (120 cases)." The MAIDS report was unable to recommend specific items of clothing or colors to make riders better seen.

Subsequently, however, research by Wali et al. (2019) found that: "Helmet color is also one of the factors that can increase or decrease rider conspicuity (Wells et al., 2004; Gershonetal., 2012 ). Usually, dark colored helmets (such as black) can decrease rider conspicuity whereas light colored helmets can increase conspicuity at times when the level of rider conspicuity can influence injury outcomes (as observed above in our findings and in relevant literature (Wells et al., 2004 )). Our analysis shows that black colored helmets are associated with a significant increase in the injury severity score (an increase of 4.25 units – see Table 5), whereas light colored helmets (such as silver or grey) are found associated with a significant decrease in the injury severity score (a decrease of 7.56units). These findings are in agreement with those of Wells et al. (2004) and are important and intuitive as usually dark colored helmets (such as black) can decrease rider conspicuity (especially at night) thus increasing the risk of injury (Wells et al., 2004). Interestingly, our analysis shows that white colored helmets are also associated with a significant increase in the injury severity score, given a crash (see Table 3). This finding may seem apparently unintuitive as white colored helmets are usually believed to increase rider conspicuity and thus lower risk of injury. However, note that a white outfit (such as a white helmet) may increase conspicuity in a more complex and multi-colored urban environment, whereas, it can, in fact, decrease rider's conspicuity where a background is solely a bright sky (such as on inter-urban roads) (Gershonetal., 2012 )."

== Construction ==
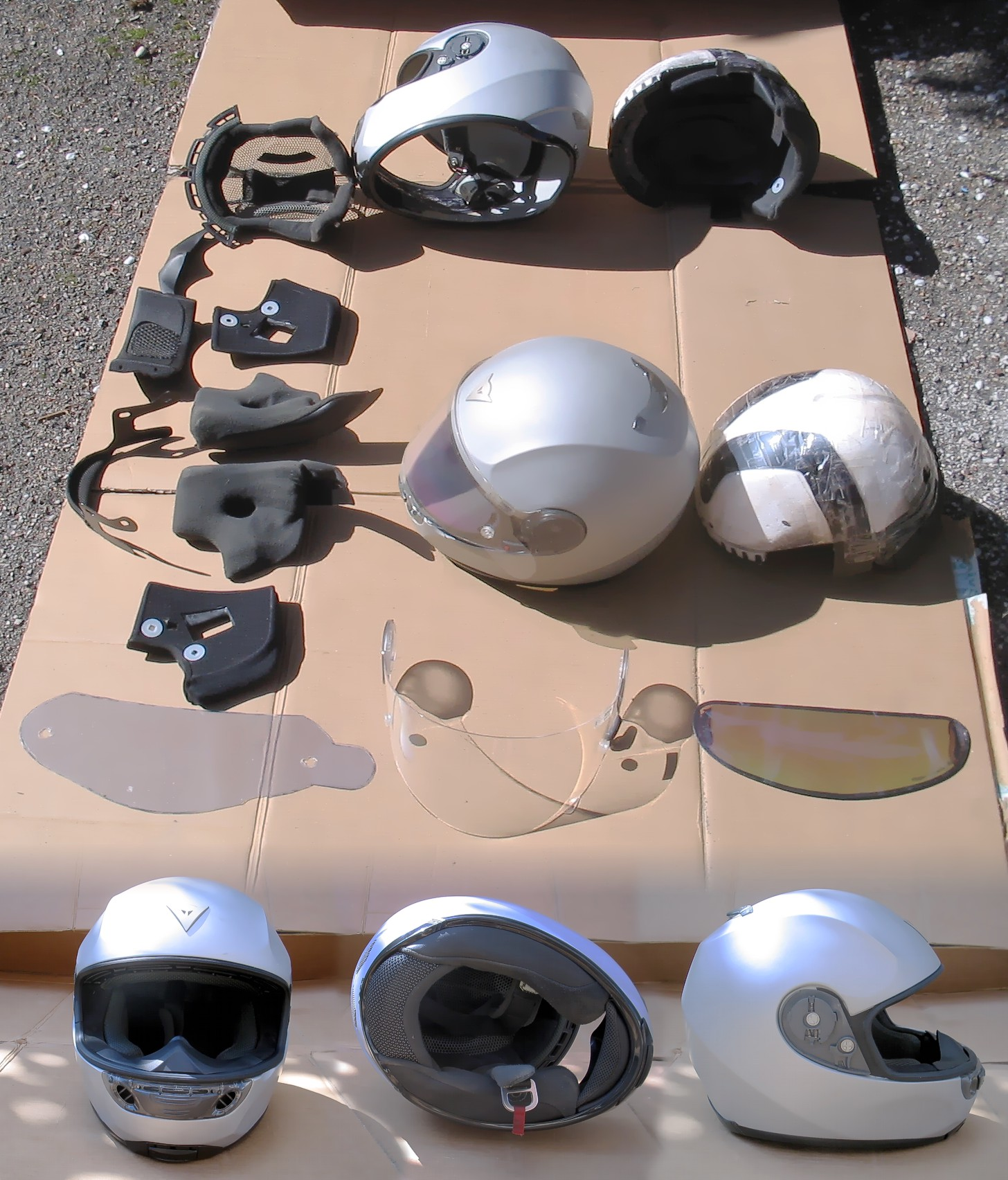
Helmet seen at different angles; At the bottom it is possible to see complete (with the exception of the visor); at the top is possible to see the different components that compose, Including the tear-off and an inner insert (colored) and anti-fog and light sensitive

Modern helmets are constructed from plastics. Premium price helmets are made with fiberglass reinforced with Kevlar or carbon fiber. They generally have fabric and foam interiors for both comfort and protection. Motorcycle helmets are generally designed to distort in a crash (thus expending the energy otherwise destined for the wearer's skull), so they provide little protection at the site of their first impact, but continued protection over the remainder of the helmet.

Helmets are made with an inner EPS (expanded polystyrene foam) shell and an outer shell to protect the EPS. The density and the thickness of the EPS is designed to cushion or crush on impact to help prevent head injuries. Some manufacturers even offer different densities to offer better protection. The outer shell can be made of plastics or fiber materials. Some of the plastics offer very good protection from penetration as in Lexan (bullet-resistant glass) but will not crush on impact, so the outer shell will look undamaged but the inner EPS will be crushed. Fiberglass is less expensive than Lexan but is heavy and very labor-intensive. Fiberglass or fiber shells will crush on impact offering better protection. Some manufacturers will use Kevlar or carbon fiber to help reduce the amount of fiberglass but in the process it will make the helmet lighter and offer more protection from penetration but still crushing on impact. However, using these materials can be very expensive, and manufacturers will balance factors such as protection, comfort, weight, and additional features to meet target price points.

== Function ==
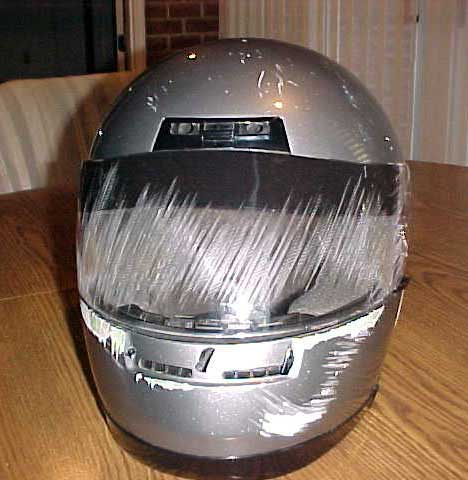
Accident damaged helmet shows how the chinbar and face shield protected the user

The conventional motorcycle helmet has two principal protective components: a thin, hard, outer shell typically made from polycarbonate plastic, fiberglass, or Kevlar and a soft, thick, inner liner usually made of expanded polystyrene or polypropylene "EPS" foam. The purpose of the hard outer shell is:

1. to prevent penetration of the helmet by a pointed object that might otherwise puncture the skull, and
2. to provide structure to the inner liner so it does not disintegrate upon abrasive contact with pavement. This is important because the foams used have very little resistance to penetration and abrasion.

The purpose of the foam liner is to crush during an impact, thereby increasing the distance and period of time over which the head stops and reducing its deceleration.

To understand the action of a helmet, it is first necessary to understand the mechanism of head injury. The common perception that a helmet's purpose is to save the rider's head from splitting open is misleading. Skull fractures are usually not life-threatening unless the fracture is depressed and impinges on the brain beneath and bone fractures usually heal over a relatively short period. Brain injuries are much more serious. They frequently result in death, permanent disability or personality change and, unlike bone, neurological tissue has very limited ability to recover after an injury. Therefore, the primary purpose of a helmet is to prevent traumatic brain injury while skull and face injuries are a significant secondary concern.

== Laws and standards ==
Motorcycle helmets greatly reduce injuries and fatalities in motorcycle accidents, thus many countries have laws requiring acceptable helmets to be worn by motorcycle riders. These laws vary considerably, often exempting mopeds and other small-displacement bikes. In some countries, most notably the United States and India, there is opposition to compulsory helmet use (see Helmet Law Defense League); not all US states have a compulsory helmet law.

Riding a motorcycle without the proper license can come with serious financial consequences. In addition to fines, the rider may be charged impound fees if their bike is confiscated. Repeat offenses often lead to even stricter penalties. The violation may also negatively impact the insurance rates and coverage.

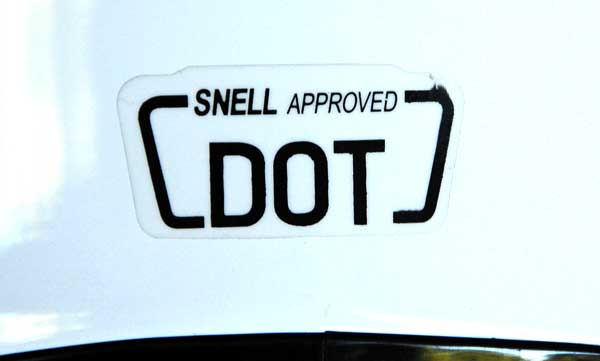
Snell-and-DOT decal on an HJC motorcycle helmet in the US.

Many countries have set standards for the effectiveness of a motorcycle helmet, including the following.

=== Europe ===
European countries apply the United Nations standard ECE 22.06, and some countries apply additional standards and testing:

- SHARP (UK)
- GOST R 41.22-2001 (ГОСТ Р 41.22-2001, based on ECE 22.05, Russia)

In the United Kingdom, many riders choose helmets bearing an Auto-Cycle Union (ACU) Gold sticker. There used to be both Gold and Silver stickers, where the Gold stickers met the BSI Type A standards and the Silver stickers met the BSI Type B. The Silver stickers are no longer in use though, as the introduction of the Economic Communities of Europe (ECE) standard provided a clearer, more stringent testing system which made the Silver standards redundant.

Helmets with an ACU Gold sticker are the only ones allowed to be worn in competition or at track days. However, Fédération Internationale de Motocyclisme (FIM) homologation is superseding the outdated ACU Gold in motorcycle racing. The requirements for FIM homologation are more up-to-date (2019) than the much older ACU Gold standard.

=== North America ===
Motorcycle helmet laws of the US by state (As of June 2022): optional (no law is in place) required for those under 18 required for those under 19 required for those under 21 required for those under 26 required regardless of age

Helmets are required in Canada and Mexico. In the US, see map: helmets are required in most states of the west and east coasts as well as the southeast, while most states in the center of the country require helmets only for new or young riders, if at all.

North American standards include:

- CMVSS (Canada)
- United States Department of Transportation (DOT) FMVSS 218
- Snell M2005 & M2010 (United States)

The Snell Memorial Foundation has developed stricter requirements and testing procedures for motorcycle helmets with racing in mind, as well as helmets for other activities (such as drag racing, bicycling, horseback riding), and many riders in North America consider Snell certification a benefit when considering buying a helmet while others note that its standards allow for more force (g's) to be transferred to a rider's head than the US Department of Transportation (DOT) standard. However, the DOT standard does not test the chin bar of helmets with them, while the Snell (and ECE) standards do for full-face type only.

=== South America ===
One South American standard is NBR 7471 (Norma Brasileira by Associação Brasileira de Normas Técnicas, Brazil).

=== Asia and Oceania ===
Standards in Asia and Oceania include:

- AS/NZS 1698, (Australia and New Zealand)
- CRASH (Consumer Rating and Assessment of Safety Helmets, Australia)
- GB 811-2010 (China)
- ICC (Import Commodity Clearance, Philippines)
- IS 4151 (Indian Standard, Bureau of Indian Standards, India)
- JIS T 8133:2000 (Japanese Industrial Standards, Japan)
- MS 1:2011 (Previously MS 1:1996. Revised standard based on ECE 22 but with added penetration test. Department of Standards Malaysia, Malaysia)
- SNI (Standar Nasional Indonesia)
- TCVN 5756:2001 (test and certify by QUATEST 3) (Vietnam)

=== Worldwide: ECE 22.05 ===
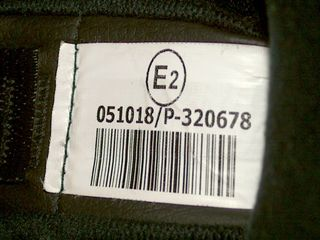
The type approval label prescribed by ECE 22.05. It indicates that the helmet was approved in France (E2) according to the most recent standard (05), with approval number 1018; and that the helmet has a protective lower face cover (P) and the production serial number 320678.

The United Nations' ECE regulation no. 22.05 contains "uniform provisions concerning the approval of protective helmets and their visors for drivers and passengers of motor cycles and mopeds". It is an addendum to the 1958 UN agreement "concerning the Adoption of Harmonized Technical United Nations Regulations for Wheeled Vehicles, Equipment and Parts". The number indicates that it is regulation no. 22, incorporating the 05 series of amendments to the standard.

As first issued in 1972, Regulation No. 22 contained requirements concerning coverage of the head, field of vision, hearing for the user, projections from the helmet, and durability of materials, as well as a series of tests regarding cold, heat and moisture treatments, shock absorption, penetration, rigidity, chinstraps and flammability. It stipulated a maximum helmet mass of 1 kg. Subsequent changes have improved the stringency of the testing procedures, among other issues.

The standard also describes how helmets must be labeled, including with such information as how to wear and clean the helmet, its size and mass, and warnings to replace the helmet after a violent impact. Helmets must also carry a type approval mark of the form "Eaa 05bbbb/c-dddd". This mark encodes the following information:

- Eaa (within a circle): The number of the country whose authorities approved the helmet (some are no longer parties to the regulation):
- E1: Germany
- E2: France
- E3: Italy
- E4: the Netherlands
- E5: Sweden
- E6: Belgium
- E7: Hungary
- E8: Czech Republic
- E9: Spain
- E10: Yugoslavia
- E11: United Kingdom
- E12: Austria
- E13: Luxembourg
- E14: Switzerland
- E16: Norway
- E17: Finland
- E18: Denmark
- E19: Romania
- E20: Poland
- E21: Portugal
- E22: Russia
- E23: Greece
- E24: Ireland
- E25: Croatia
- E26: Slovenia
- E27: Slovakia
- E28: Belarus
- E29: Estonia
- E31: Bosnia and Herzegovina
- E32: Latvia
- E34: Bulgaria
- E36: Lithuania
- E37: Turkey
- E39: Azerbaijan
- E40: Macedonia (now North Macedonia)
- E42: European Community (unused, as approvals are made by the member states)
- E43: Japan
- E45: Australia
- E46: Ukraine
- E47: South Africa
- E48: New Zealand
- 05: The series of amendments (effectively, the version number) of the standard tested (at present, normally 05)
- bbbb: The approval number issued by the approving authority
- c: The type of helmet:
  - "J" if the helmet does not have a lower face cover ("jet-style helmet")
  - "P" if the helmet has a protective lower face cover
  - "NP" if the helmet has a non-protective lower face cover
- dddd: The continuous production serial number of the individual helmet

As of December 2017, ECE 22.05 was in force in the European Union, Belarus, Bosnia and Herzegovina, Croatia, Egypt, Malaysia, Montenegro, New Zealand, Moldova, Russia, San Marino, Serbia, Switzerland, North Macedonia and Turkey. Other countries have national standards that are based on or reference ECE 22.05.

== Standards testing ==
Most motorcycle helmet standards use impacts at speeds between 4–7 m/s (9–16 mph). While motorcyclists frequently ride at speeds higher than 20 m/s (45 mph), the perpendicular impact speed of the helmet is usually not the same as the road speed of the motorcycle, and the severity of the impact is determined not only by the speed of the head but also by the surface it hits and the angle of impact.

Since the surface of the road is almost parallel to the direction a motorcyclist moves while driving, only a small component of their velocity is directed perpendicularly (though other surfaces may be perpendicular to the motorcyclist's velocity, such as trees, walls, and the sides of other vehicles). The severity of an impact is also influenced by the nature of the surface struck. The sheet metal wall of a car door may bend inwards to a depth of 7.5–10 cm (3.0–3.9 in) during a helmeted-head impact, allowing more stopping distance for the rider's head than the helmet itself. A perpendicular impact against a flat steel anvil at 5 m/s (11 mph) may be of approximate severity to an oblique impact against a concrete surface at 30 m/s (67 mph) or a perpendicular impact against a sheet metal car door or windscreen at 30 m/s.

Since there is a wide range of severity in the impacts that could happen in a motorcycle accident, some will be more severe than the impacts used in the standard tests and some will be less.

== See also ==
- Bicycle helmet
- Outline of motorcycles and motorcycling
- Racing helmet
- SHARP (helmet ratings)
- MIPS
- Motorcycle armor
- Automatic emergency call, fall or crash detection
- Motorcycle airbag
