= List of FIA member organisations =

This is a list of FIA member organisations. These are the clubs, local authorities and governing bodies that work on a more localized level to help the global Fédération Internationale de l'Automobile (FIA) organise racing events, among other pursuits.

There are hundreds of different groups all around the world. Not every country is necessarily represented, and only a select few of these are actually regarded as motorsport groups – a great number of them are motorist service organizations or touring groups, concerned more with road travel than competition.

As of June 2025, there are 245 members. The list is broken out alphabetically, by continent, and with organisation initials included where available. Each sporting body is known as a National Sporting Authority (French: Autorité Sportive Nationale; ASN).

== Africa ==
Algeria

- Mechanical Sports Federation of Algeria (FASM) – Sport and Mobility
- Touring Club of Algeria (TCA) – Mobility

Angola

- Angolan Federation of Motorsports – Sport

Botswana

- Botswana Motor Sports – Sport
- Emergency Assist 991 – Mobility

Burundi

- Automobile Club of Burundi (CAB) – Sport and Mobility

Democratic Republic of the Congo

- Automobile Federation of the Democratic Republic of Congo (FEDACO) – Sport and Mobility

Egypt

- Automobile and Touring Club of Egypt (ATCE) – Sport and Mobility

Eritrea

- National Federation Motor Racing Eritrea – Sport

Ethiopia

- Ethiopian Motor Association (EMA) – Sport and Mobility

Gabon

- Automobile Club of Gabon – Sport and Mobility

Ivory Coast

- Federation Ivoirienne Du Sport Automobile (FISA) – Sport

Kenya

- Automobile Association of Kenya (AAK) – Mobility
- Kenya Motor Sports Foundation (KMSF) – Sport

Libya

- Libyan Automobile and Touring Club (LATC) – Sport and Mobility

Madagascar

- Automobile Sport Federation of Madagascar (FSAM) – Sport

Mauritania

- Mechanical Sports Federation of Mauritania – Sport

Mauritius

- Motor Racing Club (MRC) – Sport

Morocco

- Royal Moroccan Federation of Motor Sport (FRMSA) – Sport
- Automobile Club Morocco (MCM) – Mobility

Mozambique

- Automobile and Touring Club of Mozambique (ATCM) – Sport and Mobility

Namibia

- Automobile Association of Namibia (AAN) – Mobility
- Namibia Motor Sport Federation (NMSF) – Sport

Nigeria

- Automobile and Touring Club of Nigeria – Sport and Mobility

Rwanda

- Rwanda Automobile Club (RAC) – Sport

Senegal

- Senegalaise Federation of Motor Sport and Motorcycle (FSSAM) – Sport

Seychelles

- Seychelles Karting Association (SKA) – Sport

South Africa

- Automobile Association of South Africa (AASA) – Mobility
- Motorsport South Africa (MSA) – Sport

Sudan

- Sudan Automobile and Tourism Club (SAC) – Mobility
- Sudanese Automobile and Touring Club (SATC) – Sport and Mobility

Tanzania

- Automobile Association of Tanzania (AAT) – Sport and Mobility

Tunisia

- National Automobile Club of Tunisia (NACT) – Sport and Mobility
- Touring Club of Tunisia (TCT) – Mobility

Uganda

- Automobile Association of Uganda (AA Uganda) – Mobility
- Federation of Motor Sports Clubs of Uganda (FMU) – Sport

Zambia

- Zambia Motor Sport Association (ZMSA) – Sport

Zimbabwe

- Automobile Association of Zimbabwe (AAZ) – Mobility
- Motorsport Zimbabwe – Sport

== Asia (FIA Asia) ==
Armenia

- Automobile Federation of Armenia (FAA) – Sport and Mobility

Azerbaijan

- Azerbaijan Automobile Federation (AAF) – Sport and Mobility
- Azerbaijan National Automobile Club (AMAK) – Sport

Bahrain

- Bahrain Motor Federation (BMF) – Sport and Mobility

Bangladesh

- Automobile Association of Bangladesh (AAB) – Sport and Mobility

Cambodia

- Automobile Association of Cambodia – Mobility
- Cambodia Motorsports Association – Sports

China

- China Tourism Automobile and Cruise Association (CTACA) – Mobility
- Federation of Automobile and Motorcycle Sports of China (CAMF) – Sport and Mobility

Georgia

- Georgian Automobile Sport Federation (GASF) – Sport

Hong Kong

- Hong Kong, China Automobile Association (HKAA) – Sport and Mobility

India

- Federation of Indian Automobile Associations (FIAA) – Mobility
- Federation of Motor Sports Clubs of India (FMSCI) – Sport and Mobility

Indonesia

- Indonesian Motor Association (IMI) – Sport and Mobility

Iran

- Motorcycle and Automobile Federation of the Islamic Republic of Iran (MAFIRI) – Sport
- Touring & Automobile Club of the Islamic Republic of Iran (TACI) – Mobility

Iraq

- Iraq Automobile and Touring Association – Mobility
- Iraq Club for Cars and Motorcycles – Sport

Israel

- Israel Automobile & Karting Association – Sport

Japan

- Japan Automobile Federation (JAF) – Sport and Mobility

Jordan

- Royal Automobile Club of Jordan (RACJ) – Sport and Mobility

Kazakhstan

- Automotorsport Federation of Republic of Kazakhstan – Sport
- Off Road Kazakhstan – Mobility

Kuwait

- Kuwait Automobile and Touring Club (KATC) – Mobility
- Kuwait International Automobile Club (KIAC) – Sport and Mobility

Kyrgyzstan

- Auto Motor Sport and Road Safety Federation – Sport

Lebanon

- Automobile and Touring Club of Lebanon (ATCL) – Sport and Mobility

Macau

- Automobile General Association Macao-China (AAMC) – Sport and Mobility

Malaysia

- Motorsports Association of Malaysia (MAM) – Sport

Maldives

- Racing Association of the Maldives (RAM) – Sport

Mongolia

- Mongolian Automobile Motorcycle Sports Federation (МАМСХ) – Sport

Nepal

- Nepal Automobiles' Association – Sport

Oman

- Oman Automobile Association (OAA) – Sport and Mobility

Pakistan

- Automobile Association of Pakistan (AAP) – Mobility
- Motorsport Association of Pakistan (MAP) – Sport

Palestine

- Palestinian Motor Sport and Motorcycle Federation – Sport and Mobility

Philippines

- Automobile Association Philippines (AAP) – Sport and Mobility

Qatar

- Qatar Automobile and Touring Club (QATC) – Mobility
- Qatar Motor and Motorcycle Federation (QMMF) – Sport

Saudi Arabia

- Saudi Automobile Federation (SAF) – Mobility
- Saudi Automobile and Motorcycle Federation (SAMF) – Sport
- Saudi Automobile and Touring Association (SATA) – Mobility

Singapore

- Automobile Association of Singapore (AAS) – Mobility
- Motor Sports Singapore (MSS) – Sport and Mobility

South Korea

- Korea Automobile Association (KAA) – Mobility
- Korea Automobile Racing Association (KARA) – Sport

Sri Lanka

- Automobile Association of Ceylon (AAC) – Mobility
- Ceylon Motor Sports Club (CMSC) – Sport

Syria

- Automobile and Touring Club of Syria (ATCS) – Mobility
- Syrian Automobile Club (SAC) – Sport and Mobility

Chinese Taipei (Taiwan)

- Chinese Taipei Automobile Association (CTAA) – Mobility
- Chinese Taipei Motor Sports Association (CTMSA) – Sport

Thailand

- Royal Automobile Association of Thailand (RAAT) – Sport and Mobility

Turkmenistan

- National Center of Automobile Sports of Turkmenistan – Sport

United Arab Emirates

- Emirates Motorsports Organization (EMSO) – Sport and Mobility

Uzbekistan

- National Autosport & Karting Federation of Uzbekistan (NAFKU) – Sport

Vietnam

- Automobile Association of Vietnam (AA Vietnam) – Mobility
- Vietnamese Motorsports Association (VMA) – Sport

Yemen

- Yemen Club for Touring and Automobile (YCTA) – Sport and Mobility

== Europe ==
Albania

- Automobile Club Albania (ACA) – Sport and Mobility

Andorra

- Automobile Club of Andorra (ACA) – Sport and Mobility

Austria

- Austrian Automobile Motorcycle and Touring Club (ÖAMTC) – Sport and Mobility
- Austrian Camping Club (ÖCC) – Mobility

Belarus

- Belarusian Auto Moto Touring Club (BKA) – Mobility
- Automobile Federation of Belarus (FAB) – Sport and Mobility

Belgium

- Royal Automobile Club of Belgium (RACB) – Sport and Mobility
- Touring Club Belgium (TCB) – Mobility

Bosnia and Herzegovina

- Bosnia and Herzegovina Automobile Club (BIHAMK) – Mobility

Bulgaria

- Bulgarian Automobile Union (UAB) – Sport and Mobility

Croatia

- Croatian Automobile & Karting Federation (CAKF) – Sport
- Croatian Auto Club (HAK) – Mobility

Cyprus

- Cyprus Automobile Association (CAA) – Sport and Mobility

Czech Republic

- Autoclub of the Czech Republic (ACCR) – Sport and Mobility
- Ustredni Automotoklub CR (UAMK CR) – Mobility

Denmark

- Danish Automobile Sports Union (DASU) – Sport
- Federation of Danish Motorists (FDM) – Mobility

Estonia

- Automobile Club of Estonia (EAK) – Mobility
- Estonian Autosport Union (EAU) – Sport and Mobility

Finland

- AKK Motorsport (AKK) – Sport
- Automobile and Touring Club of Finland (AL) – Mobility
- SF-Caravan (SFC) – Mobility

France

- Automobile Club of France (ACF) – Mobility
- Automobile Club Association – Mobility
- Fédération Française du Sport Automobile (FFSA) – Sport
- French Federation of Camping and Caravanning (FFCC) – Mobility

Germany

- Allgemeiner Deutscher Automobil-Club (ADAC) – Mobility
- Automobilclub von Deutschland (AVD) – Mobility
- Deutscher Motor Sport Bund (DMSB) – Sport

Greece

- Hellenic Automobile & Touring Services Club (ΗΑΤSE) - Mobility
- Hellenic Motorsport Federation (OMAE) – Sport

Hungary

- Hungarian Auto Club (MAK) – Mobility
- National Automobile Sport Federation of Hungary (MNASZ) – Sport

Iceland

- Icelandic Automobile Association (FIB) – Mobility
- Icelandic Motorsport Association (AKIS) – Sport

Ireland

- Royal Irish Automobile Club (RIAC) – Sport

Italy

- Automobile Club d'Italia (ACI) – Sport and Mobility

Kosovo

- Auto Moto Club Kosova (AMCK) – Mobility
- Federation of Auto Sport of Kosovo (FASK) – Sport
- Kosova Touring Assistance (NTK) – Mobility

Latvia

- Auto-Moto Society of Latvia (LAMB) – Mobility
- Latvian Federation of Motor Vehicles (LAF) – Sport

Liechtenstein

- Automobile Club of the Principality of Liechtenstein (ACFL) – Sport and Mobility

Lithuania

- Association of Lithuanian Automobilists (LAS) – Mobility
- Lithuanian Automobile Club (LAC) – Mobility
- Lithuanian Automobile Sport Federation (LASF) – Sport

Luxembourg

- Automobile Club of Luxembourg (ACL) – Sport and Mobility

North Macedonia

- Automobile Federation of North Macedonia – Sport
- Auto-Moto Association of Macedonia (AMSM) – Mobility

Malta

- Malta Motorsport Federation (MMF) – Sport
- Touring Club Malta (TCM) – Mobility

Moldova

- Automobile Club of Moldova (ACM) – Mobility
- Automobile Federation of Moldova (FDRM) – Sport

Monaco

- Automobile Club de Monaco (ACM) – Sport and Mobility

Montenegro

- Auto-Moto Association of Montenegro (AMSCG) – Sport and Mobility

Netherlands

- KNAC National Autosport Federation (KNAF) – Sport
- Royal Dutch Automobile Club (KNAC) – Mobility
- Royal Dutch Touring Club (ANWB) – Mobility

Norway

- Norwegian Automobile Federation (NAF) – Mobility
- Royal Norwegian Automobile Club (KNA) – Sport and Mobility

Poland

- Polish Automobile and Motorcycle Association (PZM) – Sport and Mobility

Portugal

- Automobile Club of Portugal (ACP) – Mobility
- Portuguese Federation of Auto Racing and Karting (FPAK) – Sport

Romania

- Automobile Club of Romania (ACR) – Sport and Mobility

Russia

- Autoclub Assistance-Rus (ACAR) – Mobility
- Russian Automobile Federation (RAF) – Sport and Mobility
- Russian Automobile Society (RAS) – Mobility

San Marino

- Auto Motoring Federation of San Marino (FAMS) – Sport

Serbia

- Auto-Moto Association of Serbia (AMSS) – Sport and Mobility

Slovakia

- Autoklub Slovakia Assistance (ASA) – Mobility
- Slovak Association of Motor Sport (SAMS) – Sport

Slovenia

- Auto-Moto Association of Slovenia (AMZS) – Mobility
- Auto Sport Federation of Slovenia – Sport

Spain

- Royal Automobile Club of Spain (RACE) – Mobility
- Royal Spanish Automobile Federation (RFEDA) – Sport
- Royal Automobile Club of Catalonia (RACC) – Mobility

Sweden

- Royal Automobile Club (KAK) – Mobility
- Riksförbundet M Sverige – Mobility
- Swedish Automobile Sports Federation (SBF) – Sport
- Swedish Motorcyclist (SMC) – Mobility

Switzerland

- Automobile Club de Suisse (ACS) – Mobility
- Auto Sport Suisse – Sport
- Touring Club Suisse (TCS) – Mobility

Turkey

- Turkish Automobile Sports Federation (TOSFED) – Sport
- Touring and Automobile Club of Turkey (TTOK) – Mobility

Ukraine

- Automobile Federation of Ukraine (FAU) – Sport and Mobility

United Kingdom

- Automobile Association (AA) – Mobility
- Caravan and Motorhome Club – Mobility
- IAM RoadSmart – Mobility
- Motorsport UK (MUK) – Sport
- Royal Automobile Club (RAC) – Mobility

Vatican City

- Pontifical Council for the Pastoral Care of Migrants and Itinerants – Mobility

== North America ==
Antigua and Barbuda

- Antigua Pro Racing Limited – Sport

Belize

- Belize Automobile and Touring Association (BATA) – Mobility
- Belize Automobile Club (BAC) – Sport

Bahamas

- Bahamas Motor Sports Association – Sport

Barbados

- Barbados Motoring Federation (BMF) – Sport and Mobility

Canada

- Groupe de Développement Sportif (GDS) – Sport
- Canadian Automobile Association (CAA) – Mobility

Cayman Islands

- Cayman Motoring Federation (CMF) – Sport

Costa Rica

- Automobile Club of Costa Rica (ACCR) – Sport and Mobility

Cuba

- Karting and Automobile Federation of Cuba (FAKC) – Sport

Dominican Republic

- Dominican Automobile Club – Mobility
- Dominican Motor Racing Federation (FDA) – Sport

El Salvador

- Automobile Club of El Salvador (ACES) – Sport and Mobility

Guatemala

- Automobile Club of Guatemala – Sport

Haiti

- Auto Sport Haiti – Sport and Mobility

Honduras

- Honduran Association of Motor Sport (AHAD) – Sport

Jamaica

- Jamaica Automobile Association (JAA) – Mobility
- Jamaica Millennium Motoring Club (JMMC) – Sport and Mobility

Mexico

- Mexican Association Automotives (AMA) – Mobility
- National Automobile Association (ANA) – Mobility
- Mexican International Motor Sport Federation (OMDAI) – Sport

Nicaragua

- Automotive Club of Nicaragua (CAN) – Sport

Panama

- Automotive Association of Touring and Sports of Panama (ASAI) – Sport and Mobility

Puerto Rico

- Racing Federation of Puerto Rico (FAPR) – Sport and Mobility

Trinidad and Tobago

- Trinidad and Tobago Automobile Association (TAA) – Mobility
- Trinidad and Tobago Automobile Sports Association (TTASA) – Sports

United States

- American Automobile Touring Alliance (AATA) – Mobility
- Automobile Competition Committee for the United States (ACCUS) – Sport

== Oceania ==
Australia

- Australian Automobile Association (AAA) – Mobility
- Motorsport Australia (MA) – Sport

New Zealand

- MotorSport New Zealand (MSNZ) – Sport
- New Zealand Automobile Association (NZAA) – Mobility

== South America ==
Argentina

- Automovil Club Argentino (ACA) – Sport and Mobility

Bolivia

- Bolivian Automobile Club (ACB) – Sport and Mobility

Brazil

- Automotive Association of Brazil (AAB) – Mobility
- Brazilian Automobile Club – Mobility
- Brazilian Automobile Confederation (CBA) – Sport

Chile

- Automobile Club of Chile – Mobility
- Chilean Federation of Motor Sport (FADECH) – Sport

Colombia

- Touring and Automobile Club of Colombia (ACC) – Sport and Mobility

Ecuador

- Automobile Club of Ecuador (ANETA) – Sport and Mobility

Guyana

- Guyana Motor Racing and Sports Club – Sport

Paraguay

- Touring and Automobile Club of Paraguay (TACPY) – Sport and Mobility

Peru

- Touring and Automobile Club of Peru (TACP) – Sport and Mobility

Uruguay

- Automobile Club of Uruguay (ACU) – Sport and Mobility

Venezuela

- Touring and Automobile Club of Venezuela (TACV) – Sport and Mobility

== Associate members ==
- International Association of Permanent Circuits
- EuroRAP
- International Federation of Motorhome Clubs
- Fédération Internationale des Véhicules Anciens (FIVA)
- International Road Assessment Programme
