= Alliance Internationale de Tourisme =

The AIT logo

Alliance Internationale de Tourisme (AIT) is an international federation of motoring organisations created to "represent the interests of national automobile associations and touring clubs". It was founded at the Casino Bourgeois in Luxembourg City on 4 August 1898 as the Ligue Internationale des Associations Touristes (LIAT) but changed its name to the Alliance Internationale de Tourisme (AIT) on 30 May 1919.

Membership of the Alliance is limited to organisations active in the field of tourism, mobility, motoring and/or open air activities, and not open to individuals. According to the AIT website, the organisation claims 140 members in 101 countries.

== Members ==
This is a complete list of members as of August 2012:

- Touring Club d'Algérie (TCA)
- Automobil Club d'Andorra (ACA)
- Argentine Automobile Club (ACA)
- Touring Club Argentino (TCA)
- ARVIKON Automobile & Tourist Club (ARVIKON)
- Automobile Federation of Armenia (FAA)
- Australian Automobile Association (AAA)
- Österreichischer Automobil Motorrad und Touring Club (ÖAMTC)
- Österreichischer Camping Club (ÖCC)
- Autotur Tourism Company (ATC)
- National Automobile Club of Azerbaijan (NACA)
- Automobile Association of Bangladesh (AAB)
- Belarusian Auto Moto Touring Club (BKA)
- SMOK International Travel Agency (SMOK)
- Touring Club Belgium (TCB)
- Royale Ligue Velocipedique Belge (RLVB)
- Fédération Belge du Cyclotourisme (FBC_BBR)
- Automovil Club Boliviano (ACB)
- Bosnia and Hercegovina Automobile Club (BIHAMK)
- Union des Automobilistes Bulgares (UAB)
- Canadian Automobile Association (CAA)
- Automovil Club de Chile (ACCHI)
- China Tourism Automobile and Cruise Association (CTACA)
- Touring and Automobile Club of Colombia (ACC)
- Automovil Club de Costa Rica (ACCR)
- Hrvatski Autoklub (HAK)
- Cyprus Automobile Association (CAA)
- Ustredni Automotoklub CR (UAMK CR)
- Forenede Danske Motorejere (FDM)
- Dansk Cyklist Forbund (DCF)
- Automovil Club del Ecuador (ANETA)
- Automobile & Touring Club of Egypt (ATCE)
- Ministry of Tourism of the Arab Republic of Egypt
- Automobile Club of Estonia (EAK)
- Automobile and Touring Club of Finland (AL)
- SF Caravan (SFC)
- Fédération Française des Automobile Clubs (FFAC)
- Camping Club de France (CCDF)
- Fédération Française de Cyclotourisme (FFCT)
- Union des Groupes du Touring Club de France (UGTCF)
- Georgian Automobile Federation (GAF)
- Allgemeiner Deutscher Automobil Club (ADAC)
- Automobilclub von Deutschland (AvD)
- Deutscher Camping Club (DCC)
- Deutscher Segler Verband (DSV)
- The Automobile Association (AA)
- Royal Scottish Automobile Club (RSAC)
- Royal Automobile Club
- Camping and Caravanning Club (CCC)
- Caravan Club
- Automobile and Touring Club of Greece (ELPA)
- Yacht Club of Greece (YCG)
- Pontifical Council for the Pastoral Care of Migrants and Itinerant People
- Hong Kong Automobile Association (HKAA)
- Magyar Autoklub (MAK)
- Felag Islenzkra Bifreidaeigenda (FIB)
- Federation of indian Automobile Associations (FIAA)
- Ikatan Motor Indonesia (IMI)
- Touring & Automobile Club of the Islamic Republic of Iran (TACI)
- Iraq Automobile and Touring Association (IATA)
- Automobile Association (Ireland) (AA Ireland)
- Automobile and Touring Club of Israel (MEMSI)
- Automobile Club d'Italia (ACI)
- Touring Club Italiano (TCI)
- Federazione del Campeggio e del Caravanning (Federcampeggio)
- Jamaica Automobile Association (JAA)
- Japan Automobile Federation (JAF)
- Royal Automobile Club of Jordan (RACJ)
- Drivers Association of the republic of Kazakhstan (CB TC PK)
- Automobile Association of Kenya (AAK)
- Korea Automobile Association (KAA)
- Kuwait Automobile & Touring Club (KATC)
- Eastern Automobile Club (EAC)
- Auto moto Society of Latvia (LAMB)
- Automobile et Touring Club du Liban (ATCL)
- Automobile and Touring Club of Libya (ATCL)
- Association of Lithuanian Automobilists (LAS)
- Automobile Club du Grand Duché de Luxembourg (ACL)
- Auto Moto Sojuz na Makedonija (AMSM)
- Automobile Association of Malaysia (AAM)
- Touring Club Malta (TC(M))
- Alianza Mexicana Automovilistica (AMA)
- Automobil Club din Moldova (ACM)
- Touring Club du Maroc (TCM)
- Automobile Association of Namibia (AAN)
- Automobile Association of Nepal (AAN)
- Koninklijke Nederlandse Toeristenbond ANWB (ANWB)
- Koninklijke Nederlandsche Autombiel Club (KNAC)
- Nederlandse Toer Fiets Unie (NTFU)
- New Zealand Automobile Association (NZAA)
- Norges Automobil-Forbund (NAF)
- Oman Automobile Association (OAA)
- Automobile Association of Pakistan (AAP)
- Touring y Automovil Club Paraguayo (TACPY)
- Touring y Automóvil Club del Perú (TACP)
- Automobile Association Philippines (AAP)
- Polski Zwiazek Motorowy (PZM)
- Polskie Towarzystwo Turystyczno-Krajoznawcze (PTTK)
- Automovel Club de Portugal (ACP)
- Federaçao Portuguesa de Cicloturismo e Utilizadores de Bicicleta (FPCUB)
- Qatar Automobile and Touring Club (QATC)
- Automobil Clubul Roman (ACR)
- Russian Automobile Society (RUS)
- Saudi Automobile and Touring Association (SATA)
- Saudi Automobile Federation (SAF)
- Touring Club du Senegal (TCSn)
- Auto-moto savez Srbije i Crne Gore (AMS SCG)
- Automobile Association of Singapore (AAS)
- Slovenski Autoturist Klub (SATC)
- Narodny Automotoklub Slovenskej Republiky (NAMK SR)
- Auto moto Zveza Slovenije (AMZS)
- Automobile Association of South Africa (AASA)
- Royal Automobile Club of Spain (RACE)
- Royal Automobile Club of Catalonia (RACC)
- Automobile Association of Ceylon (AAC)
- Motormännens riksförbund (M)
- Svenska Turistforeningen (STF)
- Cykelframjandet
- Sveriges Motorcyklisters Centralorganisation (SMC)
- Touring Club Suisse (TCS)
- Cruising Club der Schweiz (CCS)
- Zelt Klub Zurich (ZKZ)
- Suisse Tourisme (ST)
- Automobile et Touring Club de Syrie (ATCS)
- Automobile Association of Tanzania (AAT)
- Royal Automobile Association of Thailand
- Trinidad & Tobago Automobile Association (TAA)
- Touring Club de Tunisie (TCT)
- Turkiye Turing ve Otomobil Kurumu (TTOK)
- Ministère du Tourisme
- Automobile Association of Uganda (AA Uganda)
- Company 112 Ukraine (112 UA)
- Fédération Automobile d'Ukraine (FAU)
- Automobile and Touring Club for United Arab Emirates (ATC UAE)
- American Automobile Association (AAA)
- American Automobile Touring Alliance (AATA)
- Automovil Club del Uruguay (ACU)
- Touring y Automovil Club de Venezuela (TACV)
- Yemen Club for Touring & Automobile (YCTA)
- Automobile Association of Zimbabwe (AAZ)
