= Automobile association =

Club for automobile drivers

An automobile association, also referred to as a motoring club, motoring association, or motor club, is an organization, either for-profit or non-profit, which motorists (drivers and vehicle owners) can join to enjoy benefits provided by the club relating to driving a vehicle. There is most often an annual membership fee to join. A membership identification card, valid for the time period of membership paid, is typically issued to the member.

== Typical motor club benefits ==
Member benefits may include the following:

- Use of the membership card as a bail bond card for minor traffic violations. In the USA this is especially useful for members driving outside their own state, since other state law enforcement agencies commonly do not recognize posting out-of-state driver's licenses as bail bond, but often will accept motor club member cards.
- Emergency road service upon presentation of the membership card. Often there is a nationwide network with agreements with various local towing and other emergency road service providers.
- Provision of maps, or other tourist or motoring information in some cases, to members.
- In some cases, reward stickers or decals may be provided to the member to place in the window of his/her vehicle, offering a reward to someone who locates or reports the vehicle if stolen.
- Sometimes certain services related to vehicles, such as transferring ownership, may be provided to members at a reduced cost.
- Some businesses, such as motels, may provide members of certain motor clubs with discounts upon presentation of their membership cards.

== Motor clubs ==
=== Africa ===
- Automobile Association of Kenya
- Automobile Association of South Africa

=== Asia ===
==== Bangladesh ====
- Automobile Association of Bangladesh

==== Japan ====
- Japan Automobile Federation

=== Australia and New Zealand ===
- Australian Automobile Associations
  - Automobile Association of the Northern Territory (AANT) – Northern Territory
  - NRMA (trading name of National Roads and Motorists Association) – New South Wales and Australian Capital Territory
  - Royal Automobile Association (RAA) – South Australia
  - Royal Automobile Club of Tasmania (RACT) – Tasmania
  - Royal Automobile Club of Queensland (RACQ) – Queensland
  - Royal Automobile Club of Victoria (RACV) – Victoria
  - Royal Automobile Club of Western Australia (RAC WA) – Western Australia
- New Zealand Automobile Association (NZAA)

=== Europe ===
==== Armenia ====
- FAA

==== Austria ====
- ÖAMTC
- ARBÖ

==== Bosnia and Herzegovina ====
- BIHAMK

==== Croatia ====
- HAK

==== Germany ====
- ADAC (Allgemeiner Deutscher Automobilclub)
- AvD (Automobilclub von Deutschland)

==== Netherlands ====
- ANWB

==== UK ====
- Civil Service Motoring Association
- RAC
- The Automobile Association

=== Americas ===
- American Automobile Association
- Argentine Automobile Club
- Better World Club
- Canadian Automobile Association
- Good Sam RV Emergency Road Service
- Shell Motorist Club

== See also ==
- Car club
- Automobile industry
- Vehicle insurance
- Effects of the automobile on societies
- Fédération Internationale de l'Automobile
