= Australasian New Car Assessment Program =

Australian car safety performance assessment

- Formation: 1993
- Services: Automotive safety assessment
- Members: 21 organisations (2026)

The Australasian New Car Assessment Program (ANCAP) is a car safety performance assessment programme based in Australia and founded in 1993. ANCAP specialises in the crash testing of automobiles sold in Australia and the publishing of these results for the benefit of consumers. ANCAP provides consumers with transparent advice and information on the level of occupant and pedestrian protection provided by different vehicle models in the most common types of crashes, as well as their ability—through technology—to avoid a crash.

Since 1993, ANCAP has published crash test results (as of 2015) for over 515 passenger and light commercial vehicles sold in Australia and New Zealand. Vehicles are awarded an ANCAP safety rating of between one and five stars indicating the level of safety they provide in the event of a crash. The more stars, the better the vehicle performed in ANCAP tests. To achieve the maximum five-star ANCAP safety rating, a vehicle must achieve the highest standards in all tests and feature advanced safety assist technologies.

In 2018, ANCAP adopted the Euro NCAP protocols, with the scoring tweaked to the local conditions.

In 2021 ANCAP announced that its ratings would expire after six years, and implemented it on 31 December 2022.

== Controversy ==
ANCAP has been the subject of criticism. Equivalent testing in other markets (such as Euro NCAP and ASEAN NCAP) are regarded by manufacturers as equal to ANCAP, attracting comments regarding the efficacy and usefulness of a tax payer funded safety rating system after the collapse of the Automotive industry in Australia, as each test can cost the equivalent of $750,000 AUD. Additionally questions over the rating system itself have been raised. ANCAP has a focus on driver assistance systems, such as AEB, which are mandatory to achieve five stars. This allows some less-safe cars to attain high-ratings by using cheap electronics.

Controversy also arises over the rating system itself focusing on driver safety, rather than the safety of other road users. The 2022 Toyota Hilux attracted 5.71 deaths per 100 crashes, while the 2012 Mazda3 resulted in only 3.1 deaths per 100 crashes, almost half as many pedestrian fatalities. Regardless of this, the HiLux receives a higher ANCAP safety rating. Another controversy arises over testing methodology, which has failed to maintain constant throughout testing, resulting in system which cannot be used comparatively over any great length of time.

== Member organisations ==
The ANCAP website lists 21 member organisations, most of which are from Australia and New Zealand.

- ACT Justice and Community Safety Directorate
- Australian Automobile Association
- Australian Government – Department of Infrastructure and Regional Development
- Automobile Association of the Northern Territory
- Department of Logistics and Infrastructure
- FIA Foundation
- NRMA
- NZ Transport Agency
- Queensland Department of Transport & Main Roads
- Royal Automobile Association of South Australia
- Royal Automobile Club of Queensland
- Royal Automobile Club of Tasmania
- Royal Automobile Club of Victoria
- Royal Automobile Club of Western Australia
- SA Department for Infrastructure & Transport
- Building Tasmania
- Transport for NSW – Centre for Road Safety
- VicRoads
- Victorian Transport Accident Commission
- Western Australia Department of Transport
- Western Australia Office of Road Safety

== Testing ==
The average cost of producing one ANCAP rating is A$750,000 (US$563,900).

In 2019–2020, 95% of all new vehicles sold were tested.

In 2023, an underwater safety test was introduced.

== Comparison groups ==
The results are grouped into 18 increasingly demanding classes:

- 1993–1994
- 1995–1998
- 1999–2000
- 2001–2002
- 2003–2007
- 2008–2010
- 2011
- 2012
- 2013
- 2014
- 2015
- 2016
- 2017
- 2018–2019
- 2020–2022
- 2023–2025
- 2026-2028
- 2029+
