= BIHAMK =

Automobile association in Bosnia and Herzegovina

- Bosanskohercegovački auto-moto klub
- Predecessor: Bosanskohercegovačko automobilističko-motociklističko društvo
- Founded: 7 February 1946; 80 years ago
- Type: Automobile association
- Location: Sarajevo, Bosnia and Herzegovina
- Region served: Bosnia and Herzegovina
- Members: c. 60,000
- Website: www.bihamk.ba

The Bosnian-Herzegovinian Automobile and Motorcycle Club (Bosnian: Bosanskohercegovački auto-moto klub, abbreviated BIHAMK) is the national automobile association of Bosnia and Herzegovina, comparable to organizations such as the American Automobile Association (AAA) in the United States or the Automobile Association (AA) in the United Kingdom.

BIHAMK continues the tradition of organized automobile and motorcycle activity in Bosnia and Herzegovina, tracing its roots to the Bosanskohercegovačko automobilističko-motociklističko društvo, founded in February 1946, and the Auto-moto savez Bosne i Hercegovine, established in 1947.

The club provides a wide range of services to its members, including roadside technical assistance, real-time traffic and road condition reporting throughout Bosnia and Herzegovina, and the issuance of International Driving Permits.

BIHAMK is a member of several international organizations, including the Fédération Internationale de l’Automobile (FIA), the Alliance Internationale de Tourisme (AIT), and the Fédération Internationale de Motocyclisme (FIM).

== International membership ==
BIHAMK is a full member of:

- FIA - Fédération Internationale de l' Automobile
- AIT - Alliance Internationale de Tourisme
- FIM - Fédération Internationale de Motocyclisme
- EuroRAP - European Road Assessment organisation (since 2006.)
- ARC Europe - European Association of motoring clubs ( since 2007. participate in „Show your Card“ programme)

== See also ==
- FIA
- EuroRAP
- ARC Europe
