= Royal Automobile Association =

Motor club in Australia

Royal Automobile Association of South Australia
- Formation: 1902; 124 years ago
- Type: Roadside Assistance, Vehicle Inspection, Travel, Insurance, Child Safety Centre
- Headquarters: RAA City, 150 Grenfell St, Adelaide
- Location: South Australia, Australia
- Members: Approx 834,000
- President: Kathy Gramp
- Staff: 2700+
- Website: raa.com.au

The Royal Automobile Association of South Australia (RAA) is an Australian motoring club founded in 1903. The RAA provides services for members, including vehicle inspection, insurance, and roadside assistance.

The RAA originated as the Automobile and Motor Cycling Club of South Australia in 1903. The term "Motor Cycling" was dropped in 1904. The organisation was formally incorporated as an association in 1911. It received royal patronage in 1928. Finally, the name 'Royal Automobile Association of South Australia' was adopted in 1959.

== Road service ==
The RAA offers several membership types, with service access not restricted to South Australia. It is affiliated with similar clubs interstate and overseas, including: the RACV (Victoria), RACQ (Queensland), RACWA (Western Australia), RACT (Tasmania), NRMA (National), and AANT (Northern Territory). It responds to 400,000+ calls for emergency roadside assistance each year, with 90% of problems fixed at the roadside. Where roadside repair is not possible, RAA arranges for towing of the vehicle.

== History ==
=== 1903–1928 ===
On 30 September 1903, a group of South Australian motoring enthusiasts established a social motoring club called the Automobile and Motor Cycling Club of South Australia.

Early members participated in the Adelaide Hills hill climbs and reliability trials, contributing to the development of motorsport in South Australia. According to Reference.org, "at the time, there were few garages, and drivers often had to fix problems on their own."

The Automobile Club (as the RAA was called then) became an association in 1911. The RAA opposed speed limits, which were as low as 4 mph in some areas. They also opposed the use of police speed traps if only used to raise funds, but supported their use for safety.

In response to an increasing number of speeding prosecutions in the state, the association began distributing free road rules advice as a formal service, the first of its kind, as early as 1911. Other member benefits included a list of country hotels and the production of the state's first detailed road map. In 1913, it also began making road signs for direction indication.

The association was restructured into a fully-fledged service organisation in the early 1920s. Staffing levels grew from zero following the restructuring to about 36 by the end of the decade. By then, road service, technical, touring, and motoring road rules services were established, and the RAA Motor Insurance Policy was in place.

In 1928, the association was granted the prefix "Royal" by King George V, a sign of recognition from England and the State Government. This recognised the association's contributions, which included providing transport for wounded and sick soldiers returning from World War I.

=== 1929–1953 ===
In 1928, shortly before the enrolment of its 20,000th member, the RAA purchased its first freehold office at 49 Hindmarsh Square. During World War II, the RAA formed and operated the Civil Defence Transport Auxiliary, surveyed and mapped the state's roads for the military authorities, provided research into alternative fuels, and supported the cause in other ways. Economic challenges arose due to high inflation and more strict petrol rationing.

Since the early 1920s, the RAA had advocated for a single Road Traffic Act to replace about a dozen different Acts and hundreds of regulations. The RAA participated in the committee that drafted the Act, which came into force in 1937.

By 1947, the motoring organisations believed that rationing was no longer necessary and campaigned to remove it. The then Prime Minister Ben Chifley declined the request. Against a backdrop of accusations from the RAA that petrol was being used as a political weapon, Chifley was defeated in an election at the end of 1949. The incoming government quickly removed rationing.

The early 1950s brought a sharp rise in car ownership and RAA membership, which surpassed 75,000. Road Service was modernised as the original motorcycle units were replaced by vans. 'The Guides' became 'Patrols' and started using two-way radios, operating 24 hours a day out of new premises in North Adelaide.

By the RAA's Golden Jubilee in 1950, there were 140 staff, supported by seven country offices and 99 road service depots. Service records in 1953 showed 66,000 road service jobs, nearly 40,000 touring inquiries, 12,000 vehicle inspections, 84,000 technical inquiries, 1,300 motoring road rules inquiries, nearly one thousand court defences, and 20,000 insurance policies.

=== 1954–1978 ===
In 1959, the association changed its branding from the Automobile Association of SA to RAA.

As motoring and membership grew, the RAA moved into larger headquarters, built new technical premises, began its office and vehicle inspection centres in the suburbs, and established staffed offices in major country areas.

Although this period marked significant growth in motoring in South Australia, by the 1970s it was accompanied by emerging challenges. These included fears about the depletion of global crude oil reserves, increasing awareness of environmental pollution, differing opinions on the development of the freeway system, and the future of the motor car.

Against a backdrop of increasing taxes and charges, the RAA worked to improve petrol-selling hours in Adelaide, lobbied for the city's first central off-street parking, and advocated to get the Eyre Highway sealed. It succeeded on all three, and monitored developments such as parking meters, speed radar, seat belts, and breathalysers. Member services continued to evolve and improve. The RAA Travel Service, Driver Training, Traveller Shop, and Finance Service all began in this period. In contrast, an in-house Motoring Road Rules service began the advisory service previously handled by the solicitors.

The Touring Department planned caravan parks, initiated the star grading accommodation classification scheme, which is still used, and published its first touring guidebooks. Late in the 1950s, the RAA employed its first cartographer and began drawing in-house regional maps from which today's maps take their lineage.

A notable casualty of the 1970s was the RAA's role of providing much of the state's road signposting, a task it had handled for over half a century. During this time, inflation caused costs to escalate, with the last straw being the prospect of metric conversion, when distances changed from miles to kilometres.

During this period of expansion and development, the RAA's membership grew to 357,000.

=== 1979–present ===
In the early 1980s, South Australia experienced economic uncertainty and periodic recession. This era saw the association expand its services and combat competition in areas such as emergency road service.

In 1987, the RAA introduced RAA Plus, which included new services like insurance, travel planning assistance, travel packages and personal loans. 30 percent of members began using RAA Plus.

The RAA introduced a battery replacement service and later produced a touring information CD-ROM. During the 1980s, the Mapping Department moved from pen-and-ink drawing to a process known as scribing, and then to computer mapping. New operations included the Approved Repair Service and RAA Security Services.

Emergency road service has been based at three locations since 1979 and, like most operations, became heavily dependent on computer technology. Together with Technical Services, it was a prime consideration when a new property at Mile End was constructed, which has since become the association's headquarters.

Growing concern over car theft led to initiatives like the RAA's steering wheel lock, the full metal jacket to make cars more difficult to steal, and a vehicle etching scheme to deter professional thieves. This ongoing campaign culminated in the association organising a Vehicle Theft Summit in 2000. Similarly, the quest to lower the number of deaths and injuries on the roads resulted in the RAA Road Safety Summit during the same year.

The RAA has supported community initiatives such as an infant restraint hire scheme, alternative energy programs like the Pedal Prix, and participation in ANCAP crash testing for vehicle safety.

The RAA opened a new headquarters at Mile End in 2003, with additions in 2004 leading to the site including a branch office, Child Safety Centre, and Vehicle Inspection Centre.

By the start of 2010, total membership was 580,000, almost 61% of the state's 953,948 licensed drivers. In 2016, the total membership of the RAA in South Australia had increased to 665,321.

In 2007, the RAA's second-longest serving Chief Executive, John Fotheringham, retired after 19 years in the role due to health problems, with Ian Stone appointed as his successor.

The city branch returned to its historical location at 49 Hindmarsh Square in 2009.

In 2010, the RAA launched the new policy Mobility for Life, which embraces the use of all forms of transport at all stages of life. RAA Security Services was rebranded Secure Services as demand increased for Personal Alert Systems among retirees. This reflected a changing RAA, offering services other than motoring.

Following extensive renovations in 2020, the RAA announced in early 2024 their intentions to move into 150 Grenfell Street, less than 300 meters from their location on Hindmarsh Square.

In July 2025, Allianz Australia Insurance Limited acquired RAA Insurance Limited, now officially Allianz South Australia Insurance Ltd (Allianz SA).

== Offices ==
RAA has branches in the Adelaide central business district, West Croydon, Elizabeth, Modbury, Marion, Morphett Vale, and West Lakes.

=== Regional Centres ===
RAA has offices in Berri, Clare, Kadina, Mount Barker, Mount Gambier, Murray Bridge, Naracoorte, Port Augusta, Port Lincoln, Port Pirie, Renmark, Tanunda, Victor Harbor, Whyalla, and Broken Hill (New South Wales).
