= FDMS =

FDMS may refer to:

- Father Dueñas Memorial School, in Guam
- First Data Merchant Services
- Matsapha Airport, in Eswatini

== See also ==
- FDM (disambiguation)
