= RACT (disambiguation) =

RACT as an abbreviation may refer to:

- Royal Australian Corps of Transport, a branch of the Australian Army
- Royal Automobile Club of Tasmania, a motoring group in Tasmania, Australia
- Reasonably Available Control Technology, a pollution control standard
