= Better World Club =

The Better World Club (BWC) provides services to motorists in the United States and supports organizations seeking to reduce the environmental damage done by automobiles. BWC, which describes itself as "the nation's only environmentally friendly auto club", offers a bicycle membership and caters to hybrid vehicle owners. Nationwide membership was just under 20,000 people as of June 2006. In comparison, the rival American Automobile Association has 53 million members nationwide.

== History ==
Better World Club was founded by longtime friends Mitch Rofsky and Todd Silberman. It began signing up members on June 4, 2002. Rofsky and Silberman grew up as friends in Ohio and each pursued separate careers related to environmental responsibility and travel before coming together to form Better World Club. The idea initially came from environmentalists who reported that AAA used anti-environment lobbying practices. When they approached Mitch Rofsky with the idea, he realized that there was an opportunity to successfully compete with AAA.

== Services ==
Emergency roadside assistance

Emergency roadside assistance is available to drivers of both automobiles and bicycles. A bicycle membership can be purchased separately or added onto an auto policy for a smaller additional fee. Services are available across all 50 states and DC the US and Canada.

Automobile membership includes 4 service calls per year (defined as: towing, battery assistance, lockout assistance, flat tire assistance, fuel delivery or extrication) – if bicycle coverage is included these 4 calls can be split between auto and bike calls. Basic auto membership includes towing up to 5 miles, while the premium membership increases the limit to 100 miles. A bicycle-only membership provides service up to 30 miles annually with a limit of 2 service calls.

Travel products and services

Through TravelCool, Better World Club offers discounted travel with eco-friendly travel partners. Partners must emphasize sustainable practices such as recycling and building environmental awareness. Carbon offsets are included in the travel planning fee if a travel consultant is used. Discounts are available at eco-friendly lodgings, as well as at larger more well-known hotel chains. Discounts are also available on hybrid and biodiesel rental cars, available in select cities.

Trip route planning as well as maps covering North America from the city level up through the national level are available free to all members. Maps and travel planners are ordered by phone or email and delivered by mail within 7–14 days.

Insurance products and services

Better World Insurance, headquartered in Cambridge, Massachusetts, offers auto insurance as well as travel insurance. Carbon offsets are included free with the first year's auto insurance and offered for a nominal fee after that. Better World Insurance also advocates for pay-as-you-drive auto insurance, and offer it to customers in the limited locations where it is available.

Other benefits

Other member benefits include gas rebate coupons and discounts at other environmentally friendly companies both online and off. Hybrid car and biodiesel car owners receive a discount on membership (with gas-guzzlers that get less than 10 mi/gal being charged an additional surcharge). All members are eligible to receive the monthly newsletter, Kicking Asphalt, which includes news and information about environmental and travel related topics, new member discounts, and occasional calls for member activism. In order to preserve natural resources, this newsletter is distributed by email only.

== Partners ==
Better World Club partners include: Adventure Cycling Association, Car Talk, League of American Bicyclists, National Wildlife Federation, Organic Consumers Association, Washington Area Bicycle Association, and Working Assets.

== See also ==
- Recovery point
- Sustainable business
