= ARC Europe =

ARC Europe Group is the association of major European motoring clubs, principally active in the area of roadside assistance.

== 7 shareholders leading their local market ==
ARC Transistance - the initial name for ARC Europe - was founded in 1991 by 8 major automobile clubs in Europe:

- AA (United Kingdom)
- ACI (Italy)
- ADAC (Germany)
- ANWB (Netherlands)
- ÖAMTC (Austria)
- RACE (Spain)
- TCS (Switzerland)

== Subsidiaries ==
The Group institutionally consists of ARC Europe SA (Belgium) and its subsidiaries:

- ARC Europe France
- ARC Europe Greece
- ARC Europe Poland
- RAMK, Russia
- ARC Europe Group Insurance Brokerage

== History ==
In 1998 the brand ARC Europe was first registered by the above automobile clubs for new cooperation in the area of member services. On 1 January 2009, usage of the name and brand ARC Transistance was stopped and transferred to ARC Europe. All European cooperation activities in the organisation are now housed under the ARC Europe masterbrand.

Beyond the above shareholders, a significant number of other European non-founding clubs or similar organisations are affiliated with ARC Europe. Today, ARC Europe counts well over 35 clubs or service providers in Europe.

"ARC Europe SA" is a service company owned by the 8 major clubs which functions as a service and coordination center based in Brussels designed to serve member clubs in multiple ways : coordination plus development of business-to-business or business-to-consumer activities, cooperation in the area of international member discount programmes, trademark management, systems development, etc. The board of directors of ARC Europe SA includes the chief executives or senior officers of the founding clubs. The present managing director at ARC Europe is Stefano Sarti.

The major international member product proposed by ARC Europe is "Show your Card!", the European discount programme, which is connected with the AAA Show Your Card & Save programme in the United States, and with similar programmes in Canada, Mexico, Australia, South Africa, Sri Lanka, South Korea, Jamaica, Japan, and in multiple other places, allowing more than 100 million members from sister clubs to access discounts within this worldwide "discount" web. ARC Europe Show your Card! partners include companies such as Hertz, Hard Rock Cafe, Best Western and many more. There are over 25,000 outlets in Europe offering Show your Card! discounts to club members.

== Products ==
ARC Europe Group provides different services:

- Roadside assistance
- SARA (Service Activated Roadside Assistance)
- Accident Loyalty
- Tyre insurance
