= List of Iranian provincial governors under President Khatami =

This is a list of Iranian provincial general-governors

Province	General-governor's name	
Province	English	Persian
Ardabil	Javad Negarandeh	جواد نگارنده
Bushehr	Esmail Tabadar	اسماعیل تبادار
Chahar Mahaal and Bakhtiari	Mahmoud Zamani-Ghomi	محمود زمانی قمی
East Azarbaijan	Mohammad Ali Sobhanollahi	محمدعلی سبحان‌اللهی
Esfahan	Seyyed Mortaza Nezamol'eslam Bakhtiari	سید مرتضي نظام الاسلام بختياري
Fars	Seyyed Mohamood Moosavi	سید محمود موسوی
Gilan	Masoud Soltanifar	مسعود سلطانی‌فر
Golestan	Mohammad Hashem Mohaymeni	محمدهاشم مهیمنی
Hamadan	Mohamad nasser Nikbakht	محمد ناصر نيکبخت
Hormozgan	Abdolhossein Moghtadaee	عبدالحسین مقتدائی
Ilam	Mohammad Reza Morvarid	محمد رضا مروارید
Kerman	Mohammad Ali Karimi-Abarghoui	محمدعلی کریمی ابرقویی
Kermanshah	Ahmad Torknezhad	احمد ترکنژاد
Khuzestan	Fathollah Moin	فتح‌الله معین
Kohkiluyeh and Buyer Ahmad	Esmail Dousti	اسماعیل دوستی
Kurdistan	Abdulmohammad Zahedi	عبدالمحمد زاهدی
Lorestan	Hooshang Bazvand	هوشنگ بازوند
Mazandaran	Mohammad Ali Panjeh-Fouladgaran	محمدعلی پنجه فولادگران
Markazi	Abdolmohammad Zahedi	عبدالمحمد زاهدی
North Khorasan	Mohsen Nariman	محسن نریمان
Qazvin	Fariborz Mahmoudian	فریبرز محمودیان
Qom	Hamid Tahaee	سیدحمید طهائی
Razavi Khorasan	Hassan Rasouli	سیدحسن رسولی
Semnan	Hamid Haji-Abdolvahab	حميد حاجی‌عبدالوهاب
Sistan and Baluchistan	Hossein Amini	حسین امینی
South Khorasan	Ebrahim Rezaei Babadi	fa:ابراهیم رضایی بابادی
Tehran	Hossein Hashemi	سید حسین هاشمی
West Azarbaijan	Jamshid Ansari	جمشید انصاری
Yazd	Abolghasem Aasi	ابوالقاسم عاصي
Zanjan	Jafar Rahmanzadeh	جعفر رحمانزاده
