= FDM =

FDM or fdm may refer to:

- Fascial distortion model, a model of medicine developed by American physician Stephen Typaldos
- Fat in dry matter, a measurement of fat content in the dry matter of cheeses
- fdm (software), a mail delivery agent and email filtering software
- FDM Group, a British multinational information technology consulting company
- Federation of Danish Motorists, an automobile association
- Finite difference method, a class of numerical techniques for solving differential equations
- Flight operations quality assurance (also flight data monitoring), a method of capturing, analyzing and/or visualizing the data generated by an aircraft
- Free Download Manager, computer software
- Frequency-division multiplexing, a technique by which the total bandwidth available in a communication medium is divided
- Fused filament fabrication (also fused deposition modeling), a 3D-printing process
