= Breakdown (vehicle) =

Mechanical failure

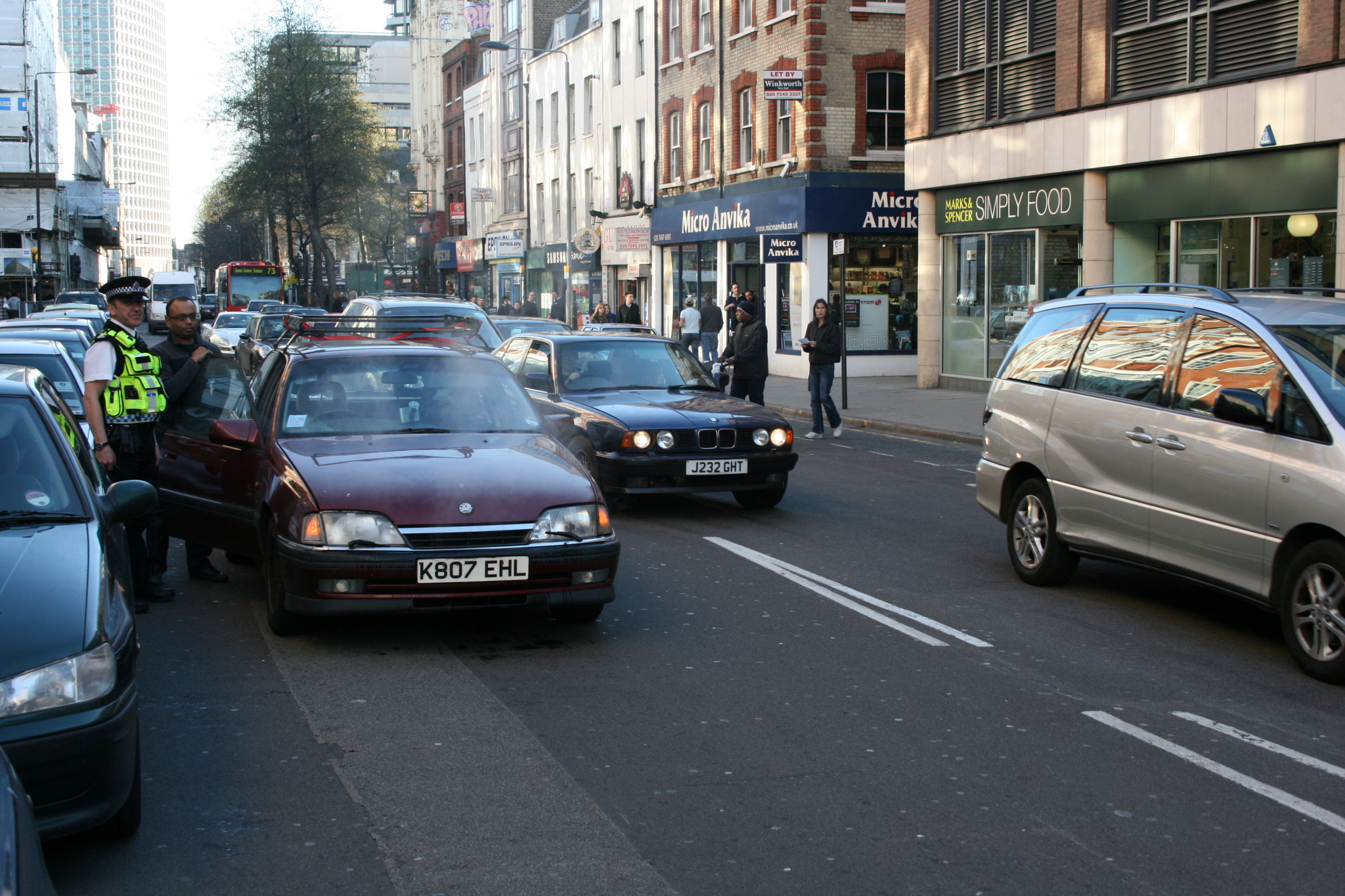
An overheated Vauxhall Carlton stopped on Tottenham Court Road, London

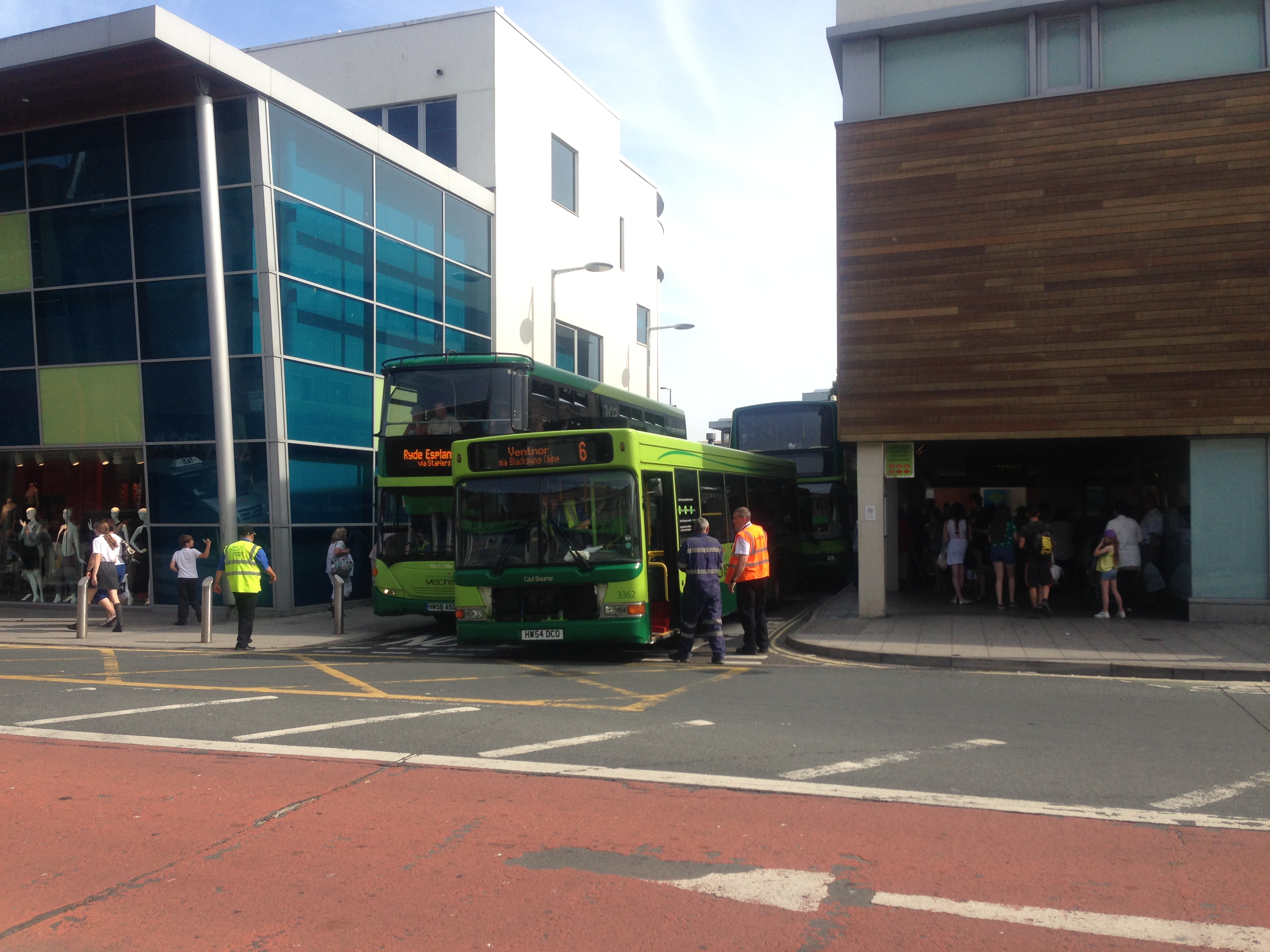
A broken down Plaxton Pointer 2 bodied Dennis Dart SLF in Newport, Isle of Wight

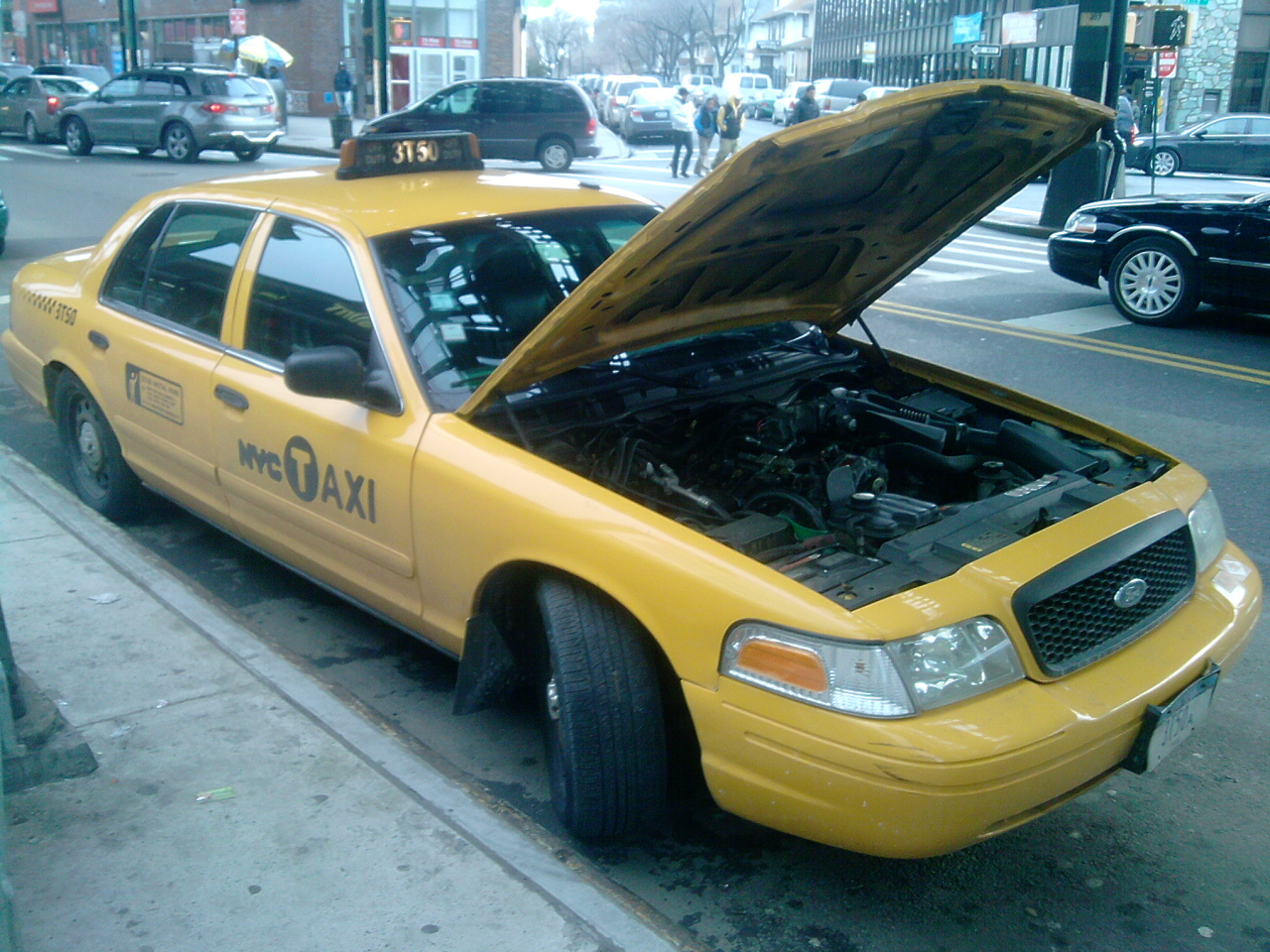
A broken down Ford Crown Victoria in New York city in 2009

A vehicle breakdown is a mechanical or electrical failure of a motor vehicle that renders the vehicle inoperable or causes further operation of the vehicle to be unsafe.

Vehicle breakdowns have various causes. Depending on the severity, the vehicle may need to be towed to an automobile repair shop or fixed on-site by roadside assistance or a mobile mechanic. With other problems, the driver may be able to operate the vehicle seemingly normally for some time, but the vehicle will need an eventual repair. Many vehicle owners with personal economic difficulty or a busy schedule may wait longer than they should to get necessary maintenance or repairs made to their vehicles, thereby increasing their chances of a breakdown, inducing further damage to the vehicle, or else causing more danger.

== Causes ==
In 2014, The Royal Automobile Club (RAC) attended almost two million breakdowns in the United Kingdom. Battery problems were the most common cause of a car breakdown, accounting for more than 450,000 call-outs.

=== Top 10 causes ===
1. Dead or faulty battery
2. Engine issues
3. Faulty alternator
4. Damaged tyre & wheel
5. Electrical issues
6. Starter motor problem
7. Damaged clutch wire
8. Brake problems
9. Fuel problems
10. Lost car keys

== Contributing factors ==
Roadside assistance data collected, analyzed and published by AAA provides the following statistical insights into vehicle breakdowns in the United States and Canada:

=== Age ===
- Vehicles ten years and older are twice as likely to end up immobilized on the side of the road compared to newer vehicles, and the odds of needing a tow quadruples.
- Vehicles fewer than five years old have a higher proportion of tire, key and fuel-related issues than older vehicles.
- One in five service calls for a newer vehicle required a tow to a repair facility.
- Vehicles between six and ten years old have the highest proportion of battery-related issues, as most batteries have a three-to-five-year life.

=== Maintenance ===
- Millions of roadside breakdowns each year could be prevented with basic vehicle maintenance.
- 35 percent of Americans have skipped or delayed service or repairs that were recommended by a mechanic or specified by the factory maintenance schedule.

=== Region ===
- Drivers in the West experienced the most breakdowns, followed by the South, the Northeast and the Midwest.

=== Season ===
- Roadside assistance calls peak in the summer (8.3 million) followed by winter (8.1 million), fall (7.8 million) and spring (7.7 million).

== Coverage ==
When a breakdown occurs, the motorist may be able to have the tow and/or repair covered by a third party:

=== Factory warranty ===
- A vehicle manufacturer's warranty often covers the repair and subsequent towing expense if the root cause of the repair is deemed warrantable and is repaired at a certified dealership.

=== Extended warranty/service contract ===
- A service contract is a type of extended warranty (although may not be legally considered a true warranty) that is typically available for purchase at the time of the vehicle sale and usually includes roadside assistance.

=== Insurance ===
- An auto insurance policy provides liability coverage for any damage caused by a vehicle, however, some comprehensive policies also cover repairs, roadside assistance services, tow and rental expenses.

=== Roadside assistance ===
- A roadside assistance plan may be available for purchase through club membership or in some cases, as an add-on service from another subscription, such as a mobile phone.

== See also ==
- Automobile repair shop
- Mobile mechanic
- Roadside assistance
- Tow truck
- Car insurance
- Car warranty
- Extended warranty
