= Touring and Automobile Club of Colombia =

Touring & Automovil Club de Colombia
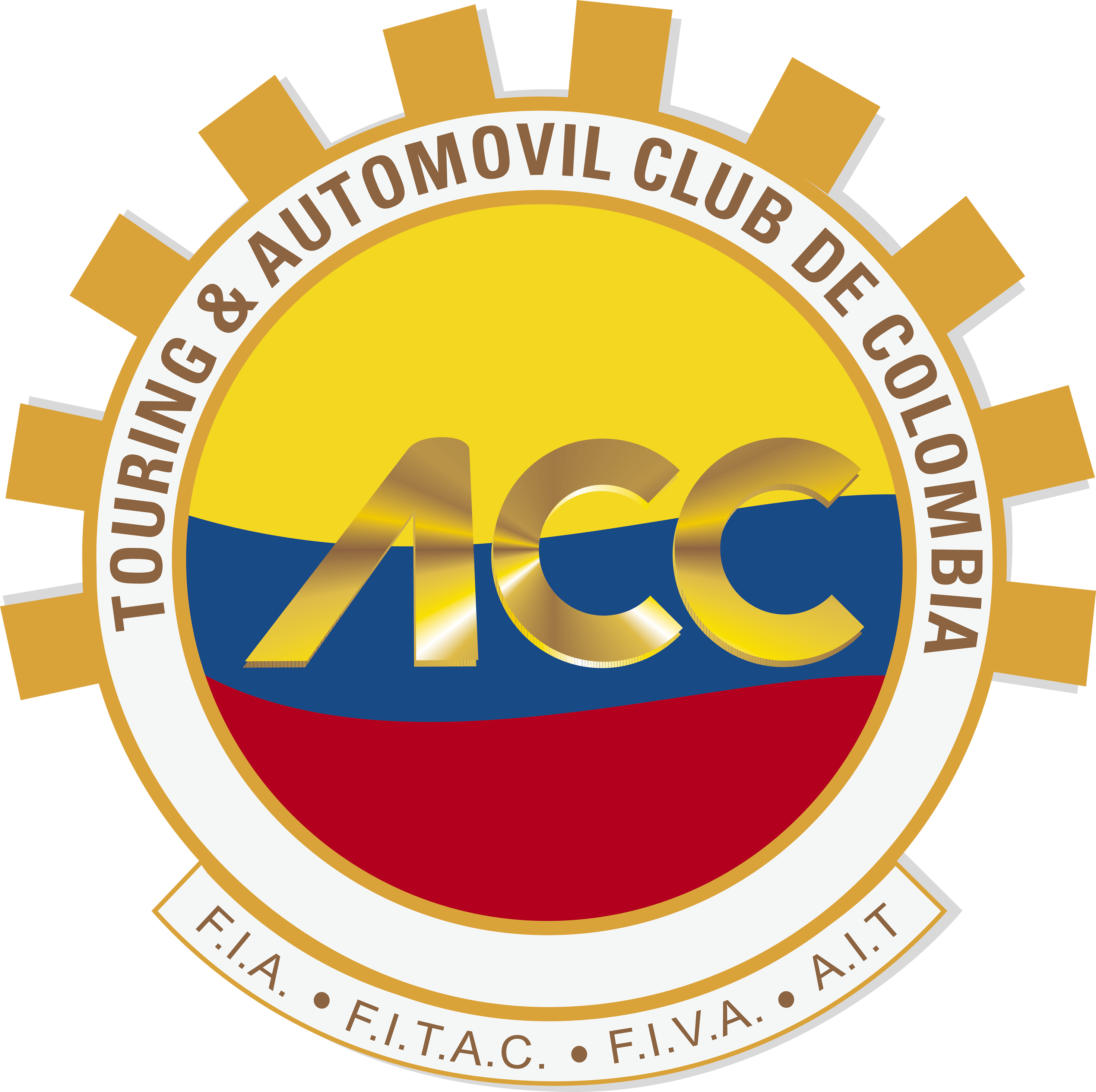
- Abbreviation: ACC
- Formation: 10 October 1940
- Type: Sports federation
- Location: Bogotá, Colombia
- Region served: International
- Official language: English; French; Spanish
- President: (Colombia) Ricardo Morales Rubio
- Main organ: General Assembly
- Affiliations: FIA Institute; FIA Foundation; NACAM; FIVA
- Website: www.acc.com.co

The Touring & Automovil Club de Colombia, or simply ACC, is a nonprofit organization located throughout the territory Colombia, which gives assistance the traveler, mechanic, support motorsport and provides related car services. It was founded on October 10 of 1940, is part of the FIA International Automobile Federation, AIT International Tourism Alliance FIVA International Federation of older vehicles.

== History ==
At the end of the 30 national roads and highways were too rudimentary for any vehicle, so the mishaps were common and took ages to reach solutions. For this reason, the first owners of vehicles in Colombia saw the need to unite in seeking timely and safe solutions, exchange ideas and knowledge about mechanical and disseminate the art of driving.

Although the idea seemed to be only a small circle of friends, a group of enterprising men fresh from Paris, decided to unite to form a company using the example of the work done in Paris by a body responsible for advising drivers in all their needs International Automobile Federation.

The question was how to adapt the French experience to the Colombian situation? The answer was a real challenge, but a group of forty friends led by Gustavo Santos Montejo, decide on October 10, 1940 to give life to the Automobile Club of Colombia in Bogotá. However, it was only until April 16, 1941 through Resolution No. 33 (Executive) of the Ministry of Justice is given legal life to this institution which has since acquired a private civil nature and nonprofit.

As anecdote asserts that one of the first beneficiaries of the service of the newly founded Touring & Automobile Club of Colombia, was the President of the Republic, Eduardo Santos who was traveling in the company of Villeta Lorencita Dona Villegas de Santos and Packard in which they were traveling, suffered a mechanical failure that was treated immediately by the ACC.

== National coverage ==
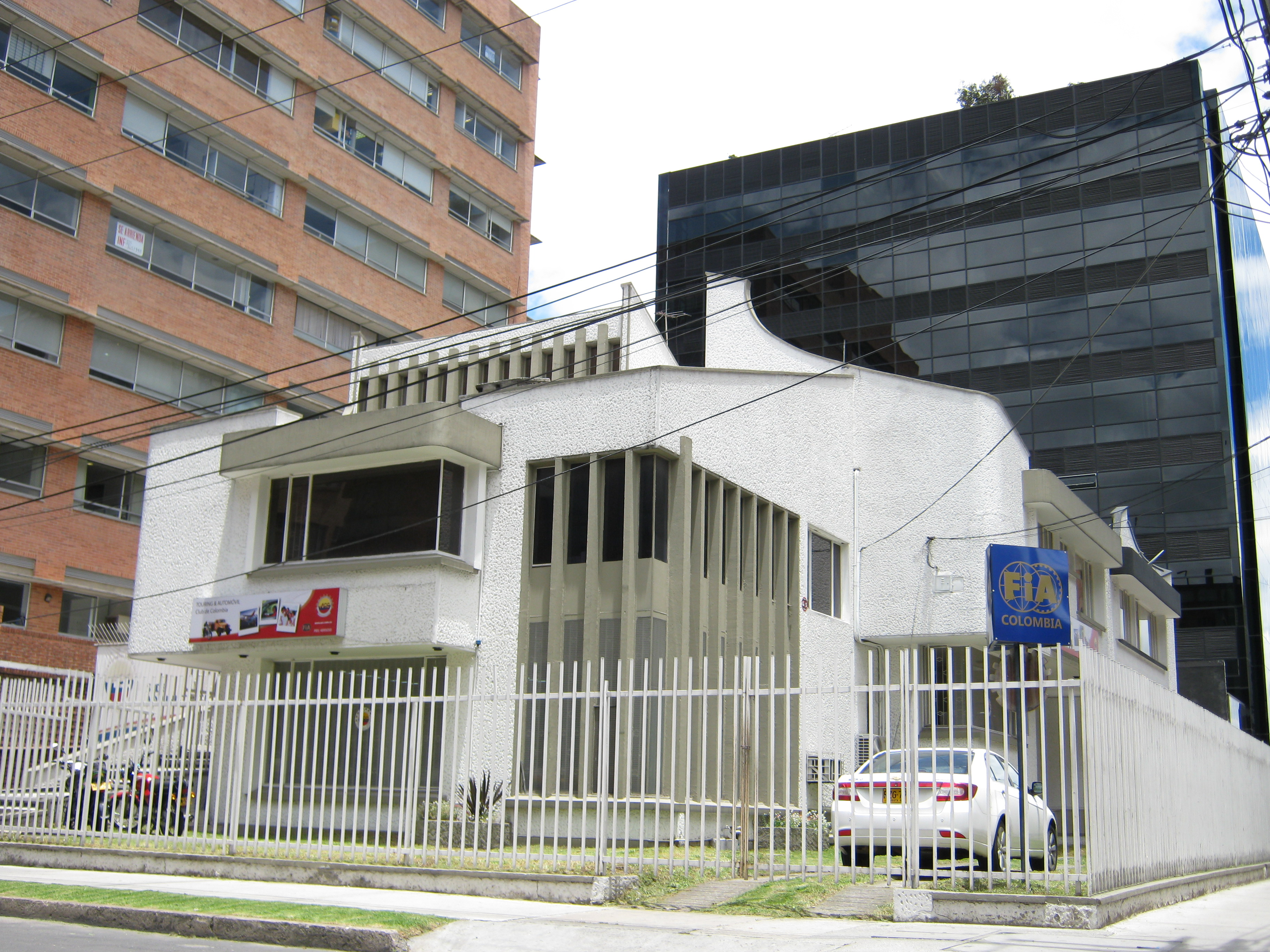
Headquarters of Automobile Club of Colombia Bogotá

The ACC provides coverage throughout the country and has offices Colombian official.

- Bogotá
- Bucaramanga
- Cartagena
- Pereira
