= Urgent.ly =

Roadside assistance technology company

- Type: Public
- Traded as: Nasdaq: ULY
- Industry: Auto, Automotive services, mobility services
- Founded: 1 January 2013
- Founders: Ric Fleisher, Surendra Goel, Luke Kathol, Lokesh Kumar, Rick Robinson, and Chris Spanos
- Headquarters: Vienna, Virginia, United States
- Areas served: North America, Europe, Asia, Australia
- Key people: Matt Booth (CEO and President), Gabe Huerta (Chief Product Officer), Annie Flippo (Chief Data Officer), Tim Huffmyer (Chief Financial Officer)
- Services: Roadside-as-a-Service, Roadside Assistance, Mobility Assistance, Automotive Technology
- Number of employees: 300+
- Website: www.geturgently.com

Urgent.ly is a roadside assistance and mobility assistance technology company that was founded in May 2013 and is based in Vienna, Virginia. It operates in North America, Europe, Asia, and Australia.

== Mobile app ==
The app connects users with roadside assistance providers. Users pay the service providers directly through the app. The app was added to the AT&T Drive platform in 2015.

== History ==
Urgent.ly was founded in May 2013 and launched its service in April 2014, initially servicing Washington, DC and the surrounding areas. Later that year, the service expanded nationwide across the United States and Puerto Rico.

In March 2015, the app was chosen to be added to the AT&T Drive platform for connected cars. In February 2017, Washington, DC–based media company DC Inno reported Urgent.ly's partnership with carmaker Mercedes-Benz.

On December 6, 2017, CCC Information Services, Inc. announced Urgent.ly as an addition to the CCC Network.

On January 23, 2018, Urgent.ly announced integration with Towbook, a provider of cloud-based towing software for roadside assistance companies.

On April 3, 2018, Uber announced Urgent.ly as a partner on the Uber-branded Visa Debit Card for Uber drivers. Urgent.ly roadside assistance is available to all Uber drivers for a monthly fee, and cardholders receive a discount.

On October 19, 2023, Urgent.ly announces the successful closing of the merger with Otonomo Technologies and effectiveness of S-1 registration statement and starts the public trading under the ticker symbol ULY under NASDAQ.

== Funding ==
In April 2014, CIT Gap Funds and Blu Venture invested $525,000 in seed funding into Urgent.ly.

In October 2014, Select Venture Partners invested $1.2 million in pre-Series A funding with contributions from CIT Gap Funds and Blu Venture.

In September 2015, Allianz Digital Corporate Ventures, Verizon Ventures, and Forte Ventures invested in a $7 million Series A round.

In October 2017, American Tire Distributors, Verizon Ventures, and Forté Ventures invested $10 million in the Series B round.

In January 2019, Urgent.ly announced it had raised $21 million in new Series B funding with participation from BMW i Ventures; InMotion Ventures, Jaguar Land Rover's venture capital fund; and Porsche Ventures, with support from current investors.
