= Ebrahim Rezaei Babadi =

Iranian politician

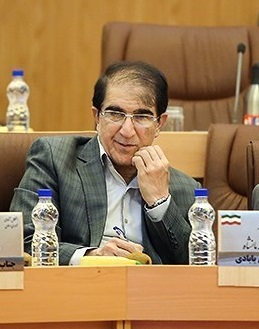
- Ebrahim Rezaei Babadi (2015)

Governor of Kermanshah
- In office 30 November 2013 – 21 September 2015
- Preceded by: Hojat-Allah Damiad
- Succeeded by: Asadollah Razani

Governor of South Khorasan
- In office 2004–2005
- Succeeded by: Sowlat Mortazavi

Personal details
- Born: Abadan, Khuzestan, Iran
- Education: University of Tabriz
- Profession: Politician
- Website: rezaeibabadi.ir

Ebrahim Rezaei Babadi (Persian: ابراهیم رضایی بابادی, born 1955) is an Iranian politician, and the former president of Touring & Automobile Club of the Islamic Republic of Iran.
He was the 14th Governor-general of Kermanshah Province, Iran from November 2013 to September 2015 in the Cabinet of Hassan Rouhani and first Governor-general of South Khorasan Province in the 2nd Cabinet of Mohammad Khatami.

Political offices
Preceded by N/A	1st Governor-general of South Khorasan; 2004 - 2006	Succeeded by Soulat Mortazavi
Preceded by Hojat-Allah Damiad	Governor-general of Kermanshah; 2013 - 2015	Succeeded by Asadollah Razani
