= Saudi Automobile and Motorcycle Federation =

Governing body for motorsport in Saudi Arabia

- Sport: Motorsport
- Jurisdiction: Saudi Arabia
- Abbreviation: SAMF
- Founded: 2006; 20 years ago
- Headquarters: Riyadh, Saudi Arabia
- President: Prince Khalid bin Sultan Al-Abdullah Al-Faisal

Official website
- samf.gov.sa

The Saudi Automobile and Motorcycle Federation (SAMF; Arabic: الاتحاد السعودي للسيارات والدراجات النارية) is the governing body for car and motorcycle sport in Saudi Arabia. Founded in 2006 and based in Riyadh, it oversees national championships and supports international motorsport events held in the country. It represents Saudi Arabia in international motorsport bodies, including the Fédération Internationale de l'Automobile (FIA), the Fédération Internationale de Motocyclisme (FIM) and the Fédération Internationale des Véhicules Anciens (FIVA). Its events are held under the supervision of the Ministry of Sport.

== History ==
The federation was established in 2006. In 2025, the FIA World Baja Cup season opened with the Saudi Baja, which the FIA described as marking 20 years of organised motorsport in Saudi Arabia.

In November 2021, the federation launched the Saudi Motorsport Company, a commercial body to promote major race events in the country, including the Saudi Arabian Grand Prix. Before then, motorsport events in the Kingdom were run by the federation or by private companies.

In 2023, the federation's president outlined a 20-year programme to build a domestic motorsport industry. It includes race circuits in several regions, racing academies, and attracting teams that build rally cars to Saudi Arabia.

== Leadership ==
The federation's president is Prince Khalid bin Sultan Al-Abdullah Al-Faisal, who also chairs the Saudi Motorsport Company.

== Events ==
=== International events ===
The federation supports the international motorsport events held in Saudi Arabia. These include the Dakar Rally, which moved to Saudi Arabia in 2020, and the Saudi Arabian Grand Prix in Formula One. The Dakar Rally is organised by the Amaury Sport Organisation in collaboration with the Saudi Motorsport Company, which operates under the federation's umbrella.

In 2026, the FIA announced that the 2027 Dakar Rally in Saudi Arabia would not take place as scheduled because of conflict in the region. The decision was taken in coordination with the federation. Saudi Arabia is due to host the 50th edition of the rally in 2028.

=== National championships ===
The federation organises the Saudi Toyota Championship, a series of national competitions sponsored by Abdul Latif Jameel Motors. Its disciplines include rallying, time attack, autocross, drag racing and hill climb. It also organises the Saudi Desert Rally Championship and the Saudi Toyota Drift Championship.

== See also ==
- Motorsport in Saudi Arabia
- Saudi Arabian Grand Prix
- Dakar Rally
