= Royal Automobile Club of Spain =

Motor club in Spain

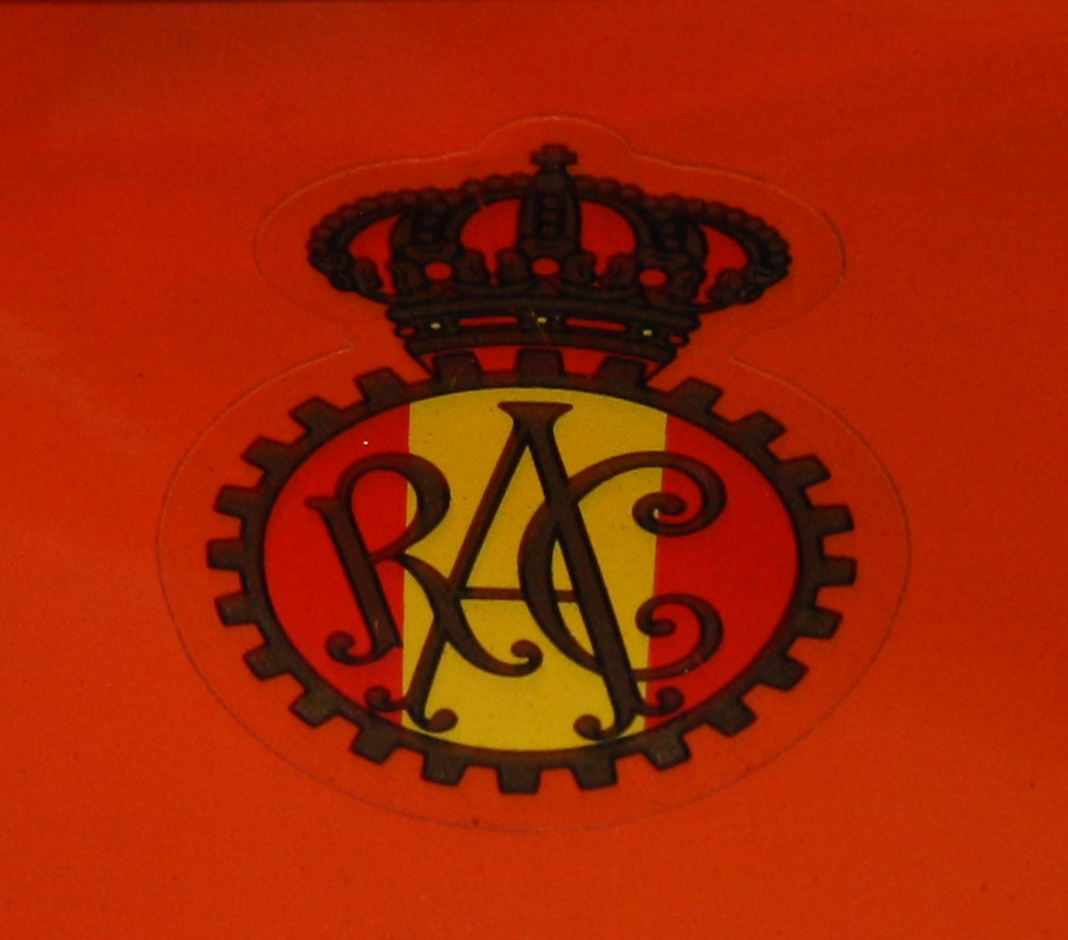
- Founded: 1903
- Headquarters: Madrid, Spain

The Royal Automobile Club of Spain, Spanish: Real Automóvil Club de España (RACE) is a motor club/car club in Spain.

It is the Spanish equivalent of the American Automobile Association (AAA) in the United States of America, or the Automobile Association (AA) in the United Kingdom or the ANWB in the Netherlands.

The club was formed in 1903 to provide roadside service to drivers in Spain. Along with other European automobile clubs RACE formed ARC Europe to provide reciprocal and cross border business services.

RACE is a member of the Alliance Internationale de Tourisme.

== Research ==
As well as being an active automobile club, RACE also undertakes road safety research acting as a trusted advisor to the motorist in Spain.

=== EuroRAP in Spain ===
RACE is one of the active members for the European Road Assessment Programme (EuroRAP)in Spain. RACE along with RACC regularly publish maps showing safety characteristics of Spains's roads as well as the risk of being involved in an accident.

The safety rating maps are based on EuroRAP's Road Protection Score Protocol (or Star Rating Protocol) is a measure of how well a road protects road users in the event of an accident. Data on road characteristics is gathered by driving through road inspections using a specially equipped RPS inspection vehicle (Strassentest vehicle in German). Trained assessors then rate the safety features and hazards on the inspected road and use standardised formula to produce a safety rating—star rating—which is comparable across Europe.

== Campaigning for safe road design ==
The European Campaign for Safe Road Design is a partnership between 28 major European road safety stakeholders, calling for the European Economic Community to invest in safe road infrastructure initiatives which could cut deaths on European roads by 33% in less than a decade. RACE is one of the campaign's partners in Spain, along with the Reial Automòbil Club de Catalunya (RACC).
