= Federation of Danish Motorists =

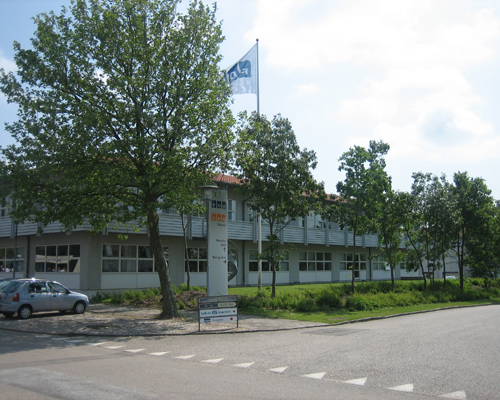
FDM's headquarter in Lyngby

The Federation of Danish Motorists (Danish: Forenede Danske Motorejere, abbreviated FDM) is an organisation created in 1909 as a spin-off from the Danish automotive interests magazine Motor (Danish for Engine), which was published since 1906. With the exception of 2009, FDM has had a rising number of members since its creation, and in 2010 had 238,000 members.

The organisation offers both technical and legal assistance and advice to its members, and has taken several legal cases to court on behalf of its members, covering seat malfunctions, parking fines and used car sales.

== Motor ==
The magazine Motor is still a central part of what FDM does, and with more than 434,000 subscribers it is the largest automotive magazine in Denmark.

== International participation ==
FDM is a member organisation of FIA and ARC Europe.

== See also ==
- Danish Cyclists Federation
