= Stephen Typaldos =

- Education: Doctor of Osteopathic Medicine
- Alma mater: University of Health Sciences College of Osteopathic Medicine
- Occupation: Physician

Stephen Typaldos, D.O. (March 25, 1957 – April 5, 2006) was an American physician who was the founder of the Fascial Distortion Model, an anatomical and physiological model of medicine.

== Early life and education ==
Typaldos graduated from the University of Health Sciences College of Osteopathic Medicine in Kansas City, Missouri in 1986, completed his internship and residency in Ohio, practiced in Maryland from 1989 to 1991 and then moved to Yuba City, CA. Board certified in Family Medicine, Typaldos was pursuing his certification in Neuromusculoskeletal medicine at the time of his death.

== Development of Fascial Distortion Model (FDM) ==
Typaldos discovered the first fascial distortion, which he called a triggerband, in September 1991 in Yuba City, CA. Later that month he discovered, defined and successfully treated herniated trigger points. The first continuum distortion was discovered in March 1992. Typaldos gave the first lecture on his discoveries in Las Vegas on March 25, 1992 (his 35th birthday).

By early 1993 he had envisioned folding distortions and began using the term Fascial Distortion Model. He completed writing his first three papers in April 1993 and they were subsequently published in the AAO Journal in 1994 and 1995. These articles described only four fascial distortions and included artist’s drawings of the distortions that had come from cadaver studies in the lab. By 1995 Typaldos had discovered the other two distortions (cylinder distortions and tectonic fixations) and felt that there were only six.

He developed many of his early treatments working in the Emergency room setting, while employed by EMCare (an ER staffing firm) in Plainview, Texarkana, Ennis, and Ft. Worth, Texas from 1992 to 1996, and then later in his practice in Brewer, Maine.

“The fascial distortion model is an anatomical perspective in which the underlying etiology of virtually every musculoskeletal injury (and many neurological and medical conditions as well) is considered to be comprised of one or more of six specific pathological alterations of the body’s connecting tissues (fascial bands, ligaments, tendons, retinacula, etc.). This model not only allows for strikingly effective manipulative treatments for diverse afflictions such as pulled muscles, fractures, and frozen shoulders, but the results are objective, obvious, measurable, and immediate.”

From 1992 to 2005 Typaldos presented numerous seminars in the USA and around the world (Austria, Japan, France, Portugal, and Germany) as he taught physicians and international osteopaths his insights and treatments for musculoskeletal injuries and pain. In his book Typaldos hypothesized FDM treatments for preventing heart attacks and detailed his personal experience in treating patients with post-stroke paralysis.

Furthermore, FDM was viewed by Typaldos as a link between fascial anatomy and orthopedic surgery, the understanding of which he believed would lead to better surgical outcomes.

== Personal life ==
Typaldos was born in Pasadena, California, and died at the age of 49 In Bangor, ME.

== Publications ==
Investigating the Combined Effects of Fascial Distortion Model Manual Therapy and Balance–Strength Training in Individuals with Chronic Ankle Instability. Sports. 2024; 12(1):33. https://doi.org/10.3390/sports12010033

Introducing the Fascial Distortion Model, American Academy of Osteopathy (AAO) Journal, Vol.4, No. 2, Summer 1994: 14-18, 30-36. (Reprinted in UK) The Osteopath, Vol.1, No.2, Spring 1995.

Triggerband Technique, AAO Journal, Vol.4, No.4, Winter 1994: 15-18, 30-33. (Reprinted in UK) The Osteopath, Vol.1, No.3, Summer 1995.

Continuum Technique, AAO Journal, Vol.5, No.2, Summer 1995: 15-19. (Reprinted in UK) The Osteopath, Vol.1, No,4, Autumn 1995.

Cylinder Distortions, Still Alive (Electronic Journal), December 1995.

Orthopathic Medicine: The Unification of Orthopedics with Osteopathy Through the Fascial Distortion Model • First Edition, 1997, Orthopathic Global Health Publications (OGHP), Brewer, ME • Second Edition, 1998, OGHP, Brewer, ME • Third Edition, 1999, OGHP, Brewer, ME • Japanese Edition, 1998, Sky East Publishing, Tokyo, Japan • German Edition, Verlag für Ganzheltiliche Medicin (VGM), Kötzting, Germany, 1999

FDM – Clinical and Theoretical Application of the Fascial Distortion Model Within the Practice of Medicine and Surgery • 2002, Orthopathic Global Health Publications (OGHP), Brewer, ME • Japanese Edition, 2004, FDM Asia Association, Fukuoka, Japan
