= Cyprus Automobile Association =

- Official logo
- Formation: 1933
- Type: Non-profit
- Headquarters: Nicosia
- Location: Cyprus
- President: Antonis Michaelides
- Website: www.cyprusaa.org

The Cyprus Automobile Association (Cyprus AA or CAA; Greek: Κυπριακός Σύνδεσμος Αυτοκινήτου) (Turkish: Kıbrıs Otomobil Federasyonu (KOF)) is a non-profit organization governed by an elected council.

== Overview ==
Founded in 1933, it has the aim of offering assistance to the private motorist, in Cyprus and abroad, and to promote the interests of car owners in general. The CAA is a member of the Fédération Internationale de l'Automobile (FIA) and the Alliance Internationale de Tourisme (AIT).

== Responsibility ==
The CAA is also responsible for organising the annual Cyprus Rally, the Troödos Rally (part of the Middle East Rally circuit), and the Cyprus Rally Championship, as well as the Historic Cyprus Rally.

== See also ==
- Automobile Club d'Italia
- The Automobile Association
