= Mohammad-Hashem Mohaymeni =

Iranian politician (born 1955)

Mohammad Hashem Mohaimeni (or Mohaymeni) (born 1955 in Gorgan, Iran) was appointed the third governor general of Golestan province, Iran in May 2002.
