= Automobile Association of Bangladesh =

Automobile association in Bangladesh

- Abbreviation: AAB
- Formation: 1953
- Type: Sports federation
- Purpose: Motorsports
- Location: 3/B, Outer Circular Road, Maghbazar, Dhaka-1217
- Region served: Bangladesh
- Official language: Bengali, English
- Affiliations: Fédération Internationale de l'Automobile Alliance Internationale de Tourisme Commission Internationale de Karting
- Website: aabangladesh.com

Automobile Association of Bangladesh
- Jurisdiction: Bangladesh
- Founded: 1953
- Affiliation: FIA
- President: Ajmalul Hossain KC
- (Bangladesh)

The Automobile Association of Bangladesh (abbreviated AAB; Bengali: বাংলাদেশ অটোমোবাইল সমিতি) is a non-profit organisation and the governing body of motorsport in Bangladesh. It was established in 1953. It is a member of Fédération Internationale de l'Automobile. It is the only organisation authorised to issue IDPs for Bangladeshis.

== See also ==
- Automobile association
- List of motorsport championships
