= Australian Automobile Association =

Organization

- Abbreviation: AAA
- Formation: 1924
- Purpose: Motoring Organisation
- Location: Australia
- Region served: Australia
- Members: Australia Motoring Organisations
- President: Geoff Cosgriff
- Main organ: Governing Board
- Website: www.aaa.asn.au

The Australian Automobile Association (AAA) is an Australian motoring organisation that lobbies for road users across Australia. This includes advocating for the safe maintenance of land transport networks and increasing transport affordability. It was established in 1924.

== International membership ==
The AAA is a member of the Alliance Internationale de Tourisme (AIT) and the Federation Internationale de l'Automobile (FIA).

== Member organisations ==
Most Australian state motor organisations are members of the AAA:

- Royal Automobile Club of Australia
- NRMA, New South Wales and ACT
- Royal Automobile Club of Victoria
- Royal Automobile Club of Queensland
- Royal Automobile Association of South Australia
- Royal Automobile Club of Western Australia
- Royal Automobile Club of Tasmania
- Automobile Association of the Northern Territory

Annual conferences were conducted in each state over time.

== Motor sport ==
In 1926, the AAA sought authority to administer motor sport in Australia, which was subsequently obtained via the Royal Automobile Club.

Following a decision to focus on its primary role, the association relinquished this authority to the Confederation of Australian Motor Sport, formed in 1953.
