= Touring and Automobile Club of Peru =

Automobile organisation in Peru

- Touring y Automóvil Club del Perú
- Abbreviation: TACP
- Formation: May 20, 1924; 101 years ago
- Founder: Marino Edmundo Tabusso
- Founded at: Lima, Peru
- Type: Nonprofit
- Headquarters: Lima, Peru
- President: Iván Dibós Mier
- Website: www.touring.pe

The Touring and Automobile Club of Peru (Spanish: Touring y Automóvil Club del Perú, TACP) is a non-profit organisation in Peru founded in 1924 that provides automobile services, as well as the country's best-known driving course. The TACP is a member of the Fédération Internationale de l'Automobile and the Alliance Internationale de Tourisme.

== History ==
The organisation was founded as the Touring Club Peruano on May 20, 1924.

From 1968 to 2005, its driving school was a service unit of the organisation, when it became independent as the Touring Escuela S.A., later renamed to Trinidad Morán, with the TACP serving as one of its main shareholders. This independent school was disestablished in 2016 due to a change in the guidelines provided by the country's Ministry of Transport and Communications (MTC). In 2026, it presented a proposal to the MTC to continue operating its centres south of Lima.

== List of presidents ==
- 1924–1930: Marino Edmundo Tabusso
- 1930–1964: Eduardo Dibós Dammert
- 1965–1979: Alfonso Bryce Lostanau
- 1979–1998: Percy Griffiths Escardó
- 1998–2011: Godfrey Hemmerde Castaños
- 2011–present: Iván Dibós Mier

== See also ==
- Driver's education
- Peruvian Automobile Club
