= Riksförbundet M Sverige =

Swedish organization for motor vehicle owners

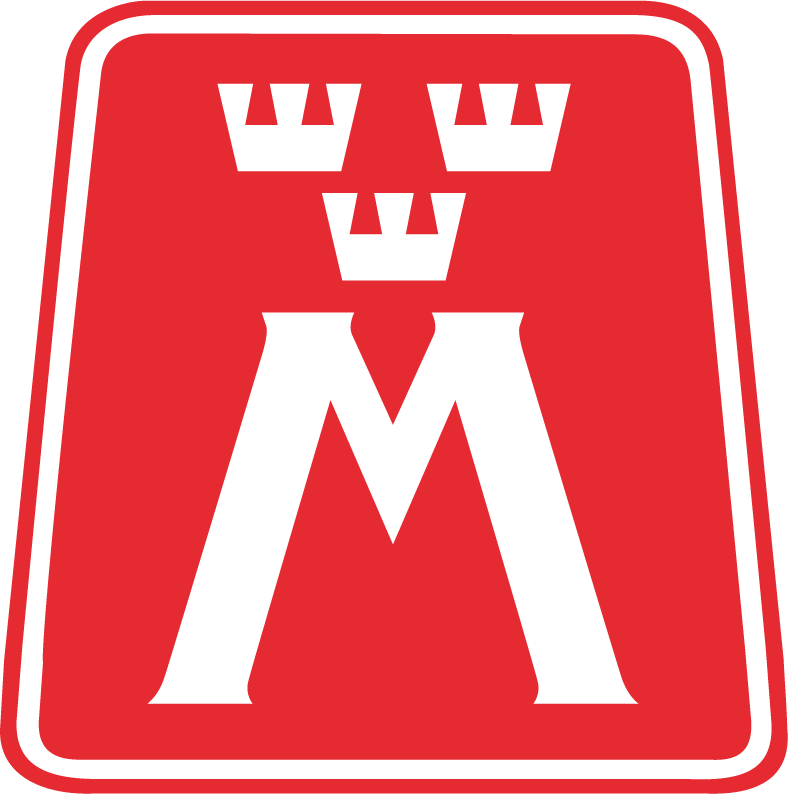
- Logotype with the organization's symbol
- Formation: 26 February 1922
- Headquarters: Stockholm, Sweden
- Official language: Swedish
- chairman: Jan Sandberg
- Website: https://msverige.se/

Riksförbundet M Sverige (M Sverige), formerly Motormännens riksförbund (The Swedish Automobile Association) is an organization for motor vehicle owners in Sweden. It was established in 1922 in Malmö as "Sveriges förenade motormän" before changing name in 1924.

A former CEO was Astrid Lindgren's husband Sture Lindgren who held the post from 1941 to 1952 and started the organization's own magazine Motor in 1943. Astrid Lindgren was also working for the Motormännens riksförbund, writing articles for the magazine, and her first books Fem automobilturer i Sverige (1939) and 25 bilturer i Sverige (1949, English: 25 automobile tours in Sweden).
