= Indonesian Motor Association =

Ikatan Motor Indonesia
- Abbreviation: IMI
- Founded: 27 April 1906; 119 years ago,1950; 76 years ago (renamed to IMI)
- Affiliation: FIA, FIM
- Headquarters: Jakarta, Indonesia
- President: Moreno Soeprapto

Official website
- imi.id

Ikatan Motor Indonesia (Indonesian Motor Association / abbreviated IMI) is the association of sports cars, motorcycles and automotive clubs in Indonesia.

== History ==
Originally founded in Semarang, Indonesia, 27 March 1906 as the Javasche Motor Club, it was later renamed into the Koningklije Het Nederlands Indische Motor Club (KNIMC). The club was then transformed into the Indonesische KNIMC Motor Club after obtaining sovereignty from the Kingdom of the Netherlands under the Government of the Republic of Indonesia (Department of Transportation). The club currently goes under the name of Ikatan Motor Indonesia (IMI) - renamed as such in 1950, with headquarters in the Right Wing of the Tennis Stadium, Jalan Pintu I Senayan in Jakarta.

The club is a long-standing member of the Federation Internationale de Motocyclisme (FIM) and the Fédération Internationale de l'Automobile (FIA), the world bodies for 2, 3 and 4 wheeler motor sports respectively.
