= Touring & Automobile Club of the Islamic Republic of Iran =

Touring and Automobile Club of the Islamic Republic of Iran (TACI)
- Abbreviation: TACI
- Formation: 1935
- Location: Tehran, Iran
- Region served: Republic of Iran
- Official language: Persian; English
- President: Mohammad Hossein Soufi
- Parent organization: Ministry of Cultural Heritage, Tourism and Handicrafts (MCTH)
- Affiliations: FIA, AIT, FIA Foundation, UNWTO
- Staff: 160
- Website: www.taci.ir//

The Touring and Automobile Club of the Islamic Republic of Iran (TACI) is a non-profit organization that performs state-level administrative tasks under the supervision of the Ministry of Cultural Heritage, Tourism and Handicrafts. The Club's services include operating the national travel call center, dispatching roadside motorist assistance, and facilitating vehicular travel for tourists in Iran and Iranians going abroad, including issuing International Driving Permits (IDPs).

== History ==
TACI was established in 1935 following the approval of the National Assembly of Iran on December 24, 1934. TACI continued its establishment bypassing the official and registration stages in 1938. Iran's membership in the Fédération Internationale de l'Automobile (FIA) was registered in the name of the Tourism and Automobile Club in 1952.

After the Islamic Revolution, with the approval of the bill in the Supreme Council of the Revolution on November 24, 1979, the Imperial Touring Club and Automobile Club was renamed to the Touring and Automobile Club of the Islamic Republic of Iran. During the years 1983 to 1993, TACI became a subset of the Cultural Heritage, Handcrafts and Tourism Organization, becoming separated from the Ministry of Culture and Islamic Guidance. In 2019, the Cultural Heritage, Handcrafts, and Tourism Organization was converted into the Ministry of Cultural Heritage, Tourism and Handicrafts.

TACI was appointed as the exclusive organization responsible for issuing International Driving Permits (IDPs), issuing and guaranteeing Carnets de Passages in Douane (CPDs), and issuing Registration Certificates and Registration Number Plates for Iranians who travel abroad with their own vehicles.

TACI’s Roadside Assistance Services were established in 1968 with the aim of providing relief services for Iranian and foreign tourists. Over time, TACI developed its activities by providing relief services through its provincial representatives. TACI’s roadside assistance rescuers were deployed in the cities and roads throughout the county.

== CEOs ==
CEO	Management Period	
CEO	From	To
Mohammad Hossein Soufi	October, 2021	Present
Hossein Arbabi	November, 2019	October, 2021
Ramin Afshari	October, 2017	November, 2019
Morteza Haji	January, 2017	October, 2017
Ebrahim Rezaei Babadi	December, 2015	January, 2017
Abolghasem Iraji	December, 2013	December, 2015
Hamidreza Safi Khani	April, 2013	December, 2013
Majid Abolfathi	August, 2012	April, 2013
Hossein Jafari Daranjani	January, 2012	August, 2012
Hamed Dehghanan	June, 2011	January, 2012
Fariborz Ensafi	June, 2010	June, 2011
Ali Asghar Parhizkar	June, 2009	June, 2010
Seyed Mohammadreza Taghizadeh	September, 2007	June, 2009
Hossein Moein Zad	May, 2007	September, 2007
Hojjat Asadi	October, 2006	May, 2007
Hamid Mohammadi	December, 2002	October, 2006
Saeed Owhadi	October, 1996	December, 2002
Mohammad Sadegh Farhadian	October, 1995	October, 1996
Mohammad Ashghari	May, 1995	October, 1995
Mohammad Ali Yavari	January, 1983	May, 1995
Ghias-odin Alaie	February, 1982	January, 1983
Mir Abdolhamid Adabi	January 1980	February, 1982
Ahmad Matin-Daftari	December, 1969	January, 1980
Mohammad Ali Bouzari	December, 1969	January, 1980
Abbas Masoudi	December, 1969	January, 1980
Mahmoud Djam	January, 1936	December, 1969

== Subsidiaries ==
- Iranian Educational Institute
- Aras Travel Agency
- Zagros Investment and Tourism Institute
- Zagros International Hotel
