= Korea Automobile Association =

- 한국자동차협회
- Abbreviation: KAA
- Formation: 17 September 1969; 56 years ago
- Location: Seongdong District, Seoul, South Korea

The Korea Automobile Association (Korean: 한국자동차협회) is an automobile association formed in 1969. Their purpose is to represent automobile drivers (consumers) and promote their rights and interests in South Korea. It is located in D-dong (Yongdap-dong), No. B, 70, Auto Market 1-gil, Seongdong District, Seoul.
