= Royal Automobile Club of Western Australia =

Motoring organisation in Australia

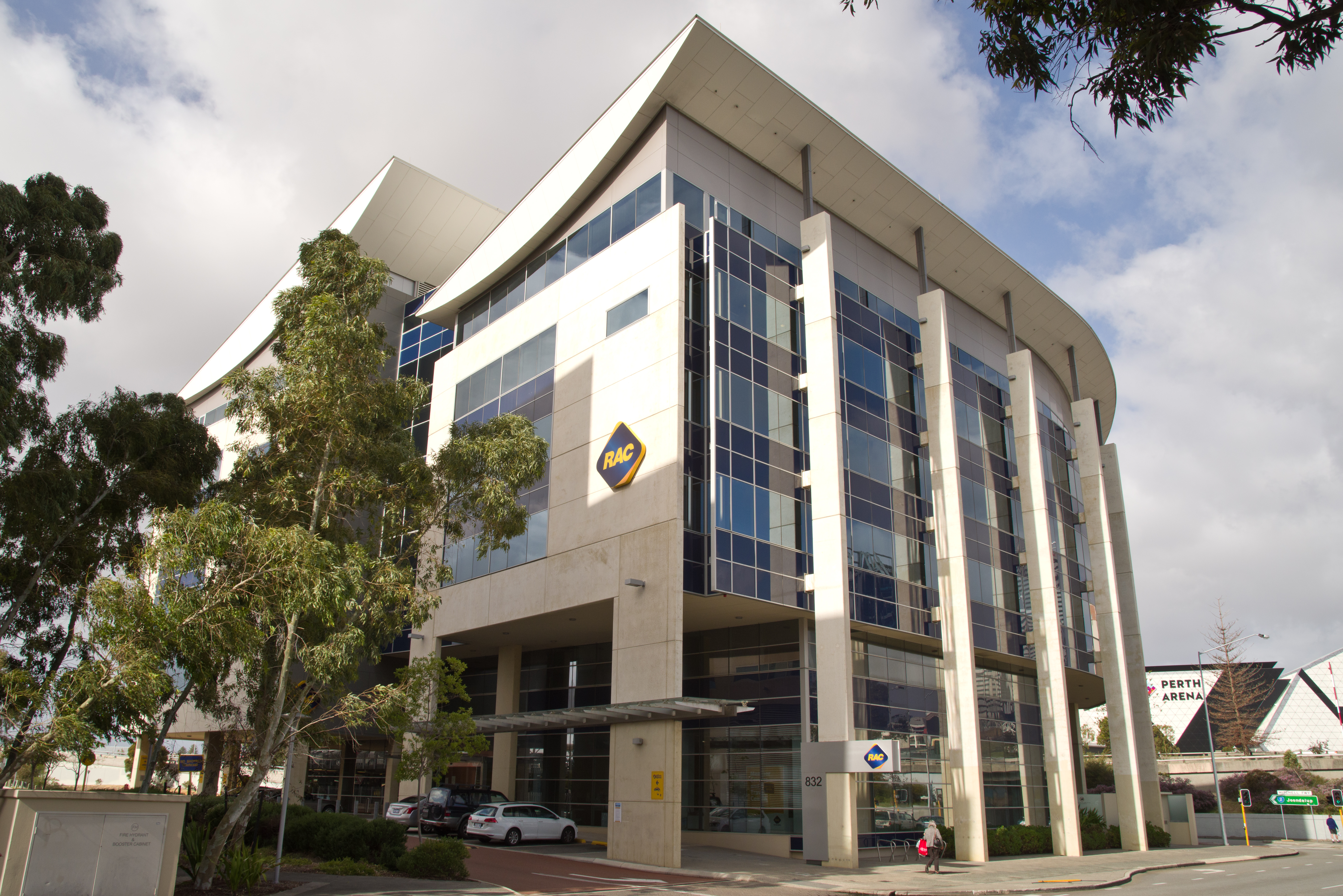
- Headquarters in Wellington Street, Perth in October 2016
- Formation: 1 July 1905
- Headquarters: Wellington Street, West Perth, Western Australia
- Members: 1.3 million (2025)
- President: John Driscoll
- Group Chief Executive Officer: Robert Slocombe
- Revenue: $1.5 billion (2025)
- Website: www.rac.com.au
- Formerly called: Automobile Club of Western Australia (1905-1922)

The Royal Automobile Club of Western Australia (RAC) is a motoring club and mutual organisation, offering motoring services and advice, insurance, travel services, finance, driver training and exclusive benefits for their members. As an independent voice for road users in Western Australia, the RAC is concerned with all aspects of road and community safety.

== History ==
The Automobile Club of Western Australia was founded on 1 July 1905 with a gathering outside Government House. It started signposting roads, a function it would continue to perform until 1975, and creating maps of the state for motorists and encouraged local authorities to improve road surfaces and push for lower city-driving speeds.

In 1922, it is given Royal Patronage, becoming the Royal Automobile Club of Western Australia. In 1926 a roadside assistance service was launched in Perth. In 1947, the RAC entered the insurance market.

In May 2025, the RAC announced it proposed to sell the manufacturing components of its insurance division to the Insurance Australia Group. In December 2025 the Australian Competition & Consumer Commission opposed the takeover on the grounds that it would result in a substantial lessening of competition. The RAC stated its intention to support IAG's application under the new competition regime commencing in 2026.

== Services ==
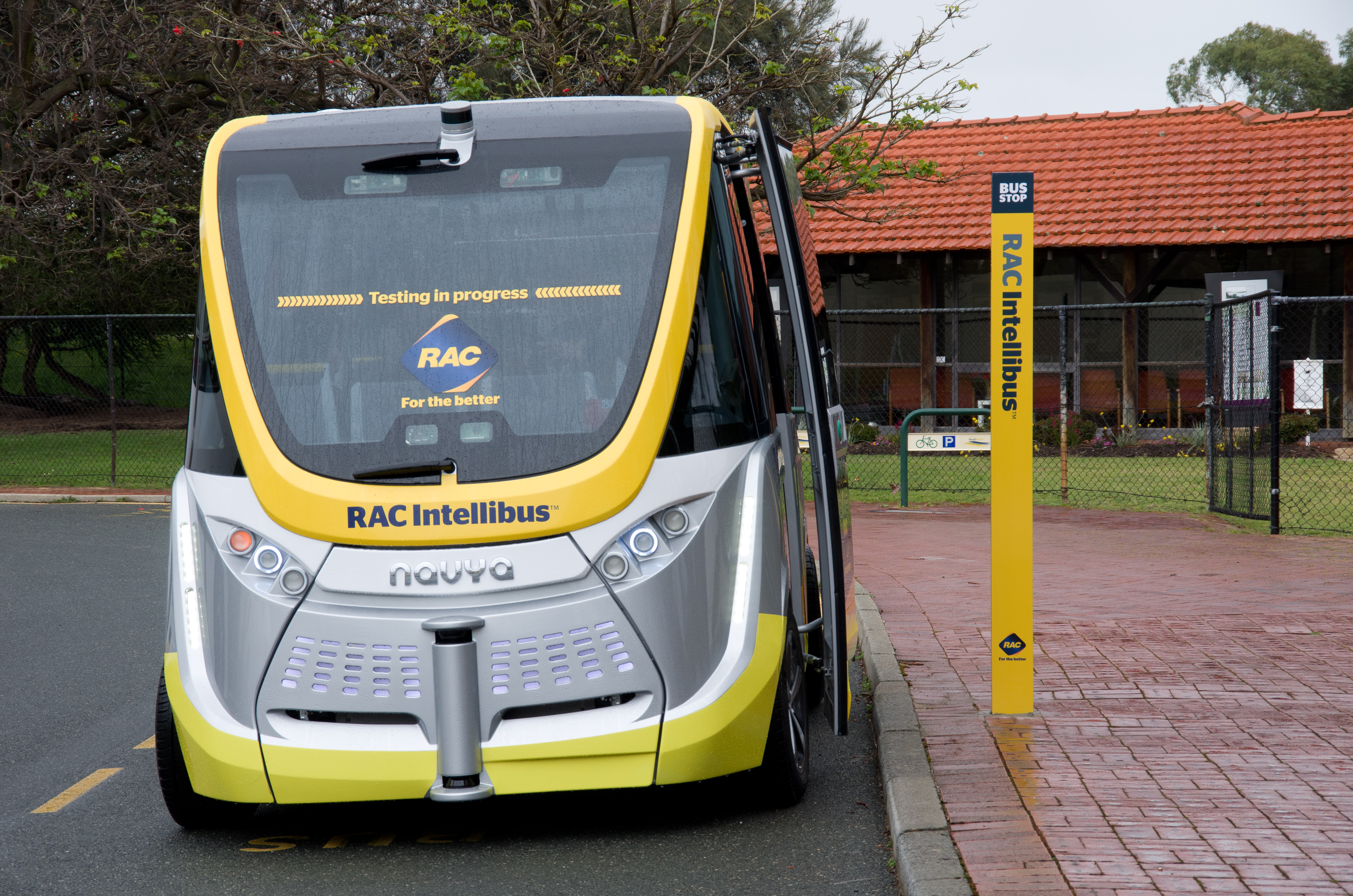
RAC Intellibus trial autonomous bus in South Perth in September 2016

- Roadside assistance – breakdown assistance
- Finance – car, personal and travel loans
- Insurance – home, contents, car, motorcycle, caravan, boat, landlords, renters
- Home security – home security systems
- Tourism and travel – escorted and unescorted tours, accommodation bookings
- Auto services – vehicle repair and service centres
- Member service centres – a network of retail outlets providing RAC Travel products and other merchandise
- Parks and resorts – a network of holiday resorts (chalets, caravan and camping sites) in Western Australia
- Retirement living - under the St Ives Brand in Western Australia
- Innovation - RAC owns BetterLabs, comprising a corporate venture capital fund and a venture studios business

== Advocacy ==
The RAC is an important advocate for its members and the WA community on issues such as road and vehicle safety, fuel pricing, road funding, transport planning, energy and the environment.

== Corporate ==
The RAC headquarters is located at 832 Wellington Street, West Perth. A number of floor paving tiles recognise the contribution of notable Western Australians to the RAC and motoring in Western Australia.

== Publications ==
From 1951 until 2007, Road Patrol was the RAC's in-house magazine. It was succeeded by Horizons.

== Sponsorships ==
Since 2003, the RAC have sponsored WA's only 24/7 emergency rescue helicopter service.

In September 2018, the RAC took over the naming rights for the Perth Arena.

RAC is also the "Official Road Safety Partner" for the Fremantle Football Club.
