= Fédération Internationale des Véhicules Anciens =

International federation of ancient vehicles

- Abbreviation: FIVA
- Established: 1966
- Type: non-profit federative club / society / advocacy group
- Location: Turin, Italy
- Official language: English, French
- President: Tiddo Bresters (NL)
- Board of directors: the President, and 8 (sr) Vice-Presidents, and several directors for specific tasks
- Affiliations: Glasurit Coatings; MOTUL Lubricants; Pirelli Tyres; Eucon GmbH Vehicle Data
- Website: www.fiva.org

The Fédération International des Véhicules Anciens or FIVA (English: international federation of ancient vehicles) is the worldwide federative association of historic automobile clubs, be they for veteran, vintage, pre- or post-war classic cars, at least thirty years old.
FIVA statutes define it as: "a non-profit international association of clubs, federations and other organisations concerned with the preservation, restoration, use and culture of mechanically propelled road vehicles."

FIVA member clubs represent more than 2.5 million oldtimer enthusiasts in more than 70 countries, through more than 85 member organizations.

The FIVA's executive board bestows so-called ANF-Status (Autorité Nationale de la FIVA), or national FIVA authoritative status, upon one member organization per country.

In 2013 all 61 national member organizations of FIVA ratified and enacted the so-called "Turin Charter", set forth by The International Committee for the Conservation of the Industrial Heritage (TICCIH) "to preserve and safeguard the history of vehicles including their engineering, form, functions and documented histories and their many and diverse relationships with society and social environments, .."

== Founding and objectives ==
The “Fédération Internationale des Véhicules Anciens” was founded in 1966, when several historic vehicle associations and classic car clubs in a number of different countries felt a need for a worldwide body to promote and direct the interests of a historic vehicle movement internationally.

FIVA's primary objective is to: "encourage the safe use of self-propelled, mechanical vehicles, more than thirty years old, on the roads for the benefit of both their owners, dedicated enthusiasts and the general public."

The FIVA's three main goals and objectives include:

- Protecting the responsible use of historic vehicles, through policies and legislation, specific supportive actions relations with authorities
- Preserving historic vehicles, related artifacts and records, including research and cataloguing
- Promoting historic vehicle culture, including international events, forums, and seminars

== Methods, activities, and collaborations ==
FIVA's Culture Commission works to achieve recognition of historic vehicles and related objects, as culturally significant artifacts, by legal and political authorities and other stakeholders. FIVA's Events Commission collaborated with the European Commission to create a freely downloadable Driver's Code for general guidance of historic vehicle users, and also has devised a code for the safe promotion of rallies or mildly competitive events. The Technical Commission works to support the preservation of as many historic vehicles as possible, by cataloguing them with FIVA's Vehicle ID-card. FIVA has forged links with UNESCO and has persuaded the European Commission to accept that historic vehicles represent an important part of industrial heritage. FIVA has further linked up with the Fédération Internationale de l'Automobile (FIA), to promote the interest of historic cars in more sporting arenas, and with the Fédération Internationale de Motocyclisme (FIM), to help achieve similar objectives for motorcycles. FIVA's Legislation Commission works to address legislation that (threatens to) limit(s) the continued use of historic vehicles. Sofar this has primarily been concentrated on European countries and the European Union, but legislation pressures on motor transport are ever increasing generally.

== Commissions ==
FIVA has Ambassadors, and dedicated commissions working on its (members') national and international goals:

- Legislation Commission
- Culture Commission
- Technical Commission
- Trade, Skill & Youth Commission - Integrated since 2018 in the culture commission
- Events Commission
- Motorcycle Commission
- Utilitarian Commission

== Definitions and classifications ==
According to FIVA and its Charter of Turin, a historic vehicle is "a mechanically propelled road vehicle:

- which is at least 30 years old,
- which is preserved and maintained in a historically correct condition,
- which is not used as a means of daily transport
- and which is, therefore, a part of our technical and cultural heritage."

Vehicle classifications

Class	Time built	Category
A	up to 31 December 1904	Ancestor
B	between 1 January 1905 and 31 December 1918	Veteran
C	between 1 January 1919 and 31 December 1930	Vintage
D	between 1 January 1931 and 31 December 1945	Post Vintage
E	between 1 January 1946 and 31 December 1960	Post War
F	between 1 January 1961 and 31 December 1970	
G	built on or after 1 January 1971 and up to a date 30 years before the first day of the current year	
