= Automobile Association of Kenya =

The Automobile Association of Kenya, abbreviated as AA Kenya, is an independent motoring association that provides services to its members such as roadside assistance, driver training, motor vehicle valuation and car insurance brokerage. AA Kenya is also an active voice in road safety related matters within Kenya and the region.
