= Royal Automobile Club of Tasmania =

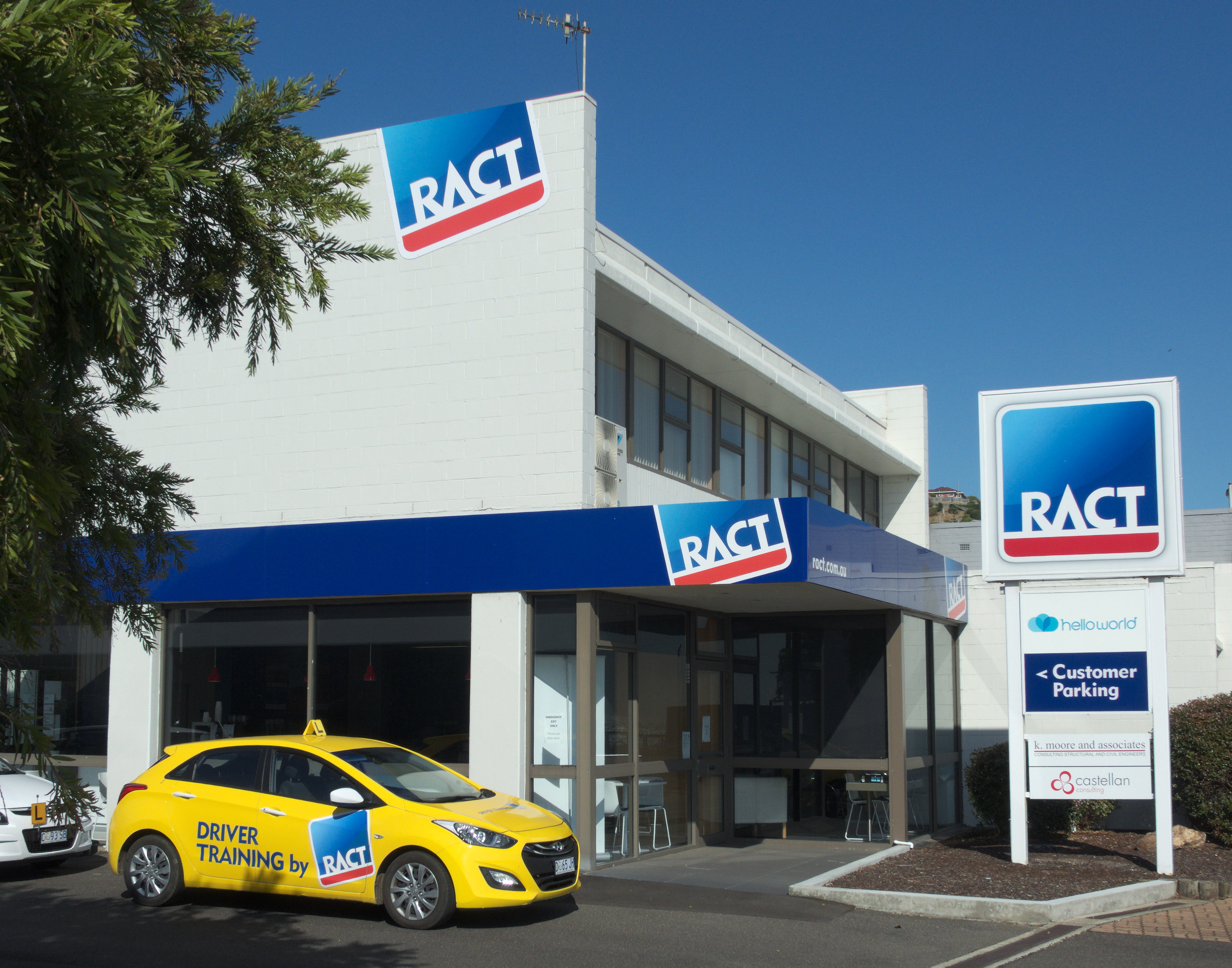
- RACT office in Burnie.
- Abbreviation: RACT
- Established: 1923; 103 years ago
- Founders: R. J. Shield; Col. A. P. Crisp
- Founded at: Hobart, Tasmania
- Headquarters: 179–191 Murray Street, Hobart, Tasmania, 7000
- President: Alison Flakemore
- Website: www.ract.com.au

The Royal Automobile Club of Tasmania (RACT) is a motoring club in Tasmania, Australia. The organisation was established as the Royal Autocar Club of Tasmania in 1923 by R. J. Shield and Col. A. P. Crisp. The club now has over 200,000 members and is a member of the Australian Automobile Association. It provides services such as roadside assistance, vehicle, home and contents insurance, personal and car loans, driver's education and tourism.

In addition to consumer services, the club also engages in consumer advocacy, particularly in regard to petrol prices, which are both historically and recently higher than prices in other parts of Australia.

== Leadership ==
President of the Royal Automobile Club of Tasmania
- Incumbent; Alison J. Flakemore since 2021

=== Past Presidents ===
President	Term start	Term end	Ref
Weller Arnold	1926	After 1941	
Stuart E. Slade		13 November 2013	
Peter J. Joyce	13 November 2013	2016	
Kathryn A. Westwood	2016	2021	
