= Touring Club Suisse =

Non-profit association

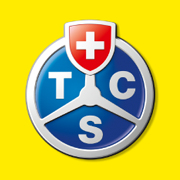
- Founded: 1 September 1896
- Fate: Representing the interests and providing services in the area of mobility
- Headquarters: Vernier, Switzerland
- Key people: Peter Goetschi (President); Jürg Wittwer (General Director)
- Members: 1.6 million (2023)

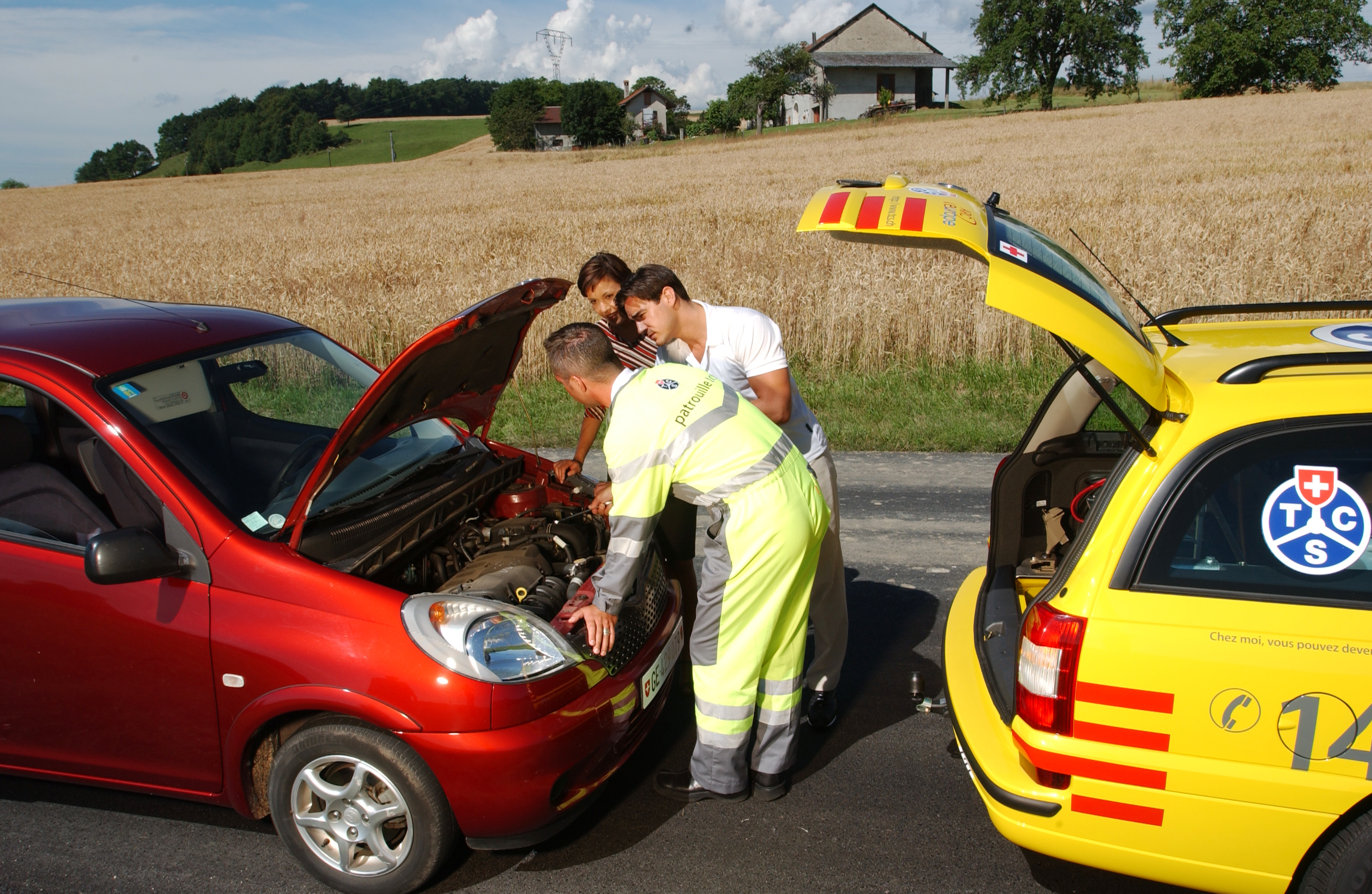
A TCS patrol vehicle at a roadside assistance call

Touring Club Suisse (TCS) is the largest mobility club in Switzerland and a non-profit association. It has roughly 1,6 million members and 1900 employees.

== History ==
TCS was established in Geneva on September 1, 1896, by a group of 205 cyclists, primarily to promote bicycle tourism.

== Organisation and Structure ==
The TCS is a non-profit organisation. According to its statutes, its purpose is to protect the rights and interests of its members in road traffic and in the area of mobility in general. It promotes their touristic interests. In doing so, it takes due account of the overall interests. TCS provides services for its members in Switzerland and abroad in the areas of assistance, protection, counselling, safety, environment and information, as well as in the field of tourism and leisure. The TCS takes and supports measures within the framework of its objectives, in particular to improve road safety.

Structurally, the TCS comprises 23 regional sections along with a central Club. Each section contributes a representative to the Board of Directors, which oversees the organization's broader activities. The management of the Central Club's day-to-day operations is the responsibility of an appointed director. The Delegate Assembly, representing the entire membership of the TCS, functions as its highest decision-making body.

== Activities ==
TCS provides various services to its members, including insurance, road assistance, and driving courses. Additionally, the organization operates a number of campgrounds across Switzerland. TCS is also involved in conducting crash tests for mobility-related objects and participates in political lobbying on issues pertaining to mobility.

The TCS is primarily known in Switzerland for its breakdown service (Patrouille).

It tests various products and provides advice on all aspects of mobility, such as child seats, car tyres, bicycle helmets, navigation devices and electromobility.

TCS runs various portals for public use: tyre comparison portal, child seat comparison portal and the mountain pass portal. The TCS petrol price radar, which was created at the end of 2022, became very well known. The tool offers users a high level of transparency regarding fuel prices in Switzerland. The online comparison service Comparis also adopted the radar. National politics subsequently decided to dispense with an originally planned official solution. The TCS is therefore the only provider in this area.

The club is committed to road safety by developing teaching materials, awareness-raising and prevention campaigns, testing mobility infrastructures and advising authorities. It participates in national campaigns financed by the federal road safety fund. The TCS distributes around 110,000 fluorescent belts and 84,000 fluorescent waistcoats to children every year.

ETI is a year-round travel insurance policy. The ETI centre organises around 57,000 assistance services per year, including 3,200 medical examinations and over 1,200 repatriations.

Individual sections of the TCS also offer officially recognised motor vehicle inspections, which correspond to those of the cantonal road traffic offices.

TCS is invited by federal and cantonal authorities to participate in consultations in the area of mobility and road safety.

Other key products include legal protection, credit cards, vehicle insurance, bicycle insurance and emergency insurance. The club has 22 technical centres, 33 campsites, 10 driving training centres and 10 logistics bases for rescue services and ambulance transport operated by TCS Swiss Ambulance Rescue. TCS members also benefit from advantages with other Swiss providers of services and products (TCS Benefits).

10 times a year, members receive the club magazine "touring" free of charge, which is published in German, French and Italian.

TCS has been a member of the International Automobile Federation (FIA) since 1998 and is a co-signatory of the Electric Mobility Roadmap 2025.

== Literature ==
- François Antoniazzi, Der Touring Club Schweiz im Spiegel von 100 Ereignissen 1896–1996, TCS Publishing, Geneva, 1996.
- Joseph Britschgi, Manuel d'enseignement de la circulation, TCS Publishing, Geneva, 1946.
