= Roadside assistance =

Organisation providing breakdown coverage

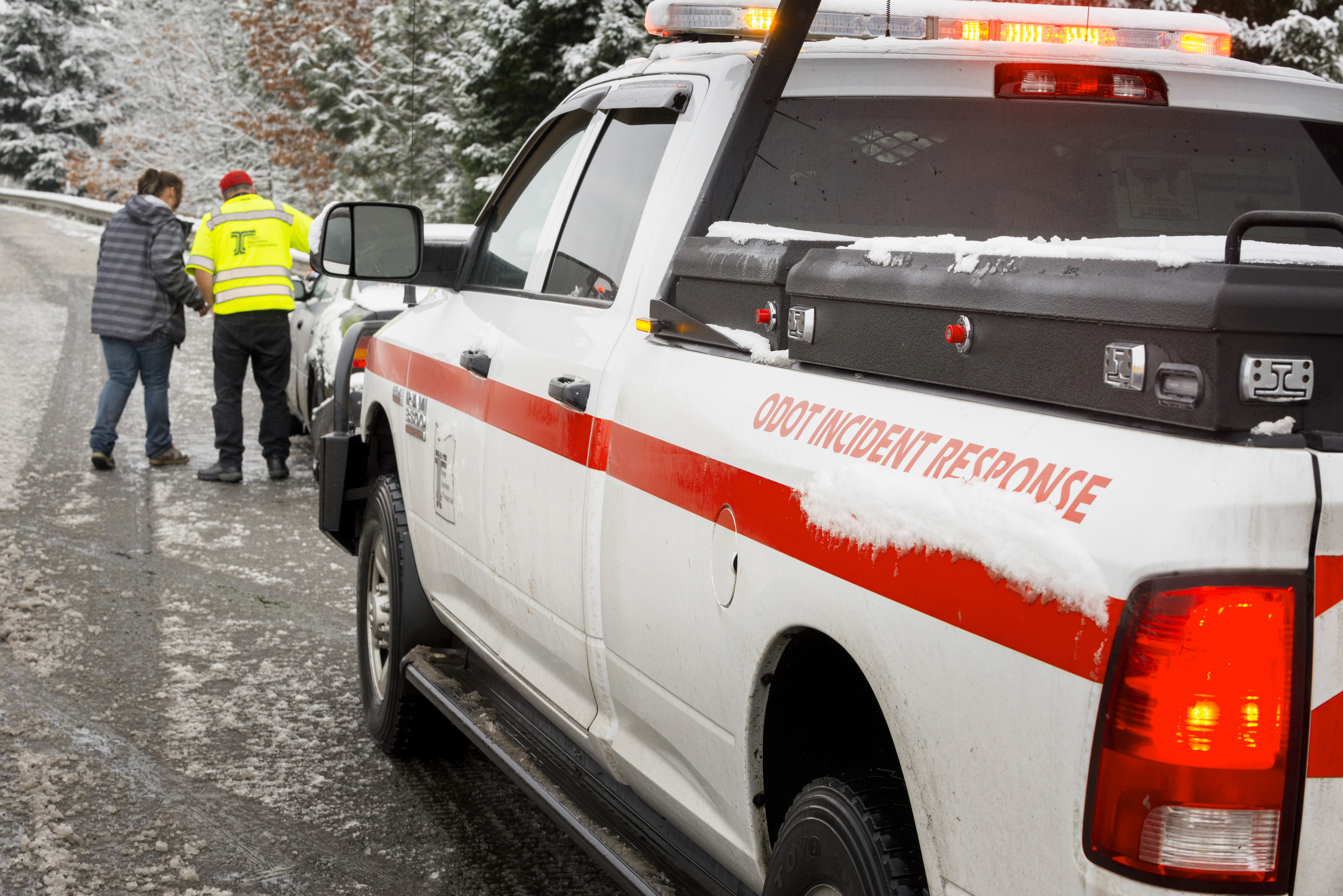
An Oregon Department of Transportation roadside assistance employee assisting a motorist

Roadside assistance, also known as breakdown coverage, is a service that assists motorists, motorcyclists, or bicyclists whose vehicles have suffered a mechanical failure that either cannot be resolved by the motorist, or has prevented them from reasonably or effectively transporting the vehicle to an automobile repair shop. Roadside assistance employees respond to calls for service to inspect the vehicle and attempt to render appropriate repairs. Roadside assistance may be provided by departments of transportation, automobile associations, vehicle insurance providers, or dedicated roadside assistance organizations.

== History ==
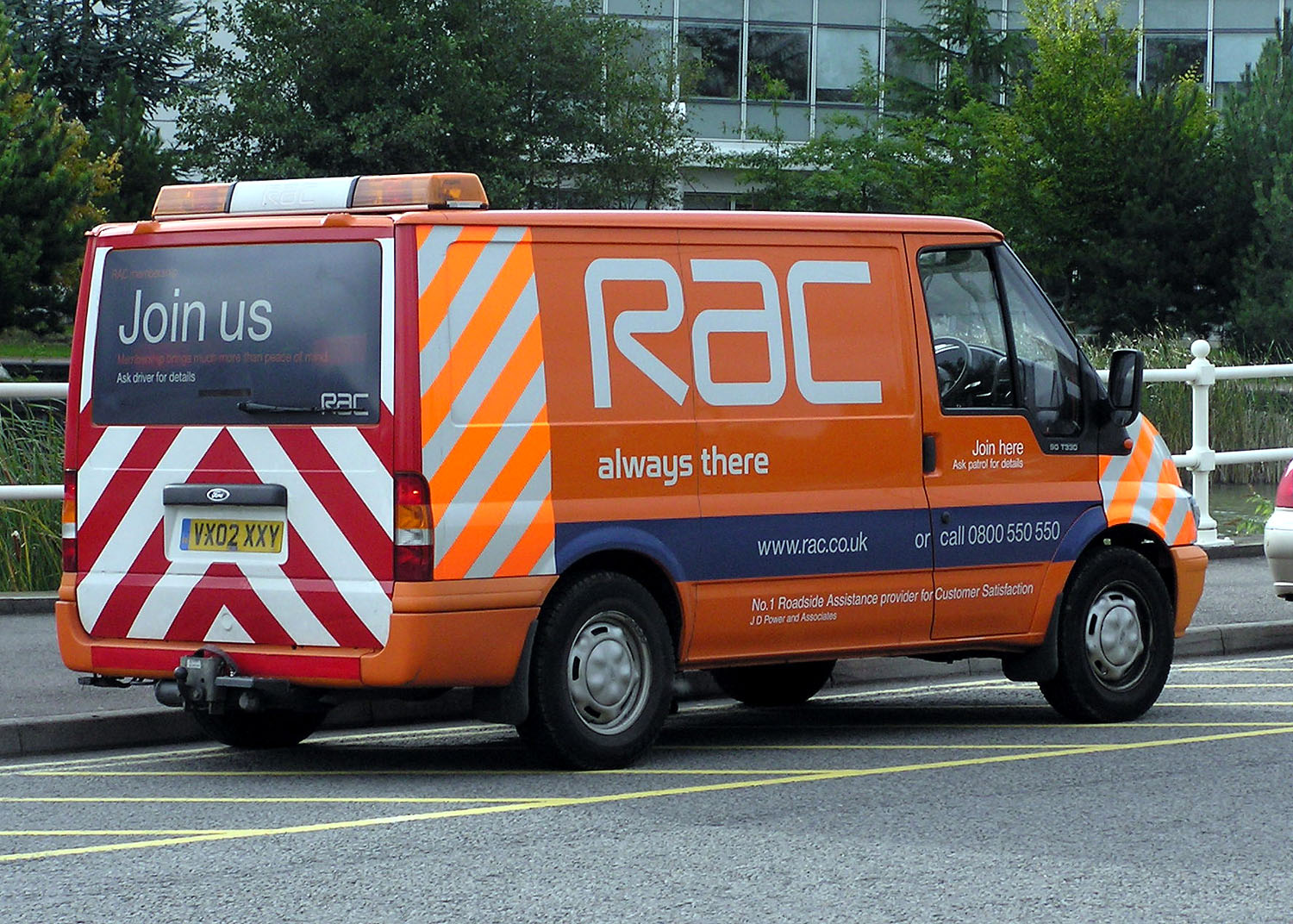
United Kingdom RAC roadside assistance van

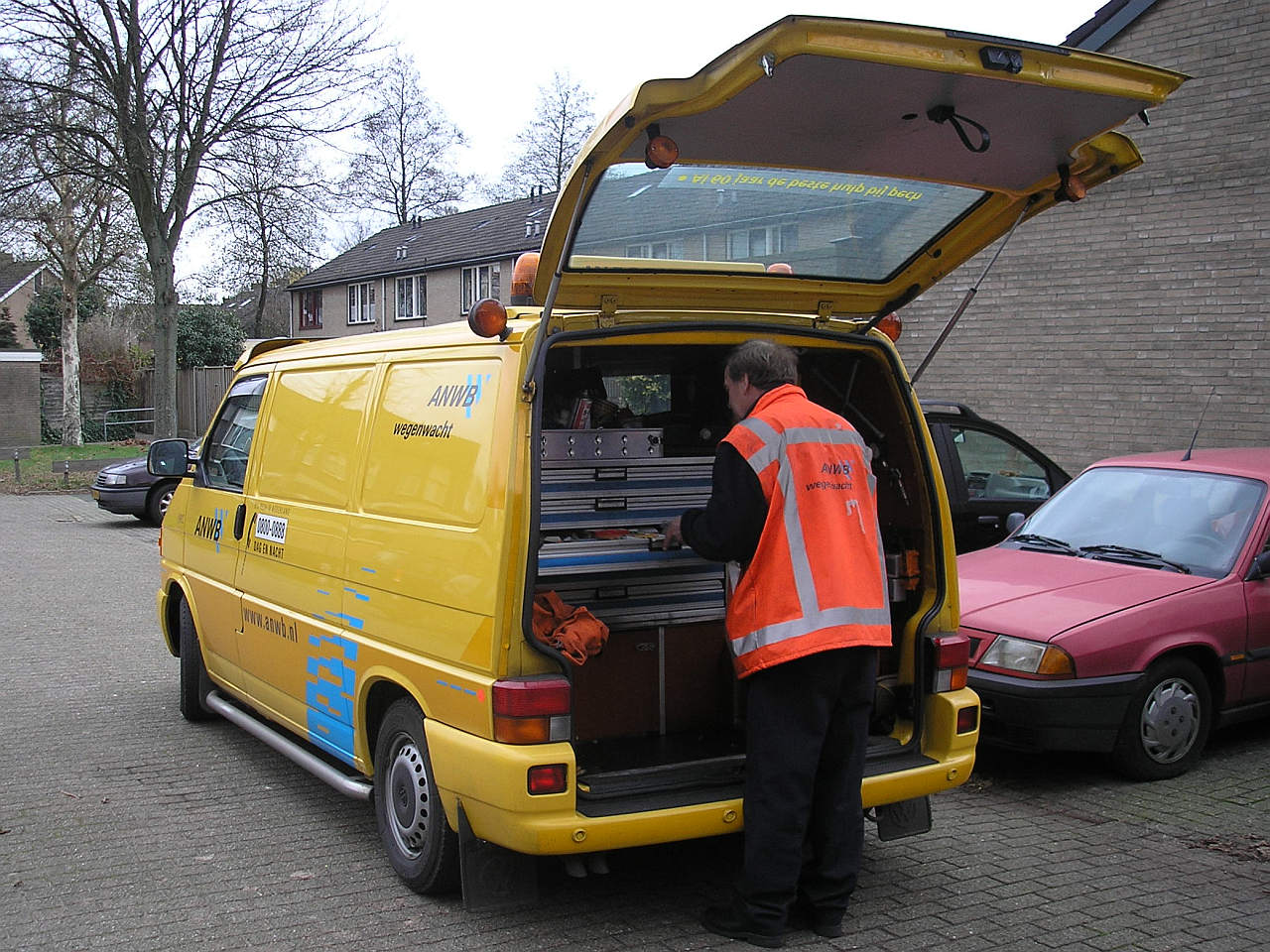
Dutch roadside assistance van of the ANWB

Early motorists were often capable of carrying out minor repairs themselves, but as automobiles became more complicated, it became more difficult to carry out successfully. Some early local motoring clubs tried to support their members by encouraging them to help each other. A rotation of members who would help other members was kept, and in some cases, cash was put aside to hire a tow truck if needed.

In the UK, RAC (a former associate of the Royal Automobile Club) and The Automobile Association (AA) (formed in 1905) offer repair services to their members on the spot, tow to a local garage or the driver's home if nearby (a limit of 20 miles commonly) and in some cases provide onward journey services such as hire vehicles.

The Allgemeiner Deutscher Automobil-Club in Germany began to offer a similar service in 1927. In the Netherlands, a Wegenwacht (road watch) of the Royal Dutch Touring Club (ANWB) started operating only in 1946, because World War II intervened.

In the U.S., the American Automobile Association started the first roadside assistance service in April 1915, when five motorcyclists working for the Automobile Club of St. Louis founded the “First Aid Corps.” The group drove through the city's streets on Sundays looking for stranded motorists, making minor engine and tire repairs for free, for members and nonmembers alike. They helped 24 motorists on that first Sunday and 171 by the end of the first month.

Many of these associations are membership-based clubs and provide services to assist members through the use of fleet assistance vehicles. In the case of the UK AA, these were traditionally motorcycle-mounted prior to the introduction of vans.

When communication technology and availability made it practical, a network of emergency phone boxes, placed at intervals by the roadside, was introduced in some countries. In recent years, the widespread ownership of mobile phones has supplanted the need for an emergency phone network. Mobile technology has also led to the development of free applications (apps). Mobile technology enabled drivers to call for roadside assistance using mobile apps such as Urgent.ly Roadside Assistance app (Urgent.ly) introduced in 2014 in the United States.

== Provision of service ==
In some areas, especially in Europe, there is a government-sponsored or sanctioned automobile membership association, and the service may be in the form of an insurance policy with premiums, instead of a member subscription fee.

Services may also be available as part of the service of a vehicle insurance company, or other companies whose primary business is to offer such assistance, such as AAA in America, the NRMA in Australia or the AA in the UK.

Roadside assistance services remain an important part of Australia's transport network. During the 2023–24 financial year, RACQ responded to more than 740,000 roadside assistance callouts and successfully repaired 91% of vehicles at the roadside.

Some automobile manufacturers also offer roadside assistance for their customers, sometimes for free for some period after the purchase of a new vehicle.

== Assistance ==
Breakdown coverage may include jump-starting an automobile, diagnosing and repairing the problem that caused the breakdown, towing a vehicle, helping to change a flat tire, providing a small amount of fuel when a vehicle runs out of it, pulling out a vehicle that is stuck in snow or helping people who are locked out of their cars. Cold climates significantly increase the demand for roadside assistance, as snow, ice, and reduced visibility create additional hazards for drivers.

== See also ==
- Breakdown (vehicle)
- Car safety
- Vehicle recovery
