= Road Safety Foundation =

United Kingdom charity

The Road Safety Foundation
- Founded: 31 October 1986
- Founder: The Automobile Association
- Type: Registered Charity
- Purpose: Road Safety Research
- Location: Basingstoke, England
- Region served: UK, Republic of Ireland
- Product: EuroRAP
- Method: EuroRAP, Campaign for Safe Road Design, European Campaign for Safe Road Design
- Key people: Lord Dubs, Chairman
- Website: roadsafetyfoundation.org

The Road Safety Foundation is a United Kingdom charity which carries out and procures research into safe road design and road safety. The Foundation is responsible for the European Road Assessment Program (EuroRAP) in the UK and Ireland.

== History ==
The Foundation was created in 1986 as the AA Foundation for Road Safety Research by the AA, while it was still a member-owned institution. The charity became the Road Safety Foundation following the sale of the AA by Centrica to CVC and Permira.

== Aims ==
Today the Foundation's aims are:

- the carrying out of research into all factors of the safe use of roads by all classes of user
- the promotion of advice and knowledge on the safe use of roads to all users
- to develop ideas and programmes designed to improve road safety including projects to educate young children on the safe use of the road
- to provide the transportation industry with access to a library of research materials, as well as policy documentations and relevant publications

== Governance ==
The Foundation is governed by a Council of Management led by Lord Alf Dubs and includes representation from the Freight Transport Association, FIA Foundation for the Automobile and Society, and International Road Assessment Programme (IRAP).

In addition to his role in the Foundation, Lord Dubs, previously a Labour Member of Parliament and Parliamentary Under-Secretary of State in the Northern Ireland Office, is an active member of the House of Lords. In January 2008 Lord Dubs spoke of his interest in Road Safety and the Foundation in a debate on road safety.

== Research ==
The Foundation has a legacy of research going back to its inception in the mid-1980s. Research covers a wide range of road safety related subjects including the causes of accidents in young pedestrians, risk and safety in the older driver and a review of tyres and road surfaces. Since 2003 the work of the Foundation has focused on EuroRAP in the UK and in 2008 the Campaign for Safe Road Design.

=== EuroRAP in the UK ===
The Foundation is the Active Member and licence holder for the European Road Assessment Programme (EuroRAP) in Britain and Ireland. The Foundation regularly issues the list of safest and most dangerous roads in Britain and Ireland.

In 2008 the Foundation released its latest results for Britain, naming the A537 Macclesfield to Buxton road as the most dangerous road in Britain. The results also featured in an edition of television programme Police Camera Action!.

=== Ireland ===
In May 2008 the Foundation released the latest Risk Rating results for Ireland, reporting that the Ireland network no longer featured any roads in the highest risk banding (Black: High Risk). In the Republic of Ireland, the N53 was identified as a priority for action to improve road safety, while in Northern Ireland the A2 was prioritised. The 2008 Ireland report also published the results of the first Star Rating Assessment of Ireland's roads which showed a clear split in terms of safety design between the historic non-designed single carriageway roads with poor safety provision, and the newer motorways and dual carriageways which achieved a very high safety rating.

== Campaigning for Safe Road Design ==
The Campaign for Safe Road Design is a partnership between 13 major road safety stakeholders in the United Kingdom that is calling for the UK Government to invest in a safe road infrastructure which could cut deaths on British roads by 33%. The Road Safety Foundation is the lead partner in the campaign.

Following the success of the campaign, having influenced the UK Department for Transport to support the increase of EuroRAP risk rate mapping to the wider road network in the UK, EuroRAP has organized a European Campaign for Safe Road Design along the lines of the UK campaign.

The European campaign features 28 partners across Europe and aims to influence the EC to use Safe Road Infrastructure Initiatives to cut casualties by 50,000 a year for the next decade, which is the equivalent of €50 billion over the decade or 0.5% of GDP. The Road Safety Foundation is the campaign's partner in the UK.

== See also ==
- Road safety
