= Denver's Mobility Action Plan =

Denver's Mobility Action Plan is a 2017 program designed to revitalize and revolutionize Denver’s transportation systems and options for its citizens. Signed by Mayor Michael Hancock, the plan has four main strategic goals, which focus on choice, safety, climate and health, and accessibility. The plan has numerous short-run and long-run goals, meaning the city may be utilizing this plan through around 2050.

== Goals ==
=== Transportation ===
The first goal of the plan is to create more transportation options for people who both reside and visit the metropolitan area. This is to address the heavy traffic that has shown itself in recent years, due to the fact that Denver is the fastest growing city in the U.S. among the countries fifty biggest cities. In order to address this issue, the city aims to reduce the single-occupant vehicle usage rate to 50 percent, an intended decrease from the present rate of 73 percent. Furthermore, the plans intend on increasing the percentage of bike and pedestrian commuters up to 15 percent and transit commuters up to 15 percent.

=== Safety ===
The second goal of Denver’s plan is to increase safety, as sixty-one people were killed in Denver in 2016. Denver’s primary way to combat this issue way to achieve this is to take part in the Vision Zero campaign. Utilized by another major American metropolis’, such as Los Angeles, Chicago, Austin, New York, and numerous others, Vision Zero, “is a strategy to eliminate all traffic fatalities and severe injuries, while increasing safe, healthy, and equitable mobility for all.” The goal of zero pedestrian related casualties is hoping to be achieved by 2030.

=== Climate and health problems ===
The third goal outlined in the plan is to enact important policies that intend to fight climate and health problems associated with the current transportation problem. Denver is one of the most polluted cities in the United States, as it ranks 12th worst for Ozone pollution according to the American Lung Association. This high level of air pollution is closely associated with the high number of single-occupant vehicles, which is contributing the high rate of asthma and other respiratory illnesses, where nearly 1 in 10 citizens is affected. The goal of decreasing the severity of both climate and health problems is hoped to be realized by 2050.

=== Public transportation ===
The fourth and final main goal of the plan is one that addresses the accessibility problem for users of public transportation, especially residents of the city who live around or below the poverty line. Denver currently has around one-quarter of its population living either around or below the U.S. poverty rate, which hinders many of these people from accessing safe and reliable transportation. Through this aspect of the plan, Denver hopes to create a transportation system that can support all of the cities inhabitants, regardless of socioeconomic background.

== Budget ==
There are opponents of the plan, as general complaints refer to the cost of the plan, where the $2 billion budget has only $1.65 billion invested so far, opening up questions about where the additional $350 million in desired funds will come from. Furthermore, questions about whether Denver drivers will be able to look past the automobility paradigm and embrace other forms of transportation is one that groups are skeptical of.
