= RISM =

RISM may refer to:

- Répertoire International des Sources Musicales
- Directive 2008/96/EC on road infrastructure safety management
