= Croatian Auto Club =

Croatian automobile association

Croatian Automobile Club
- Native name: Hrvatski autoklub
- Predecessor: Prvi hrvatski automobilni klub (First Croatian Automobile Club) (1906)
- Founded: June 1, 1906; 120 years ago in Zagreb
- Members: 230800
- Website: www.hak.hr

Croatian Automobile Club (Croatian: Hrvatski autoklub or abbreviated HAK) is the main Croatian automobile association – such as American AAA or British AA. With over 227,000 members, it is one of the largest non-profit associations in Croatia. The club provides a number of services to members including technical assistance to drivers on the road, reporting on traffic and road congestion in Croatia, and administering International Driving Permits to Croatian drivers.

HAK is a member of the FIA.

== Research ==
As well as being an active automobile association, HAK also undertakes road safety research. HAK is the active member of the European Road Assessment Programme (EuroRAP) in Croatia.

== Activities ==
Campaigning for Safe Road Design

The European Campaign for Safe Road Design is a partnership between 28 major European road safety stakeholders that is calling for the EC to invest in safe road infrastructure initiatives, which could cut deaths on European roads by 33% in less than a decade. HAK is the campaign's partner in Croatia.

== See also ==
- EuroRAP
