= Vision Zero =

Multinational road traffic safety project

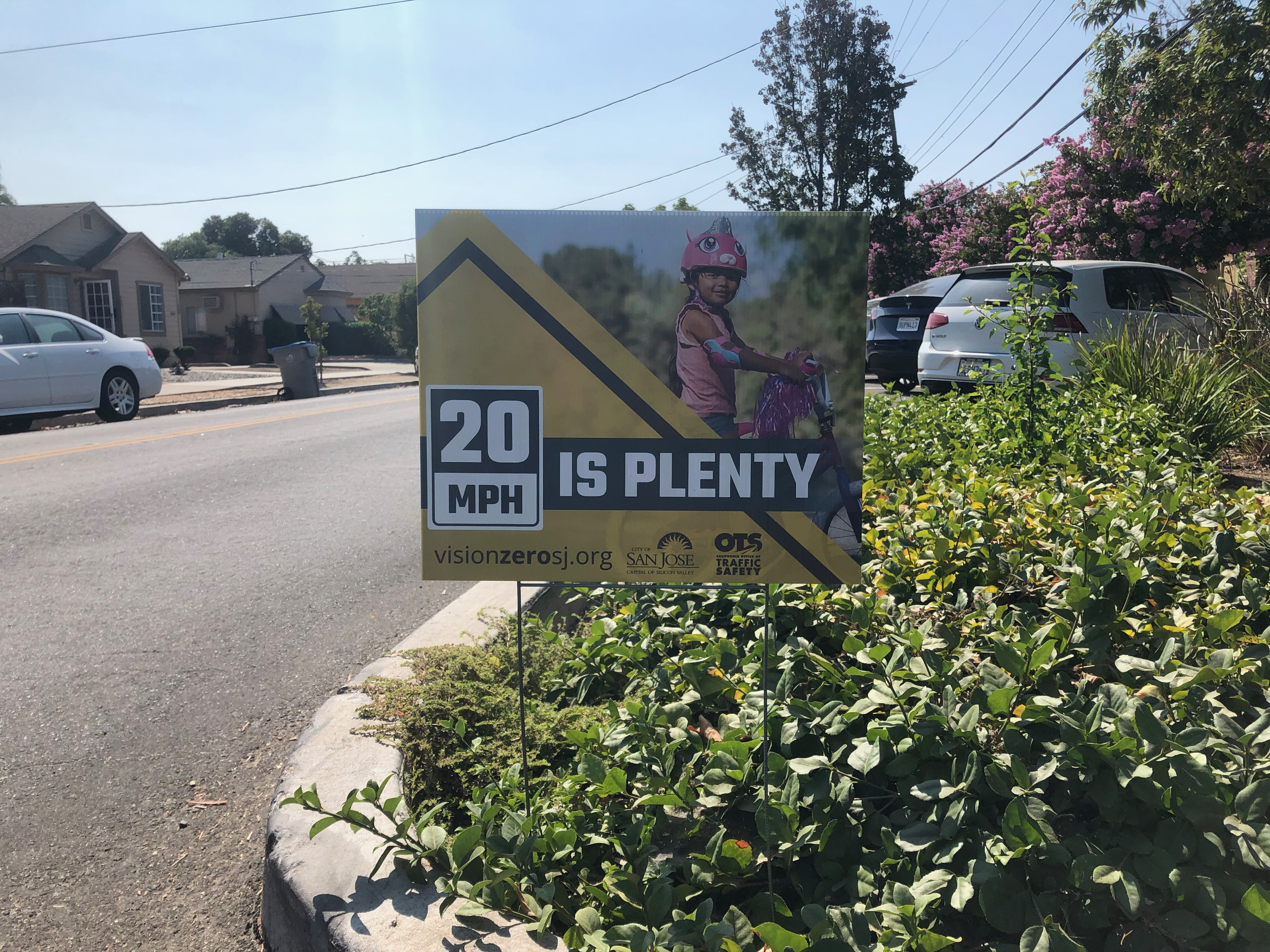
In areas with non-motorists, examples of regulatory measures are lower speed limits and more speed controls, while examples of permanent traffic calming measures are chicanes, narrower lanes or trees.

Vision Zero is a multi-national road traffic safety project that aims to achieve a roadway system with no fatalities or serious injuries involving road traffic. It started in Sweden and was approved by their parliament in October 1997. A core principle of the vision is that "Life and health can never be exchanged for other benefits within the society" rather than the more conventional comparison between costs and benefits, where a monetary value is placed on life and health, and then that value is used to decide how much money to spend on a road network towards the benefit of decreasing risk.

Vision Zero was introduced in 1995. It has been variously adopted in different countries or smaller jurisdictions, although its description varies significantly.

== Principles ==
Roads in Sweden are built with safety prioritised over speed or convenience. Low urban speed-limits, pedestrian zones and barriers that separate cars from bikes and oncoming traffic have helped. Building 1,500 kilometres (900 miles) of "2+1" roads—where each lane of traffic takes turns to use a middle lane for overtaking—is reckoned to have saved around 145 lives over the first decade of Vision Zero --Why Sweden has so few road deaths, The Economist Explains (26 February 2014)

Vision Zero is based on an underlying ethical principle that "it can never be ethically acceptable that people are killed or seriously injured when moving within the road transport system". In most road transport systems, road users bear complete responsibility for safety. Vision Zero changes this relationship by emphasizing that responsibility is shared by transportation system designers and road users.

== Speed limits ==
Vision Zero suggests the following "possible long term maximum travel speeds related to the infrastructure, given best practice in vehicle design and 100% restraint use". These speeds are based on human and automobile limits. For example, the human tolerance for a pedestrian hit by a well-designed car is approximately 30 km/h (19 mph). If a higher speed in urban areas is desired, the option is to separate pedestrian crossings from the traffic. If not, pedestrian crossings, or zones (or vehicles), must be designed to generate speeds of a maximum of 30 km/h (19 mph). Similarly, for occupants, the maximum inherent safe speed of well-designed cars can be anticipated to be a maximum of 70 km/h (43 mph) in frontal impacts, and 50 km/h (31 mph) in side impacts. Speeds over 100 km/h (62 mph) can be tolerated if the infrastructure is designed to prevent frontal and side impacts.

Possible maximum travel speeds
| Type of infrastructure and traffic | Possible travel speed (km/h) |
|---|---|
| Locations with possible conflicts between pedestrians and cars | 30 km/h (19 mph) |
| Intersections with possible side impacts between cars | 50 km/h (31 mph) |
| Roads with possible frontal impacts between cars, including rural roads | 70 km/h (43 mph) |
| Roads with no possibility of a side impact or frontal impact (only impact with the infrastructure) | 100 km/h (62 mph)+ |

"Roads with no possibility of a side impact or frontal impact" are sometimes designated as Type 1 ( motorways/freeways/Autobahns ), Type 2 ("2+2 roads") or Type 3 ("2+1 roads"). These roadways have crash barriers separating opposing traffic, limited access, grade separation and prohibitions on slower and more vulnerable road users. Undivided rural roads can be quite dangerous even with speed limits that appear low by comparison. In 2010, German rural roads, which are generally limited to 100 km/h (62 mph), had a fatality rate of 7.7 deaths per billion-travel-kilometers, higher than the 5.2 rate on urban streets (generally limited to 50 km/h (31 mph)), and far higher than the autobahn rate of 2.0; autobahns carried 31% of motorized road traffic while accounting for 11% of Germany's traffic deaths.

A movement to reduce speed limits in residential areas to 20 mph (32 km/h) called "20's Plenty for Us" or "20 is Plenty" started gathering steam in the early 2000s in the United Kingdom. It spread to the United States in 2010.

== Implementation ==
=== Canada ===
In December 2015, the Canadian injury prevention charity Parachute presented the Vision Zero concept, with Road Safety Strategist Matts Belin of Sweden, to nearly 100 road safety partners.

In November 2016, Parachute hosted a one-day national road safety conference focused on Vision Zero goals and strategies, attended by leaders in health, traffic engineering, police enforcement, policy and advocacy.

From that, the Parachute Vision Zero Network was formed, comprising more than 250 road safety advocates and practitioners, law enforcement, government and municipalities. The network serves to provide a one-stop Canadian destination to connect these stakeholders with one other, and with information and resources to help communities address road safety challenges, using proven solutions.

The second Parachute Vision Zero Summit was held in October 2017, attended by network members and politicians, including Ontario Transportation Minister Steven Del Duca.

Another organization, Vision Zero Canada, launched their national campaign in December 2015.

Canadian cities that have taken steps include:

- Brantford, Ontario: A commitment to implementing Vision Zero principles in street planning.
- Edmonton: On 22 September 2015 Edmonton City Council announced that it was "the first Canadian city to officially adopt Vision Zero." Its Road Safety Strategy 2016-2020 moves "towards zero fatal and major-injury collisions" but does not include a target of zero deaths or major injuries. The targets for the strategy are decreased rates of 1) overall injury collisions, and 2) collisions at intersections.
- Hamilton: A commitment to work toward Vision Zero, though funding priorities were criticized by road safety advocates as "fluff" due to a focus on elements such as public education and highways rather than cycling and pedestrian infrastructure improvements or speed limit changes.
- Kitchener: Formal adoption by city council of a Vision Zero strategy in 2020.
- North Bay, Ontario: Creation in 2018 of a city council-endorsed North Bay Vision Zero Committee to advise the city's Engineering Department.
- Ottawa: On 5 July 2017, Ottawa ordered its transportation committee to produce a report with an updated action plan using principles set out in Vision Zero.
- Surrey: On 27 November 2017, Public Safety Committee endorsed adoption of the Vision Zero philosophy as a basis for Surrey's Safe Mobility Plan.
- Toronto: On 13 June 2016 Toronto Mayor John Tory announced a plan to reduce the number of people killed and seriously injured in traffic by 20 per cent within a decade. In 2019, City Council followed up on this initial effort by passing "Vision Zero 2.0", bringing in additional measures like reduced speed limits and automated enforcement.
- Vancouver: On 5 April 2016 Vancouver City Council endorsed Vision Zero by directing staff to report back on a strategy for zero traffic-related fatalities and serious injuries. On 7 September 2018, the City of Vancouver and Hackworks ran a hackathon focused on the Vision Zero Concept.
- Winnipeg: On July 21, 2022, Winnipeg City Council approved its Road Safety Strategic Action Plan.

=== India ===
Haryana became the first state in India to officially adopt vision zero approach. by launching the Haryana Vision Zero program in 2017. The chief minister of Haryana, Manohar Lal Khattar, launched the program on 3 May 2017. The program initially covered 10 districts of Haryana and saw positive results. It has now been expanded to all the districts of the state with positive impact.

=== Netherlands ===
In the Netherlands, the sustainable safety approach differs from Vision Zero in that it acknowledges that in the majority of accidents humans are to blame, and that roads should be designed to be "self-explaining" thus reducing the likelihood of crashes. Self-explaining roads are easy to use and navigate, it being self-evident to road users where they should be and how they should behave. The Dutch also prevent dangerous differences in mass, speeds and/or directions from mixing. Roundabouts create crossings on an otherwise 50 or 50 km/h (31 mph) road that are slow enough, 30 km/h (19 mph), to permit pedestrians and cyclists to cross in safety. Mopeds, cyclists and pedestrians are kept away from cars on separate paths above 30 km/h (19 mph) in the built up area. Buses are also often given dedicated lanes, preventing their large mass from conflicting with low mass ordinary cars.

More recently the Dutch have introduced the idea that roads should also be "forgiving", i.e. designed to lessen the outcome of a traffic collision when the inevitable does occur, principles which are at the core of both the Dutch and Swedish policies.

=== Germany ===
As early as 2008, the German Social Accident Insurance's prevention strategy took up the goal of making working and living environments safer.

=== New Zealand ===
In July 2019, the Sixth Labour Government released its "Road to Zero" 2020-2030 road safety strategy, which proposed reducing speed limits and installing more road safety features. It was modelled after the Vision Zero road-toll reduction movement. The Road to Zero strategy was adopted in 2020. In February 2022, Waka Kotahi NZ Transport Agency and the New Zealand Police launched a public awareness campaign to promote Road to Zero. Waka Kotahi also announced a review of speed limits and tightened speed limit rules around schools.

In March 2024, the Sixth National Government confirmed that it would be fulfilling its pre-election promise of reversing the previous Labour Government's speed limit reductions. These policies have included raising speed limits by 20 km/h, introducing variable speed limits for school zones and assessing speed limit changes against both safety and economic criteria.

=== Sweden ===
In 1997 the Swedish Parliament introduced a "Vision Zero" policy that requires that fatalities and serious injuries are reduced to zero by 2020. This is a significant step-change in transport policy at the European level. All new roads are built to this standard and older roads are modified. Vision Zero also incorporated other countermeasures targeting drivers and vehicles. It is worth noting that Sweden's road death toll was declining prior to 1997 and continued to do so under Vision Zero. However, the number of deaths has not improved since 2013.

Fatalities in Sweden
Yearly fatalities (NUTS2 region) by million inhabitants. View chart definition.
Source: Eurostat

=== United Kingdom ===
Transport appraisal in the United Kingdom is based on New Approach to Appraisal which was first published in 1998 and updated in 2007. UK road safety plans have some similarities with Vision Zero, but do not specifically adopt it in the UK. In 2006 the Stockholm Environment Institute wrote a report at the request of the UK Department for Transport titled 'Vision zero: Adopting a Target of Zero for Road Traffic Fatalities and Serious Injuries'. In 2008 the Road Safety Foundation published a report proposing on UK road safety which referenced Vision Zero. The Campaign for Safe Road Design is a partnership between 13 UK major road safety stakeholders that is calling for the UK Government to invest in a safe road infrastructure which in their view could cut deaths on British roads by 33%. In 2007 Blackpool was the first British City to declare a vision zero target. In 2014 Brighton & Hove adopted vision zero in its "Safer Roads" strategy, predicated on the safe systems approach, alongside the introduction of an ISO accredited road traffic safety management system to ISO:39001. Edinburgh adopted a Road Safety Action Plan: Working Towards Vision Zero in May 2010 which "commits to providing a safe and modern road network where all users are safe from the risk of being killed or seriously injured". Northern Ireland's DOE has a "Share the road to zero" policy for zero deaths. Bristol adopted a safe systems approach in March 2015. Transport for London (TfL) say they are working towards zero KSI. UK Vision Zero campaigns include Vision Zero London and Vision Zero UK. Project EDWARD (Every Day Without A Road Death) was established in 2016 and is an annual UK-wide road safety campaign managed by the Association for Road Risk Management (ARRM) and RoadSafe which promotes an evidence-led "safe system" approach to create a road traffic system free from death and serious injury. Following a public consultation held in mid-2019, a 20 mph speed limit was imposed on all central London roads, which are managed by Transport for London.

=== United States (cities/regions/states) ===
- Chicago: In May 2012, the "Chicago Forward Action Agenda Plan" was introduced aiming to reduce transport deaths to zero in 10 years
- New York City: In January 2014, Mayor Bill de Blasio announced adoption of New York City's Vision Zero plan and enumerated a long list of initiatives to reduce fatalities on city streets, including pushing for changes in the state legislature to allow the city more local control in the administration of traffic safety measures, such as speed reduction. In the first four years of the plan's implementation, traffic injuries and traffic crashes in New York City have been increasing, though deaths have decreased. Recent analyses found an immediate reduction of about 6% in pedestrian crash incidence, and long-term analyses identified overall declines in pedestrian and vehicle occupant casualties over nearly a decade of implementation.
- San Francisco: In January 2014, San Francisco District Supervisors Jane Kim, Norman Yee, and John Avalos introduced Vision Zero plan for San Francisco, where there were 25 pedestrian and bicyclist deaths in 2013 alone. San Francisco's Vision Zero plan calls for investing in engineering, enforcement, and education, and focusing on dangerous intersections. The law was passed with support from all 11 supervisors, including current mayor London Breed. The goal of San Francisco's Vision Zero plan is to eliminate all traffic deaths by 2024.
- In May 2014, Montana launched its VisionZero campaign.
- Los Angeles: In September 2014, Mayor Eric Garcetti and the Los Angeles Department of Transportation released a strategic plan with a Vision Zero goal to eliminate all traffic deaths by 2025.
- Austin: In November 2014, the Austin City Council voted unanimously to form a Vision Zero Task Force to develop an action plan to direct City departments toward policies aligned with safer roadways.
- San Mateo: In February 2015, the San Mateo City Council passed a Sustainable Streets Plan that includes Vision Zero.
- Portland: In February 2015, Portland's Director of Transportation Leah Treat announced a ten-year plan to end traffic fatalities in the city as part of the Portland Bureau of Transportation's 2-year work plan.
- Seattle: Feb. 2015: Seattle launches Vision Zero plan to end traffic deaths and injuries by 2030
- San Jose: On 12 May 2015, San Jose's 11-member City Council unanimously adopted Vision Zero San Jose
- Santa Barbara: In May 2015, the Santa Barbara City Council embraced the goal of zero traffic fatalities within city limits.
- San Diego: On 22 June 2015, San Diego Mayor Kevin Faulconer announced his support for Vision Zero at a press conference with Mayor Pro Tem Marti Emerald and Council Member Mark Kersey
- Fort Lauderdale: In November 2015, the Fort Lauderdale City Commission passed Vision Zero Fort Lauderdale to commit to reduce all pedestrian and bicyclist fatalities to zero. In passing Vision Zero Fort Lauderdale, the city has become the first city in the state of Florida and the first city in the Southeastern United States to become a Vision Zero City.
- Boston: Boston launched Vision Zero in December 2015.
- Washington, D.C.: In December 2015, Washington, D.C.'s Department of Transportation announced an initiative to eliminate traffic fatalities and serious injuries by 2024. The initiative was endorsed by Mayor Muriel Bowser. Press coverage focused on high traffic fines (up to $1,000) for speeding. In August 2024, thirty-three people had already been killed in crashes that year and the city was on track to match 2023's 52 traffic deaths, a 16-year high.
- Denver, Colorado In February 2016, the city and county of Denver announced its commitment to Vision Zero. As one of 20 Vision Zero cities at the time, Denver set a goal of zero deaths by 2030. The Denver Streets Partnership coalition organizes periodic Denver Streets Congress meetings to present, discuss and plan Vision Zero policy, funding and implementation of people-friendly street programs.
- North Carolina: In October 2016, North Carolina implemented the NC Vision Zero initiative, using data-driven strategies, to take one step further in eliminating roadway deaths.
- Philadelphia: In November 2016, Mayor Jim Kenney issued an executive order to establish an Office of Complete Streets as well as a Vision Zero Task Force. In March 2024, Mayor Cherelle Parker signed an executive order recommitting the city to Vision Zero.
- Minneapolis: The City of Minneapolis adopted the Vision Zero Resolution in 2017, which sets a goal of eliminating traffic deaths and severe injuries on city streets by 2027.
- North Dakota: On 18 January 2018, Governor Doug Burgum announced the Vision Zero goal for North Dakota in his State of the State address using the slogan "Zero Fatalities, Zero Excuses."
- Tempe, Arizona: On 8 February 2018, Mayor Mark Mitchell and the Tempe city council unanimously committed to Vision Zero.
- Longmont, Colorado: On 21 April 2023, Mayor Joan Peck and the Longmont city council adopted Vision Zero as a comprehensive approach to ending serious injuries and traffic fatalities by 2040.
- Boulder, Colorado: March 2018 formal adoption of Vision Zero, April 2020 adoption of "20 is Plenty" speed limits.
- Denver, Colorado regional plan: August 2019 by the Denver Regional Council of Governments representing 56 municipalities and counties.
- Maryland: During the 2019 legislative session, the Maryland General Assembly passed HB 885, sponsored by Delegate Julie Palakovich Carr, for the state of Maryland to pursue Vision Zero. The legislation was signed into law by Governor Larry Hogan and went into effect on 1 October 2019.
- Wisconsin: Although not under the same name, Wisconsin's Department of Transportation has committed to a "Zero in Wisconsin" public service campaign since 2011, which includes efforts to curtail impaired driving with regular accident prevention measures and multiple public service campaigns.
- Albuquerque, New Mexico: Mayor Tim Keller signed an executive order in May 2019 committing the City of Albuquerque to Vision Zero and eliminating traffic deaths in the city by 2040. The City of Albuquerque released its Vision Zero Action Plan in May 2021.
- Cincinnati: In July 2019, the city launched its Vision Zero planning process.
- Houston: In August 2019, Mayor Sylvester Turner signed the Vision Zero Executive Order, with the goal of ending all traffic deaths and serious injuries by 2030. However, in 2024 Mayor John Whitmire deemphasized Vision Zero, claiming it will be "one of many tools" used to eliminate traffic deaths.
- Alameda, California: "In late 2019, the Alameda City Council adopted a resolution establishing Vision Zero as the city's guiding principle for transportation planning, design, and maintenance. In 2021, the City of Alameda will complete a Vision Zero Action Plan that includes specific actions and policy changes to increase street safety in Alameda."
- Dallas: "In December of 2019, the Dallas City Council adopted a resolution to eliminate traffic fatalities and cut severe traffic injuries in half by 2030 by implementing Vision Zero."
- Mountain View, California: "On December 10, 2019, Mountain View City Council unanimously adopted a Vision Zero Policy to eliminate fatal traffic collisions in Mountain View by 2030."
- Lancaster, Pennsylvania: On 24 November 2020, Lancaster City Council adopted a Vision Zero Action Plan, with the goal of eliminating fatalities and serious injuries by 2030.
- Indianapolis: On 12 August 2024, the Indianapolis City-County Council voted to adopt Proposal No. 224 which commits the city to eliminate all traffic fatalities and severe injuries by 2035. The proposal includes staffing a full-time Vision Zero administrator and forming a 15-member task force to oversee the development and implementation of a Vision Zero action plan.

== Other safety initiatives ==
=== EuroRAP ===
Across Europe, EuroRAP, the European Road Assessment Programme, is bringing together a partnership of motoring organisations, vehicle manufacturers and road authorities to develop protocols for identifying and communicating road accident risk and to develop tools and best practice guidelines for engineering safer roads. EuroRAP aims to support governments in meeting their Vision Zero targets.

The "Roadmap to a Single European Transport Area" issued in 2011 by the European Commission states in point 2.5 (9): "By 2050, move close to zero fatalities in road transport. In line with this goal, the EU aims at halving road casualties by 2020."

=== United Nations ===
The United Nations has more modest goals. Its "Decade of Action for Road Safety" is founded on a goal to "stabilize and then reduce" road traffic fatalities by 2020. It established the Road Safety Fund "to encourage donor, private sector and public support for the implementation of a Global Plan of Action."

== Outcomes ==
Despite some countries borrowing some ideas from the Vision Zero project, it has been noted that the richer countries have been making outstanding progress in reducing traffic deaths while the poorer countries tend to see an increase in traffic fatalities due to increased motorization. Some locales have seen divergent results between the number of accidents and injuries on the one hand, and the number of deaths; in the first four years of the plan's implementation in New York City, for example, traffic injuries and traffic crashes have been increasing, though deaths have decreased.

Road fatalities in 2013, with comparison to 1980, by country
| Country | 1980 killed | 2013 killed | 2013/1980 percent | 2013 killed per million population | 2013 killed per 100 billion vehicle-kilometers |
|---|---|---|---|---|---|
| Australia | 3,272 | 1,185 | 36.2 | 51 | 496 |
| Austria | 2,003 | 455 | 22.7 | 54 | 583 |
| Belgium | 2,396 | 723 | 30.2 | 65 | 707 |
| Canada | 5,462 | 2,255 | 41.3 | 65 | |
| Czech Republic | 1,261 | 655 | 52.9 | 62 | 1,573 |
| Denmark | 690 | 191 | 27.7 | 34 | 386 |
| Finland | 551 | 258 | 46.8 | 48 | 476 |
| France | 13,636 | 3,268 | 24.0 | 51 | |
| Germany | 15,050 | 3,339 | 22.2 | 41 | 460 |
| Greece | 1,446 | 874 | 60.4 | 79 | |
| Hungary | 1,630 | 591 | 36.3 | 60 | |
| Ireland | 564 | 190 | 33.7 | 41 | 396 |
| Italy | 9,220 | 3,385 | 36.7 | 57 | |
| Japan | 11,388 | 5,152 | 45.2 | 40 | 694 |
| Luxembourg | 98 | 45 | 45.9 | 84 | |
| Netherlands | 1,996 | 476 | 23.8 | 28 | 374 |
| Norway | 362 | 187 | 51.7 | 37 | 426 |
| Poland | 6,002 | 3,357 | 55.9 | 87 | |
| Portugal | 2,850 | 637 | 23.4 | 61 | |
| Slovenia | 558 | 125 | 22.4 | 61 | |
| South Korea | 6,449 | 5,092 | 79.0 | 101 | 1,720 |
| Spain | 6,522 | 1,680 | 25.7 | 36 | |
| Sweden | 848 | 260 | 30.7 | 27 | 337 |
| Switzerland | 1,209 | 269 | 22.2 | 33 | 429 |
| United Kingdom | 6,182 | 1,770 | 28.6 | 28 | 348 |
| United States | 51,091 | 32,719 | 64.0 | 104 | 680 |

=== Norway ===
Norway adopted its version of Vision Zero in 1999. In 2008, a staff engineer at the Norwegian Public Roads Administration said "The zero vision has drawn more attention to road safety, but it has not yielded any significant short-term gains so far." Traffic fatalities in Norway has nevertheless continued to decline as time has passed by, and 2020 marked the important milestone of being the first year in Norwegian history to see fewer than 100 road fatalities; 95 people died on Norwegian roads that year. The Norwegian Road Authorities announced that the number of annual fatalities had been cut by more than 80% since the worst year of 1970 when 560 people lost their lives on Norwegian roads – this despite the amount of traffic having more than quadrupled since then.

=== Sweden ===
Sweden, which initiated Vision Zero, has had somewhat better results than Norway. With a population of about 9.6 million, Sweden has a long tradition in setting quantitative road traffic safety targets. In the mid-1990s a 10-year target was set at a 50% reduction for 2007. This target was not met; the actual ten-year reduction was 13% to 471 deaths. The target was revised to 50% by 2020 and to 0 deaths by 2050. In 2009 the reduction from 1997 totals was 34.5% to 355 deaths.

Number of fatalities on Swedish roads
| Accident year | Fatalities |
|---|---|
| 1997 | 541 |
| 1998 | 531 |
| 1999 | 580 |
| 2000 | 591 |
| 2001 | 583 |
| 2002 | 532 |
| 2003 | 529 |
| 2004 | 480 |
| 2005 | 440 |
| 2006 | 445 |
| 2007 | 471 |
| 2008 | 396 |
| 2009 | 355 |
| 2010 | 266 |
| 2011 | 319 |
| 2012 | 285 |
| 2013 | 260 |
| 2014 | 270 |
| 2015 | 259 |
| 2016 | 270 |
| 2017 | 253 |
| 2018 | 324 |
| 2019 | 221 |
| 2020 | 204 |
| 2021 | 192 |

Traffic volume in Sweden increased steadily over the same period.

=== Dominican Republic ===
Vision Zero has influenced other countries, such as the Dominican Republic. The country, despite having the deadliest traffic in the world, has managed to get to a point where only forty Dominicans die per 100,000 Dominicans each year, by following a set of guidelines based on the similar goal of reducing traffic fatalities.

== See also ==
- 30 km/h zone
- Ghost bike – roadside memorials for cyclist traffic fatalities
