= Touring Club Belgium =

Belgian motoring organisation

Touring Club Belgium (TCB) is a motoring organisation providing roadside assistance, insurance, medical insurance and legal support throughout Belgium. TCB is a member of the FIA and ARCEurope.

== Research ==
As well as being an active automobile association TCB also undertakes road safety research.

=== EuroRAP in Belgium ===
TCB is the active member for the European Road Assessment Programme (EuroRAP) in Belgium. TCB regularly publishes maps showing the risk of being involved in an accident.

== Campaigning for Safe Road Design ==
The European Campaign for Safe Road Design is a partnership between 28 major European road safety stakeholders that is calling for the EC to invest in safe road infrastructure initiatives which could cut deaths on European roads by 33% in less than a decade. TCB is the campaign's partner in Belgium.

== See also ==
- EuroRAP
- Campaign for Safe Road Design
