= ADAC =

Largest motoring association in Europe

- Allgemeiner Deutscher Automobil-Club e.V.
- Predecessor: Deutsche Motorradfahrer-Vereinigung
- Established: 24 May 1903; 123 years ago
- Founded at: Stuttgart, Baden-Württemberg, Germany
- Type: Motoring association
- Legal status: Eingetragener Verein (e. V.)
- Purpose: Motor vehicles; Motorsport; Tourism
- Headquarters: Munich, Bavaria, Germany
- Official language: German
- President: Christian Reinicke
- Affiliations: 21,205,353 (31 December 2019)
- Revenue: 215 million €
- Website: www.adac.de (in German)

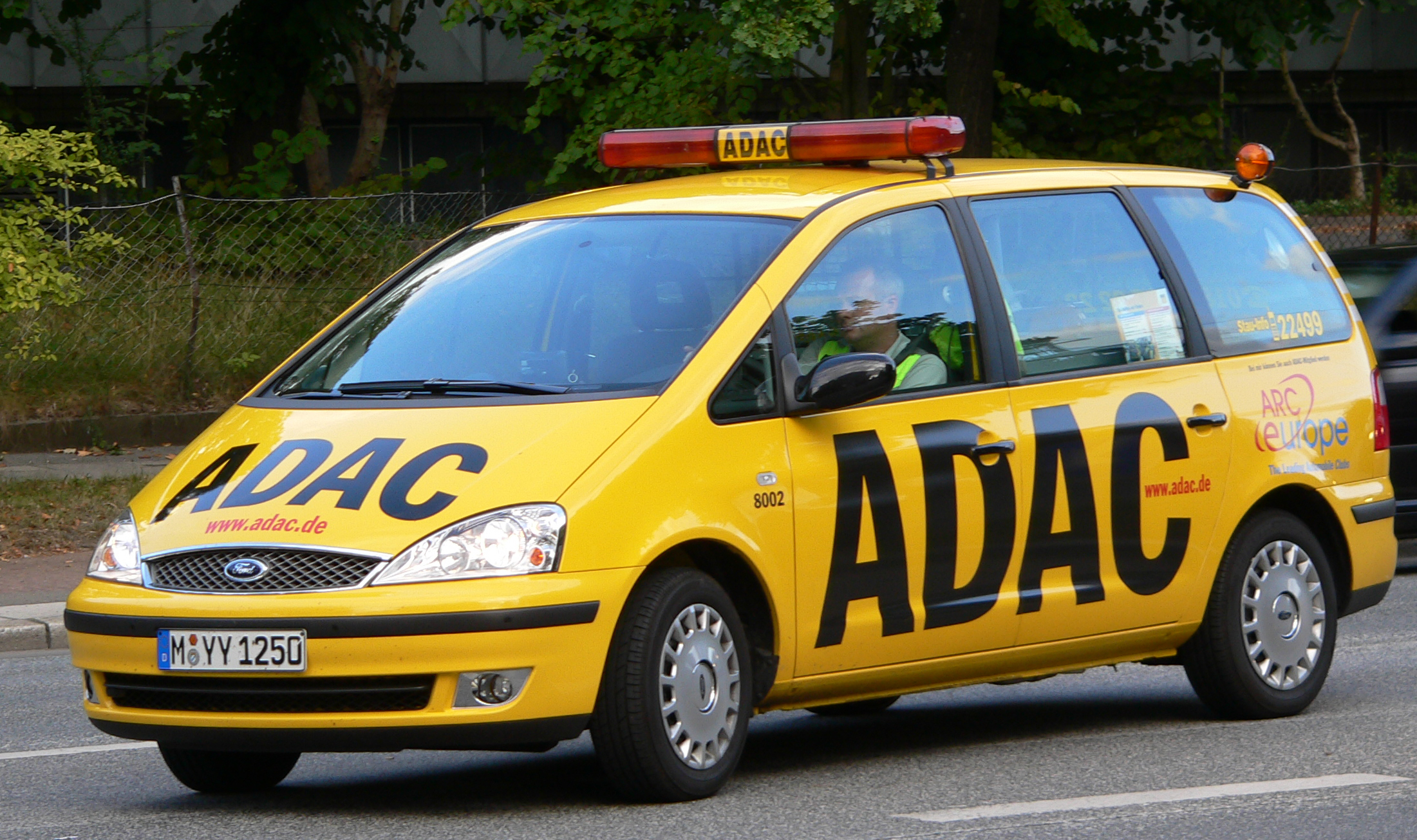
ADAC "Yellow Angel"

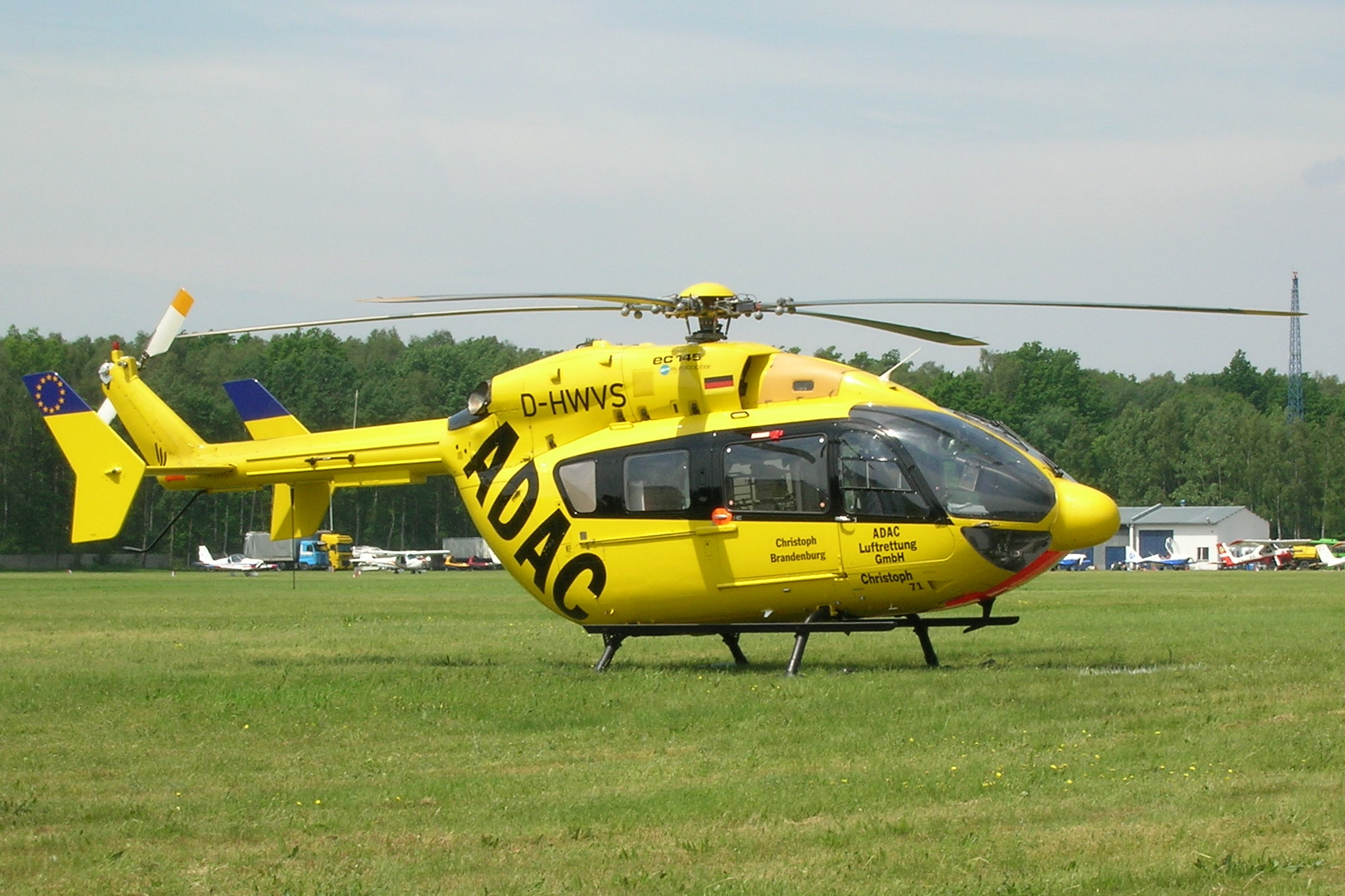
An ADAC Eurocopter EC145

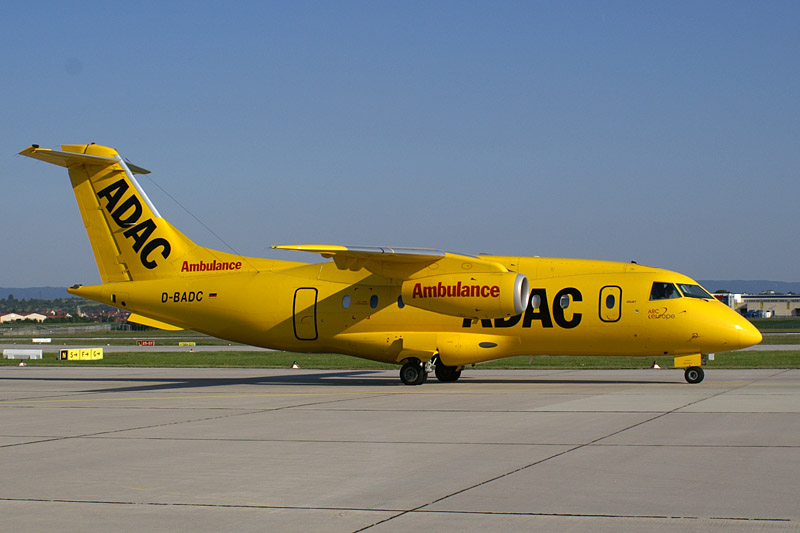
Fairchild Dornier 328JET flying for the ADAC

The ADAC, officially the Allgemeiner Deutscher Automobil-Club (lit. 'General German Automobile Club'), is a German automobile association. It is Europe's largest association of this kind and the largest Verein (club) in Germany, consisting of around 22,2 million members in 2025. The ADAC is also a company and offered several commercial services through ADAC SE. In the 2024 financial year, ADAC SE generated revenue of approximately 1.36 billion euros.

The objective of the ADAC is "the representation, promotion, and advocacy of motoring, motorsport, and tourism interests."

Its well-known service is roadside assistance. ADAC Luftrettung (lit. 'ADAC Air Rescue') operates the largest fleet of ambulance helicopters in Germany.

The ADAC also owns and operates insurance and publishing subsidiaries. ADAC SE operates more than 25 subsidiaries.

== History ==
A German Motorcyclist Association, the Deutsche Motorradfahrer-Vereinigung, was founded on 24 May 1903 at the then-Hotel Silber in Stuttgart. A club for automobiles already existed, the Deutscher Automobilclub (DAC) founded in 1899. Recognised by the Kaiser, it became KAC in 1905, but is known since 1918 as Automobilclub von Deutschland (AvD). It organised the German Grand Prix.

With motorcycles being cheaper than automobiles, that often were driven by a chauffeur rather than by the owner, there were more motorcyclists than automobile enthusiasts, and the DMV soon had more members than the KAC. In 1911, due to an enormous growth in the membership of car owners, the DMV was renamed the Allgemeiner Deutscher Automobil-Club (ADAC). As the KAC and other organisations did, the Prussian eagle was selected as the emblem on the club's badge in appreciation of the Prussian royal family's support and patronage. Its most senior figure at the time was the German Emperor and King of Prussia, Wilhelm II.

The ADAC breakdown roadside assistance service was launched in Germany in 1927 under the name of ADAC-Straßen-Hilfsdienst.

After the Nazi get elected in power in 1933, the ADAC quickly adapted to the Nazi regime, introduced the Aryan Paragraph, and lost its independence in the course of the Gleichschaltung. The Nazi Party amalgamated all motoring organisations in Germany into the DDAC (Der Deutsche Automobil-Club e.V.), an umbrella association that was allowed to exist in the shadow of the NSKK (National Socialist Motor Corps). A DDAC appeal described the 1934 international Automobile Exhibition as a "show for the people" rather than an "exhibition for the more affluent bourgeois segment" of society. "Motoring for the people" (Volkskraftfahrt), it proclaimed, was more "in the spirit of the Führer".

After business activities resumed in 1946, roadside assistance was revived in 1954 under the name ADAC-Straßenwacht ("road patrol"). In 1954, Heinz Frölich became the first of 56 ADAC patrolmen equipped with a motorcycle and sidecar, the latter of which had a large compartment filled with tools and parts for roadside repairs. These original "Gelber Engel" ("Yellow Angels") used NSU Konsul motorcycles. At the end of 1962, ADAC announced the retirement of their motorbike-sidecar combinations, which would be replaced by 40 appropriately equipped Volkswagen Beetles. Equipment on the new cars included a flashing roof light, repair tools, a radio communication device, compressed air canisters, a spade and broom set, and a basic "doctor kit" incorporating blood plasma.

In 1974, the organisation had 3.8 million members at a time when there were 19.0 million passenger cars registered in Germany. By 1990, membership had risen to 10.2 million, with 35.5 million passenger cars registered in the country, so ADAC membership grew more than twice as fast as national car ownership. Growth rates during the ensuing twenty years were greatly boosted by German reunification.

In May 2012, the organisation welcomed its 18 millionth member, and in May 2013, the ADAC fitted out its 10,000th roadside assistance vehicle, a Volkswagen Touran, with several hundred different tools and replacement parts.

In 1997, ADAC opened its new technical centre in Landsberg am Lech, Bavaria.

In 2003, ADAC celebrated its 100th anniversary. In the same year, it criticized the supervised driving at age 17 pilot program in Lower Saxony.

In 2007, the ADAC Stiftung "Gelber Engel" foundation was established. This foundation financially supports survivors of road accidents and funds accident rescue and accident research initiatives and institutions. The ADAC Stiftung "Gelber Engel" ("ADAC 'Yellow Angel' Foundation") has supported victims of road accidents since 2007. In September 2013, that foundation was registered as a gGmbH (a non-profit company).

At the end of 2019, ADAC had 21.2 million members.

== Critics ==
=== More corporate group than association ===
The automobile club operates over 25 subsidiaries, several of which have a non-German legal form. Like its commercial competitors, the ADAC offers travel, emergency services, insurance, and much more for everyone; it operates as an entrepreneur in the market. The ADAC describes itself on its website as a "leading mobility service provider."

In 2012, the Munich District Court investigated the ADAC's status as an association. In a German registered association (Verein), members exercise their participation and control rights primarily through participation in the general meeting (Mitgliederversammlung). This is also the case with the ADAC. In a stock corporation (Aktiengesellschaft) or cooperative (Genossenschaft), however, members elect not only the board of directors but also, obligatorily, a permanent supervisory body. The ADAC's internal controls were considered inadequate by lawyer and author Dirk-Ulrich Otto.

The Munich District Court has confirmed in 2017 the ADAC's association status. The court announced reject deletion from the association register and justified its decision by stating that it could not establish that the association was operating commercially. The ADAC has since outsourced its commercial activities to a stock corporation ADAC SE whose board of directors is independent of instructions.

=== Manipulation of the tire tests ===
The ADAC published a tire test that, years later, turned out to be fake. The test results were not as they were later presented. An ADAC insider revealed this in 2014. He said that the ADAC provided information to its sympathetic manufacturers about which tire models it wanted to test, where it wanted to test these tires, and under what conditions.

=== Manipulation of the "Yellow Angel" car award ===
In 2014, it was revealed that the ADAC (German Automobile Club) had systematically manipulated its Yellow Angel "Audience Award" for several years.

The vote for "Germany's Favorite Car" was sold to the public through a vote among ADAC members. Instead, this category was an arbitrary award within the ADAC. An analysis of the figures revealed that the alleged "Audience Award" had been awarded at its discretion since at least 2009. The rankings have been manipulated almost every year since 2009. Even earlier elections may not have been clean, but the auditing firm Deloitte lacked the data for this. Preference was given to models that had only just been launched in the spring.

Most car manufactures, including BMW, VW, and Daimler, returned their prizes as "worthless."

=== Mixing automotive journalism and advertising ===
Even after major scandals, the ADAC continued to mix reporting with advertising in its media. For example, it gave the electric Renault Zoe high marks and, at the same time, helped to market this model in 2017. Members could lease it at very favorable terms; this is the terms of a deal between the automobile club and Renault. The ADAC received "marketing subsidies" from Renault for this.

== Associations-Operations ==
According to its article of association, the ADAC's responsibilities lie in the "representation, promotion and advocacy of motoring, motorsport [...] interests" and is dedicated to road traffic, road safety, road safety education, tourism, and the protection of road users' rights. The ADAC has been working closely with its Austrian counterpart, Österreichischer Automobil-, Motorrad- und Touring Club (ÖAMTC), and is one of 78 select associations and federations in Germany eligible to file model declaratory actions (Musterfeststellungsklage).

=== Roadside assistance ===
One of the first service provided by ADAC has been roadside assistance. The ADAC road patrol dates back to 1928, when the ADAC-Straßen-Hilfsdienst (ADAC Roadside Assistance Service) was established. Back then, the patrols used sidecar motorcycles. In 1951, the ADAC started to organise assistance outside Germany. In 1954 breakdown assistance services were resumed by establishing the ADAC Straßenwacht. In 1990, the road patrol started covering the New Länder.

As of 2007, the ADAC operated a fleet of more than 1,700 yellow road patrol vehicles, nicknamed "Yellow Angels". In the 1960s and 1970s, the yellow Volkswagen Beetles were a fixture on German roads. In 2007, the ADAC deployed MPVs, each carrying a myriad of tools, small parts, and replacement batteries. As of 2020, in the case of a car breakdown, members could request assistance over the phone, over the internet, or via a smartphone app. The patrol driver, sent by a dispatcher, then calls the member several minutes before arrival.

ADAC has also provided Europe-wide breakdown assistance for heavy goods vehicles (HGV). In Germany, ADAC has used special breakdown assistance vehicles for HGVs. In other European countries, ADAC partners provide assistance.

In 2021, road patrols and ADAC mobility partners were dispatched in 3.5 million cases. In keeping with the previous years, the breakdowns were usually due to problems with the battery.

=== Air rescue and medical services ===
As of 2020, the ADAC operated 55 air ambulance helicopters for urgent medical rescues in Germany, strategically placed so that any location can be reached within 15 minutes. Air ambulance jets are used by the ADAC to serve "Plus" members or ADAC international travel insurance customers from any location worldwide in the case of an accident or extreme illness. The ADAC also offers membership to non-German residents, having signed contracts with automobile clubs worldwide. In the UK, it is possible to have breakdown recovery through the local AA while having an ADAC membership.

As of 2022 ADAC Luftrettung ("Air Rescue") gGmbH is the largest civilian rotor-wing air medical organisation in Germany, followed by DRF Luftrettung.

In an extension of its helicopter ambulance operations, the ADAC holds shares in Aero-Dienst, which enables it to operate a small fleet of fixed-wing ambulance aircraft for mid-range medical repatriation.

=== Testing and technical services ===
The ADAC established its own technical centre at Landsberg am Lech near Munich in 1997. Technical tests regularly include cars, tyres, child restraint systems, pedelecs, safety helmets, and accessories such as roof boxes. New products and technologies are tested as soon as they become available. The German Federal Motor Transport Authority recognised the facility as compliant with the DIN EN ISO/IEC 17025 standard. The testing operations are certified to ISO 9001:2015.

=== Research ===
The ADAC has been an active member of the European Road Assessment Program (EuroRAP) in Germany. The ADAC regularly publishes maps showing safety characteristics of German roads. These maps, based on EuroRAP's Road Protection Score Protocol (or Star Rating Protocol), are a measure of how well a road protects road users in the event of an accident. Data on road characteristics is gathered by driving through road inspections using a specially equipped inspection vehicle. Assessors then produce a safety star rating, which is comparable across Europe.

The ADAC has also undertaken road inspections on behalf of other EuroRAP members, including the Road Safety Foundation in the UK.

=== Motorsport ===
Both the ADAC and its older competitor Automobilclub von Deutschland (AvD; the organizer of the German Grand Prix), have been members of the FIA and the DMSB. The European Grand Prix, the former ADAC Eifelrennen, the 24 Hours Nürburgring and many other races have been hosted by ADAC.

In June 2008, the ADAC suspended its involvement with the FIA over the scandal surrounding Max Mosley and his subsequent retention as FIA president.

==== ADAC Stiftung Sport ====
ADAC Stiftung Sport is a foundation set up in 1998 to promote and support German racing talent. Young racers showing potential are offered the opportunity to benefit from the support of experts and partners of the foundation. In addition to material backing, grantees are also eligible to benefit from training and coaching in many fields. In addition, the foundation also devotes funds to increasing motorsport safety and supporting non-professional racers injured in accidents.

==== Road safety advocacy ====
In 2006, ADAC published a series of critical press releases on the issue of "driving licence shopping" – getting a driving license in another country after having one's licence revoked in their home country – and advocated the speedy harmonisation of driver licensing in Europe.

Some ADAC positions are controversial, questioning the benefit for road safety of some planned measures or rather implying the opposite. As of 2010, the club had argued its opposition to a general speed limit on German motorways by citing the finding that statistically, motorways were already the safest roads in Germany in terms of accidents, and that a speed limit would not significantly reduce the severity of accidents. In 2021, supporters of a speed limit, such as the Verkehrsclub Deutschland e. V., argued that the measure would indeed reduce the risk and the severity of accidents, and would help avoid motorway fatalities and severe injuries to the order of hundreds. In 2020, the ADAC was quoted as no longer principally opposing Autobahn speed limits and said to have ceased making recommendations to policymakers on the issue.

As of 2009, the European Campaign for Safe Road Design was a partnership between 28 major European road safety stakeholders that called for the European Commission to invest in safe road infrastructure initiatives. ADAC is the campaign's partner in Germany.

== ADAC SE ==
ADAC SE operates more than 25 subsidiaries.

=== ADAC Versicherung AG (insurance) ===
ADAC Versicherung AG offers traditional association-based insurance products, such as travel health insurance, legal expenses insurance, and accident insurance.

=== ADAC Autoversicherung AG (insurance) ===
ADAC Autoversicherungs AG is a joint venture of ADAC with Allianz SE.

=== ADAC Autovermietung GmbH (car rental) ===
Arrangement and provision of rental cars and mobility services, both domestically and abroad. ADAC partner is french Europcar.

=== ADAC Reisevertrieb GmbH (tourism) ===
ADAC Reisen is based in Frankfurt and operates tourism services, travel agency services, and club-style holidays.

=== ADAC Finandienste GmbH (Financial services) ===
ADAC offers financial products, primarily the ADAC credit cards as well as vehicle financing. For a long time, the ADAC credit card was issued in cooperation with Landesbank Berlin (LBB). It is now issued by Solaris SE.

=== ADAC Service GmbH ===
The company offers general services related to the core elements of the ADAC, as well as home assistance (e.g., tradesperson and locksmith services).

== Organisation ==
In 2016, ADAC restructured its organisation, implementing a 3-pillar structure comprising an association (ADAC e.V.), a societas Europaea (ADAC SE) and a foundation (ADAC Stiftung). This structure was adopted by the vote of 200 delegates during a General Assembly in late 2014, and finalised in detail in 2015. At the 2016 ADAC General Assembly in Lübeck, the delegates agreed to the reorganised structure. This structure was fully implemented by early 2017.

ADAC e.V. provides core membership benefits. The ADAC e.V. Executive Board is the remunerated executive body responsible for the club's management.

Commercial activities have been devolved to ADAC SE, an autonomous public company limited by shares that is separate from the association. ADAC e.V. held a 57.74% majority of ADAC SE shares. Other shareholders included the ADAC foundation (25.10%) and, via private equity companies, several ADAC regional clubs (17.16%). The ADAC foundation has pooled ADAC's charitable and public benefit activities such as the promotion and support of rescue in life-threatening situations, accident prevention, scholarship & research, education, and charity.

=== General Assembly ===
The ADAC General Assembly convenes annually. Every four years, it elects the members of the ADAC Committee. The General Assembly is composed of the delegates of the regional clubs, the members of the ADAC Administrative Council, and an ADAC Committee. One delegate represents 100,000 regional club members (or a fraction thereof). By unanimous vote, the Committee may bestow honorary membership on persons from Germany or abroad in recognition of special merits in the cause of motoring. They enjoy the same rights and privileges as regular members.

In December 2014, August Markl was elected ADAC President. In May 2019 Over 200 delegates at the General Assembly at the Nürburgring elected Ulrich Klaus Becker as vice president, Karsten Schulze as Technical Services President, Gerhard Hillebrand as Transport President, and Jens Kuhfuß as Finance President. With President August Markl, ADAC Sport President Hermann Tomczyk, and Tourism President Kurt Heinen, they formed the newly constituted seven-strong ADAC Committee. The term of office of the Committee members is four years, with re-elections allowed. Committee meetings are attended by the Chief Legal Advisor.

In November 2019, the General Assembly in Munich adopted a new Premium membership, adding numerous features to the existing Plus membership, adjusted membership fees for the available tiers. It adopted generally amended Articles of Association to better differentiate between the club's executive and advisory bodies and convey a clear assignment of responsibilities.

In 2021, the General Assembly elected Christian Reinicke as ADAC President, Gerd Ennser as ADAC Sport President, and Karlheinz Jungbeck as ADAC Tourism President.

=== ADAC Administrative Council ===
The ADAC Administrative Council is composed of the members of the Committee and the 18 chairmen of the Regional Clubs (or their deputies in the Regional Club Boards). Decisions of the Administrative Council are binding towards all Regional Clubs.

=== Affiliations ===
The ADAC is affiliated with the Fédération Internationale de l'Automobile, the international automobile federation, the Fédération Internationale des Véhicules Anciens, the international historic vehicles federation, Euro NCAP, a crash test consortium, Pro Mobilität, a Berlin-based lobbying organisation promoting the expansion and maintenance of the road network, the European Movement Germany network and EuropeNet24, a Europe-wide breakdown assistance network for large goods vehicles.

== Public relations ==
ADAC is among Germany's most influential associations and one of the biggest lobbying associations worldwide. Public relations activities focus on topics such as maintaining motorised mobility, traffic laws and fines, and road safety education. In recent years, ADAC has developed a growing interest in other transport operators and modes, for instance, by conducting tests on local public transport and urban cycling.

The ADAC publishes ADAC Motorwelt, one of the largest magazines in Germany. The magazine is distributed four times a year to ADAC members, and features articles of common interest to all participants of public traffic, such as product tests, safe driving tips, and places to visit by car or motorcycle. Since 2020, ADAC Motorwelt has been available to membership card holders at local ADAC offices, travel agencies, and driver safety locations, as well as Edeka and Netto supermarkets.

== Financial reports ==
In 2014 the club had a yield of €911 million (profit €25 million) and the ADAC holding company ADAC Beteiligungs- und Wirtschaftsdienst GmbH had a yield of €1,004 million (profit €84.9 million). For the fiscal year 2019, ADAC e.V.'s earnings year from membership stood at €10.1 million. Including financial and holdings earnings, the club's annual result was €43.7 million. In addition to the dividend paid out by ADAC SE, the legal entity reuniting all ADAC commercial activities, continuous membership growth, and an efficiency program positively impacted the annual result. In 2019, ADAC e.V.'s income from membership fees and the co-financing of membership benefits grew by €22.6 million from the previous year to reach €836.3 million. As in previous years, the bulk of this income (€631 million) was spent on assistance services. At the end of 2020, ADAC e.V. had 20.2 million members.

== See also ==
- Breakdown (vehicle)
- Breakdown Cover
- European Campaign for Safe Road Design
- EuroRAP
