= EuroRAP =

European road safety organization

European Road Assessment Association AISBL
- Founded: 2002
- Founders: ADAC, ANWB, TRL, RSF
- Type: AISBL
- Purpose: Road traffic safety
- Location: Basingstoke, England, United Kingdom
- Region served: Europe
- Method: EuroRAP, European Campaign for Safe Road Design
- Website: eurorap.org

European Road Assessment Programme (EuroRAP) is an international nonprofit (vzw) organisation registered in Belgium. It operates from Worting House, Basingstoke, Hampshire.

In partnership with national motoring organisations and local authorities, EuroRAP assesses roads in Europe to show how well they protect life in the event of a crash. It is a sister programme to Euro NCAP, and seeks to improve road safety through road design. EuroRAP currently has active programmes in 29 countries, mostly in Europe.

EuroRAP is financially supported by the FIA Foundation for the Automobile and Society, the International Road Assessment Programme, and the European Association of Motor Manufacturers. Programmes are typically self-financed by in-country automobile associations and national governments. Specific projects receive funding from the World Bank, Global Road Safety Facility, and institutions such as the European Commission.

EuroRAP has received three Prince Michael International Road Safety Awards; the first in 2004 for founding the European programme, the second in 2009 for founding the International Road Assessment Programme, and the third in 2014.

== Aims and philosophy ==
EuroRAP aims to reduce the likelihood of traffic collisions and make those that do occur survivable. Its formal objectives are to:

- reduce death and serious injury on Europe's roads by identifying major safety shortcomings that can be addressed by practical road improvement measures;
- ensure that risk assessment is always considered when strategic decisions on route improvements and crash protection are made;
- forge partnerships between those responsible for a safe road system (motoring organisations, vehicle manufacturers and road authorities).

EuroRAP supports the UN Decade of Action for Road Safety 2012–2020.

== Membership ==
EuroRAP is a membership-based organisation, with members in high- and low-income countries. There are three categories of membership:

- Civil Society Members: autoclubs and charities are active members and are responsible for managing the European programme and internal development of the association
- Authority Members: national and regional government, roads agencies and others whose primary contribution is in the development of the techniques being employed and their policy implications
- Expert Members: universities, individuals, research organisations and corporate supporters who make a special contribution to the association either financially or technically.

== Road safety schemes ==
EuroRAP has developed standardised protocols for showing the safety level of a road providing a common language that everyone can speak. In low and middle income countries, the EuroRAP methodology provides a structure to measure and manage road safety risk, the basic building blocks of which are often lacking. As a result, these nations can often be faster and more innovative in applying new solutions. EuroRAP encourages countries to focus on their busiest roads where the largest crash savings can be made and therefore countries do not need to include their entire road network in RAP analysis to make a large difference.

=== Risk mapping ===
Based on real crash and traffic flow data, colour-coded maps show a road's safety performance by measuring and mapping the rate at which road users are being killed or seriously injured. Different maps can be produced depending on the target audience. These include:

- Crashes per km
- Crashes per km travelled
- Crash costs per km and per km travelled
- Potential crash savings per km and per km travelled

Risk is shown in colour-coded bandings from high (black), to low risk (green).

=== Performance tracking ===
The establishment of road safety targets requires that safety performance can be monitored over time. Governments and funding agencies can also benefit from evaluating the road safety impacts of their investments. Performance tracking identifies whether fewer people are being killed or seriously injured on a road section over time and the countermeasures that have been most effective, including cost, in reducing crashes and injury severity.

Safety performance indicators also provide an effective means of monitoring performance. Measures such as helmet and seat belt wearing rates have been used effectively in assessing road safety behaviour, as have speed measurements and conflict studies, and RAP star ratings provide a set of safety performance indicators for road infrastructure.

=== Star rating ===
Star ratings are used to show the likelihood of a fatal or serious crash and how well the road infrastructure would protect from death or serious injury when a crash occurs. By systematically inspecting roads, countries can develop an understanding of the level of risk built into their road networks. This provides the basis for targeting high risk sections for improvement before people are killed or seriously injured. Inspections are especially useful when crash data is unavailable or unreliable.

Inspections are undertaken using specially equipped vehicles to collect digital, panoramic images or videos of roads as they are driven. These images are then used to record (or 'code') road design attributes known to influence the likelihood of a crash and its severity. The inspections create a permanent video and database record that can be reviewed easily by local engineers and planners. The attributes recorded at 100 metre intervals include:

- Traffic speeds
- Number of lanes and lane width
- Paved shoulder width
- Rumble strips
- Curvature and curve quality
- Roadside design and obstacles
- Pavement condition
- Overtaking demand
- Intersection layout, volume and quality
- Bicycle facilities
- Pedestrian crossing facilities and quality

Roads are awarded stars for the level of safety they offer. These range from 1 (high risk) to 5 (low risk).

To enable cost-effective assessment of roads, there is a global network of RAP-accredited suppliers who are capable of competitively bidding to undertake high quality inspections and coding.

=== Safer Roads Investment Plans ===
Where star ratings provide a measure of risk on a road, Safer Roads Investment Plans identify ways in which the star ratings can be improved in a cost-effective way. There is evidence that well-targeted road safety improvements save lives, at both individual locations and across networks. For example, on a section of the A4128 in the UK, speed reductions, improved signs and markings, intelligent road studs, traffic calming and upgraded pedestrian crossings helped cut the number of fatal and serious crashes from 19 in 2004–06 to two in 2007–09 – an 89% reduction.

The Safer Roads Investment Plans include extensive planning and engineering information such as road attribute records, countermeasure proposals and economic assessments for 100 metre sections of road. They are supported by online software.

To date, Safer Roads Investment Plans have been used to identify improvements in low- and middle-income countries that could prevent more than 50,000 deaths and serious injuries per year, saving around $1.2 billion per year in crash costs avoided.

== Countries and organisations involved ==
29 countries are currently involved in EuroRAP. Countries themselves are not members, but organisations based in those countries can be.

In this list, countries are given with the year they first became involved and the organisation that made them involved.

- 2002: Belgium (EuroRAP previously operated from Brussels, also TCB)
- 2002: Netherlands (ANWB)
- 2002: Germany (ADAC)
- 2003: Sweden (Motormännens riksförbund)
- 2002: United Kingdom (the Road Safety Foundation)
- 2003: Republic of Ireland (NRA)
- 2003: France (ACAFA)
- 2003: Spain (RACE, Real Automóvil Club de España)
- 2003: Switzerland (TCS)
- 2003: Finland (Autoliitto)
- 2003: Slovenia (AMZS, Auto-Moto Zveza Slovenije)
- 2003: Norway (NAF)
- 2003: Austria (ÖAMTC, Österreichische Automobil-, Motorrad- und Touring Club)
- 2004: Italy (ACI)
- 2004: Iceland (FIB, Félag íslenskra bifreiðaeigenda)
- 2005: Croatia (HAK)
- 2005: Czech Republic (UAMK, General Auto-Moto-Club of the Czech Republic)
- 2005: Slovakia (SATC, Slovensky Autoturist Klub)
- 2006: Poland (University of Gdańsk)
- 2007: Serbia (AMSS, Automobile and Motorcycle Association of Serbia)
- 2007: Bosnia and Herzegovina (BIHAMK)
- 2007: Macedonia (AMSM)
- 2007: Poland (PZM)
- 2008: Montenegro (AMSCG, Auto-moto Savez Crne Gore)
- 2010: Greece (Automobile and Touring Club of Greece (ELPA))
- 2011: Portugal (ACP, Automóvel Club de Portugal)
- 2011: Israel (MEMSI, Israel Automobile and Touring Club)
- 2011: Albania (ACA, Automobile Club Albania)
- 2012: Belarus (BKA, Belarusian Auto Moto Touring Club)

== See also ==
- Campaign for Safe Road Design
- European Campaign for Safe Road Design
- Road-traffic safety
- Road safety in Europe
