= European Campaign for Safe Road Design =

European road safety campaign

The European Campaign for Safe Road Design aims to influence the European Union to make safe road design a European transport priority and save unnecessary deaths on Europe's roads. The campaign is a partnership between 28 road safety stakeholders from across Europe, claiming that a formal safe road infrastructure initiative could reduce the number of killed and seriously injured by 50,000 per year in less than a decade, saving 0.5% of GDP - €50 billion, saving at least 300 deaths and serious injuries per day. The European campaign builds on the UK Campaign for Safe Road Design which has worked to influence the UK government since 2008.

== Case for the campaign ==
The Campaign argues that 2,000,000 people have been killed or seriously injured on Europe's roads in the last decade, costing €160billion per year, or 2% of GDP. They state that road deaths are the leading cause of death amongst healthy young adults. Two-thirds of road deaths occur on national or regional roads outside major towns. The EC has started its 10-year road safety review, and the campaign suggests that systematic Safe Road Infrastructure Initiatives could cut casualties by one third in a decade, a reduction of 50,000 annually. This would equate to a saving of 0.5% of GDP or €50 billion, saving 300 deaths and serious injuries every day.

The campaign argues that all it takes for the achievement of its objectives is a modest investment in simple safety engineering, particularly in the area of safe road and junction layouts as well as equipment like safety barriers. The idea is that the European roads must be "self-explaining" and forgiving so that they address or do not exacerbate routine human driving errors. These road infrastructure safety measures can reduce serious crashes by more than half.

== Examples of unsafe road design and resulting consequences ==
According to Joanne Hill, head of the UK’s Campaign for Safe Road Design, the way risks are managed in most European roads is a century out of date and that the situation calls for actions that are more than just treating black spots and focus on systematically eliminating high risks. The European Road Assessment Programme (EuroRAP) has published a map of busy, high-risk road networks in 15 EU countries based on crash rates. The following are examples of unsafe road designs:

=== Unsafe outercurves ===
Old roads, designed before entering the automobile speed era, often have improperly banked outercurves (for physical analysis, see banked turn). This causes instability to cornering vehicles. While almost all outercurves have insufficient banking, some few outercurves have too much banking. In slippery condition, such as in rain or on ice, such over-banked curves cause most problem to vehicles driven at too slow speed. Then the driver may need to turn the steering wheel to the opposite direction, compared to the road curvature.

Both new and old roads often have insufficient drainage gradient at the entrance and exit of sharp outercurves, causing water pooling in rain and forming local surprising ice spots in cold climate. A large study in Sweden (see the linked "Analysis of single vehicle accidents with fatal outcome" below) showed that fatal single crashes are 5 times more common in outercurves, than in innercurves. This extreme overrisk is considered strongly related to improper banking and insufficient drainage gradient at outercurves. Both Drainage gradient and curve banking can be monitored by measurement with a modern Profilograph. The linked EU Roadex III report below gives demonstrations as on how to analyze Profilograph data to identify excessive accident risk in outercurves.

=== Ramp-shaped crash barriers ===
Crash barriers are very efficient at increasing road safety. However, many barriers starts off with a ramp-shaped end. As a car slightly out of control hits such a ramp, the car become airborne and all tendency to recover control is lost. Often the car rotates and hit a hard object with its roof. Since the roof is the cars weakest section, such crashes often end fatally. In many cases the car flips totally. If it lands in water, the doors may be blocked, stopping the driver and passengers from getting out before the car is filled with water. A surprisingly high number of car drivers have drowned during their rides.

== Partners ==
The campaign is a partnership between 28 motoring clubs and road safety organisations from across Europe including:

- Lead partner EuroRAP
- Austria - OEAMTC
- Belgium - TCB
- Croatia - HAK
- Czech Republic - UAMK
- Denmark - FDM - FDM (in Danish)
- Finland - Autoliitto Autolitto (in Finnish)
- France - FFAC
- German - ADAC
- Hungary - KTI and MAK
- Iceland - FIB
- Ireland - AA Ireland
- Italy - ACI (in Italian)
- Macedonia - AMSM
- Montengero - AMSCG
- Netherlands - ANWB
- Norway - NAF
- Poland - PZM and FRIL
- Serbia - AMSS (in Serbian)
- Slovakia - SATC
- Slovenia - AMZS
- Spain - RACC and RACE
- Sweden - Motormannen Riksforbund (in Swedish)
- Switzerland - TCS
- UK - Road Safety Foundation

== See also ==
- EuroRAP
- Road safety in Europe
