= International Road Assessment Programme =

The International Road Assessment Programme or iRAP assesses roads all over the world and aims to significantly reduce road casualties by improving the safety of road infrastructure.

== History ==
iRAP was formed in 2006 as an umbrella organisation for EuroRAP, usRAP and AusRAP and also to facilitate work in middle and low income countries.

In 2006 and 2007 four pilot studies in Malaysia, Chile, Costa Rica and South Africa have been undertaken. These studies showed that road assessment is also helpful in developing countries. High-risk roads where large numbers are killed or seriously injured are inspected and affordable programmes of safety engineering are identified. As the percentage of vulnerable road users, like pedestrians and two-wheelers among the road deaths is high in those countries, iRAP focuses on measures to improve road design especially for these users.

The pilot studies have been supported by national motoring organisations, authorities and by teams that have been formed as part of EuroRAP, usRAP and AusRAP.

== Pilot projects ==
Chile

- 46% of road deaths are pedestrians and 10% are cyclists (2004) source: iRAP
- usRAP team coordinates the work in Chile
- regional team consists of ACCHI (Chilean Automobile Club), AAAFTS (American Automobile Association Foundation for Traffic Safety), MRI (Midwest Research Institute), ISU (Iowa State University), RACC (Spanish Automobile Club)
- 2500 km of roads have been inspected (18% of paved national roads)
- inspections included 6 of 13 regions in Chile

Costa Rica

- 57% of road deaths are pedestrians (2005) source: iRAP
- usRAP team coordinates the work in Costa Rica
- regional team consists of ACCR (Automobile Club Costa Rica), AAAFTS (American Automobile Association Foundation for Traffic Safety), MRI (Midwest Research Institute), ISU (Iowa State University), RACC (Spanish Automobile Club)
- project supported by Cosevi (Road Safety Council) and by the Ministry of Public Works and Transportation
- 2500 km of roads have been inspected (58% of paved national highway network).
- parts of the Pan American Highway (Routes 1 and 2) from Nicaragua to Panama has been included in the inspections

Malaysia

- 66% of road deaths are motorcyclists (2006) source: iRAP
- AusRAP team coordinates the work in Malaysia
- regional team consists of AAM (Automobile Association Malaysia), JKJR (Road Safety Department), AAA (Australian Automobile Association), ARRB Group
- project supported by Ministry of Works and Ministry of Transport, JKR (Public Works Department), LLM (Malaysian Highway Authority), MIROS (Malaysian Institute of Road Safety Research), JPJ (Malaysian Road Transport Department), Royal Malaysian Police, PLUS & MTD (Toll road operators), UPM (Universiti Putra Malaysia), IKRAM (Institut Kerja Raya Malaysia)
- over 3000 km of roads have been inspected (5% of Malaysia's paved roads)
- Express Tollway (E1, E2, E8) and Federal Roads (F1, F2, F3, F4, F5, F8, F67, F68, F76) have been inspected

South Africa

- 42% of road deaths are pedestrians (2006) source: iRAP
- EuroRAP team coordinates the work together with ADAC
- 2100 km of roads in Kwazulu-Natal have been inspected (4% of South Africa's paved roads)
- regional team consists of AASA (Automobile Association South Africa), TRL (Transport Research Laboratory), ADAC and SWECO

== AusRAP ==
The Australian Road Assessment Program (AusRAP) follows the iRAP methodology to assess road safety.

iRAP does not publicly release the numerical coefficients that form the safety rating. The coefficients "are proprietary to the iRAP model. The coefficients are embedded in the iRAP software and the RAP Toolkit.
