= AA Ireland =

Irish automotive services organization

AA Ireland Limited
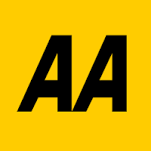
- Industry: Automotive services
- Founded: 1910
- Headquarters: 80 Harcourt Street, Dublin, Ireland
- Area served: Ireland
- Number of employees: 510
- Website: theaa.ie

AA Ireland Limited is an automotive services company in Ireland, founded in 1910. It provides rescue services, personal lines insurance, and travel, technical and information services. The company was formerly part of The AA, the British automobile association, but was separated in 2016 after AA Ireland was sold to Carlyle Cardinal Ireland, and in October 2020, it was sold on to Further Global Capital Management.

== Company and history ==
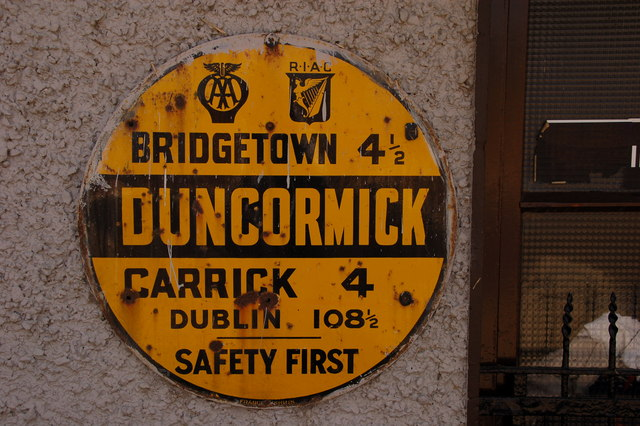
AA roundel (town sign) near to Duncormick, County Wexford, Ireland

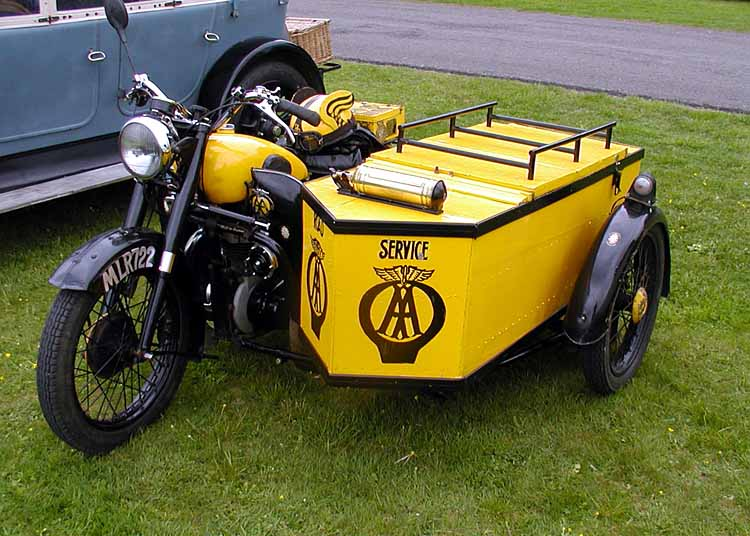
An AA motorcycle sidecar were the same as those used in Ireland.

AA Ireland employs over 500 people and its head office is located at Maryland House, Dublin, with its Rescue Centre based in the city centre and central patrol garage located at Naas Road, Dublin.

AA Ireland was historically part of the same group as The AA in the UK. However, it was sold in August 2016 to the American investment group Carlyle Cardinal Ireland (CCI), separating it from AA plc.

AA Ireland provides emergency rescue for members in their home and on the road, sells insurance for over 225,500 Irish customers and breakdown cover for 300,000. Its branded rescue product, AA Membership, is held by over 300,000 members, giving the AA a market share of 85% in the market for those motorists who choose and purchase rescue cover. Through its breakdown service, The AA attends about 120,000 car break downs every year, with 80% of these being fixed on the spot. The AA also provides breakdown assistance to fifty percent of new cars as part of their warranty, in association with ARC Europe. AA Patrols are located nationwide.

The main AA activities include:

- Vehicle breakdown / rescue service
- Insurance intermediary specialising in motor, home, life, and travel
- Evaluation of second-hand vehicles, and the provision of information to members regarding new cars
- AA Signs Service (provision of temporary directional signage to events)
- AA Approved Service (Car Servicing & Repairing)
- Inspection and grading of Irish Hotels, Guesthouses, B&Bs and tourist accommodation

== AA Roadwatch ==
AA Roadwatch was the major supplier of traffic & travel information in Ireland from its establishment in 1989 until it ended abruptly in 2021. The AA used the Roadwatch brand to supply traffic information through live broadcasts, on RTÉ, Today FM and some local radio stations. It later added online and social media channels.

On 9 July 2021 the AA issued a media statement saying “As of July 10th 2021, The AA will no longer provide AA Roadwatch broadcasts, effective immediately”, although it in fact also cancelled the remaining broadcasts for that day, and its previously-active Twitter account fell largely silent.

== AA Travel Insurance ==
AA Travel Insurance offers a range of travel insurance policies including coverage for flight cancellations, lost or stolen luggage and medical expenses.

The AA offers annual (multi-trip) travel insurance, winter sports cover, backpacker cover, single-trip as well as European breakdown cover.

== Hotel and restaurant grading ==
Alongside its work in the motor and insurance industries, AA Ireland also carries out inspections and gradings of Irish hotels, guesthouses, B&Bs and tourist accommodation. As part of this work, The AA Rosette Scheme is designed to recognise culinary standards demonstrated by AA Accredited properties across Ireland and the UK. The aim of the Rosette system is to provide information for all patrons about where to eat. Rosettes are awarded on a rising scale of 1 to 5.

== AA Ireland App ==
An AA app was first launched in 2013. The app can be used to check AA Roadwatch traffic updates in real time, provides journey planning assistance using AA Routeplanner, and has a "rescue" feature for members to report a breakdown and track the AA Patrol response.

== AA Approved Service ==
The AA Approved Service fix and maintain your car with fixed-price options and upfront communication about repairs. They ensure quality work with a 12-month warranty on parts and labour.

== International links ==
The AA plays a role in international motoring through affiliation with the world's motoring clubs. The AA was a founder member of Alliance Internationale de Tourisme (AIT), whose member clubs represent more than 128 million members worldwide. The AA is also a shareholder in Arc Transistance which provides emergency roadside assistance throughout Europe.

== The European Campaign for Safe Road Design ==
The European Campaign for Safe Road Design was a partnership between 28 European road safety stakeholders that called in 2009 for the EU to invest in safe road infrastructure initiatives, which the group claimed could cut deaths on European roads by 33% in less than a decade. AA Ireland was the campaign's partner in Ireland.
