= Brian Shaw (shipping executive) =

British businessman

- Born: Brian Piers Shaw; 21 March 1933
- Died: 5 February 2011 (aged 77)
- Occupation: Company director

Sir Brian Piers Shaw (21 March 1933 – 5 February 2011) was a British executive who served as chairman of the International Chamber of Shipping (1987–1992), the president of the General Council of British Shipping (1985–1986), and the chairman of the AA during its demutualisation and sale to Centrica in 1998. Shaw was knighted in 1986.
