= Auto-Moto Association of Macedonia =

- Formation: 1945
- Type: Non-profit
- Headquarters: Skopje
- Location: North Macedonia
- Website: amsm.mk

AMSM (Auto - Moto Association of Macedonia) is North Macedonia's largest automobile club, with more than 20,000 members in 2021. It was founded 1945. Through its 14 regional clubs, AMSM covers the entire territory of the Republic of North Macedonia. AMSM provides 24-hour assistance and safe travel home and abroad. AMSM is the only member of the FIA since 1994 and is member of the ARC Europe from 1997 as well.

== History ==
The beginning of Auto - Moto Association of Macedonia is the formation of the first auto - moto associations which started functioning in 1945. The next year, 1946, in North Macedonia there had already been nine associations established, whose basic aim was carrying out operations of public interest for the country citizens. The first associations were established in: Skopje, Kavadarci, Bitola, Kicevo, Kumanovo, Ohrid, Veles, Prilep and Berovo and later associations were also established in Stip and Strumica. Its existence and development are marked through series of structural and organizational changes, some due to the time, and some in response to the need to be and to remain closer to the older and to the new generations.

== AMSM regional clubs ==
- AMD "Gorgi Naumov" - Bitola
- AMD "Vinica" - Vinica
- AMD "Dico Panov" - Gevgelia
- AMD "Strasho Pindzur" - Kavadarci
- AMSM Kicevo - Kicevo
- AMD "Kiro Burnaz" - Kumanovo
- AMD "Fever" - Makedonski Brod
- AMD "Ohrid" - Ohrid
- AMD "Prilepec" - Prilep
- AMD "Probishtip" - Probishtip
- AMD "Struga" - Struga
- AMD "Strela" - Strumica
- AMD "Tetovo" - Tetovo
- AMD "Stip" - Stip

== International campaigns ==
=== Think before you drive ===
AMSM in collaboration with the FIA Foundation supported the international global campaign for road safety Think Before You Drive in 2006. Think Before You Drive is a global road safety initiative of the FIA Foundation, Bridgestone Corporation and motoring clubs worldwide. The Think Before You Drive campaign aims to promote safe driving behaviour and to raise awareness about road safety, locally and globally. The campaign promotes simple road safety messages:

- Highlighting actions that take a few seconds but could save your life
- Identifying the main causes of serious or fatal crashes

=== Make cars green ===
Make Cars Green is an international environmental campaign, aimed at reducing the impact of motoring on our planet, conducted by the Fédération Internationale de l'Automobile - FIA. AMSM in cooperation with the National Security Council on Road Traffic and the Ministry of Internal Affairs of Macedonia launched the global campaign Make cars green on 23 May 2008. The FIA's Make Cars Green campaign aims to help reduce the impact of cars on the environment. The campaign's 10 points for greener motoring encourage motorists to think green before they drive:

- Buy Green
- Plan your journey
- Check tyre pressures frequently
- Reduce loads and avoid the need for roof racks
- Don't warm up your engine before starting off
- Use air conditioning only when necessary
- Accelerate gently and keep your speed constant
- Use engine braking
- Don't idle your engine
- Offset your CO 2 emission

=== UN Decade of action for road safety 2011 - 2020 ===
AMSM in cooperation with the Fédération Internationale de l'Automobile - FIA joined the initiative to support the Decade of Action of the United Nations for Road Safety 2011-2020 officially launched on 11 May 2011. Under the motto "believe, speak, change" AMSM in cooperation with the Ministry of Interior of Macedonia and Republic Council for Road Traffic Safety every year marks the national campaign for road safety in Macedonia. Officially launched on 11 May 2011, the Decade of Action has the official goal of 'stabilising and then reducing' global road traffic fatalities by 2020.

Ten reasons to act on road deaths:

- Nearly 1.3 million people are killed on the world's roads each year
- Up to 50 million people are injured, and many remain disabled for life
- 90% of casualties from road deaths occur in developing countries
- Annual road traffic deaths are forecast to rise to 1.9 million people by 2020
- Road traffic injuries are the number one cause of death for young people worldwide
- By 2015 road traffic injuries will be the leading health burden for children over the age of five years in developing countries
- The economic cost to developing countries is at least $100 billion a year
- Road traffic injuries place an immense burden on hospitals and health systems generally
- Road crashes are preventable
- A global Action Plan includes practical measures which, if implemented, could save millions of lives
