= Logistics UK =

Logistics UK, formerly the Freight Transport Association (FTA) is one of the largest trade associations in the UK, with its more than 18,000 members responsible for the commercial movement of goods, by road, rail, sea, and air. Its mission is to represent the views and interests of its member companies from across the transport industry: from large multinationals and household names to small and medium businesses. Logistics UK is based in Tunbridge Wells.

Logistics UK policy is decided by its members from all modes, through its quarterly regional and national councils. Its national councils include the British Shippers Council, the Rail Freight Council, the Road Freight Council, and the Freight Council.

== History ==
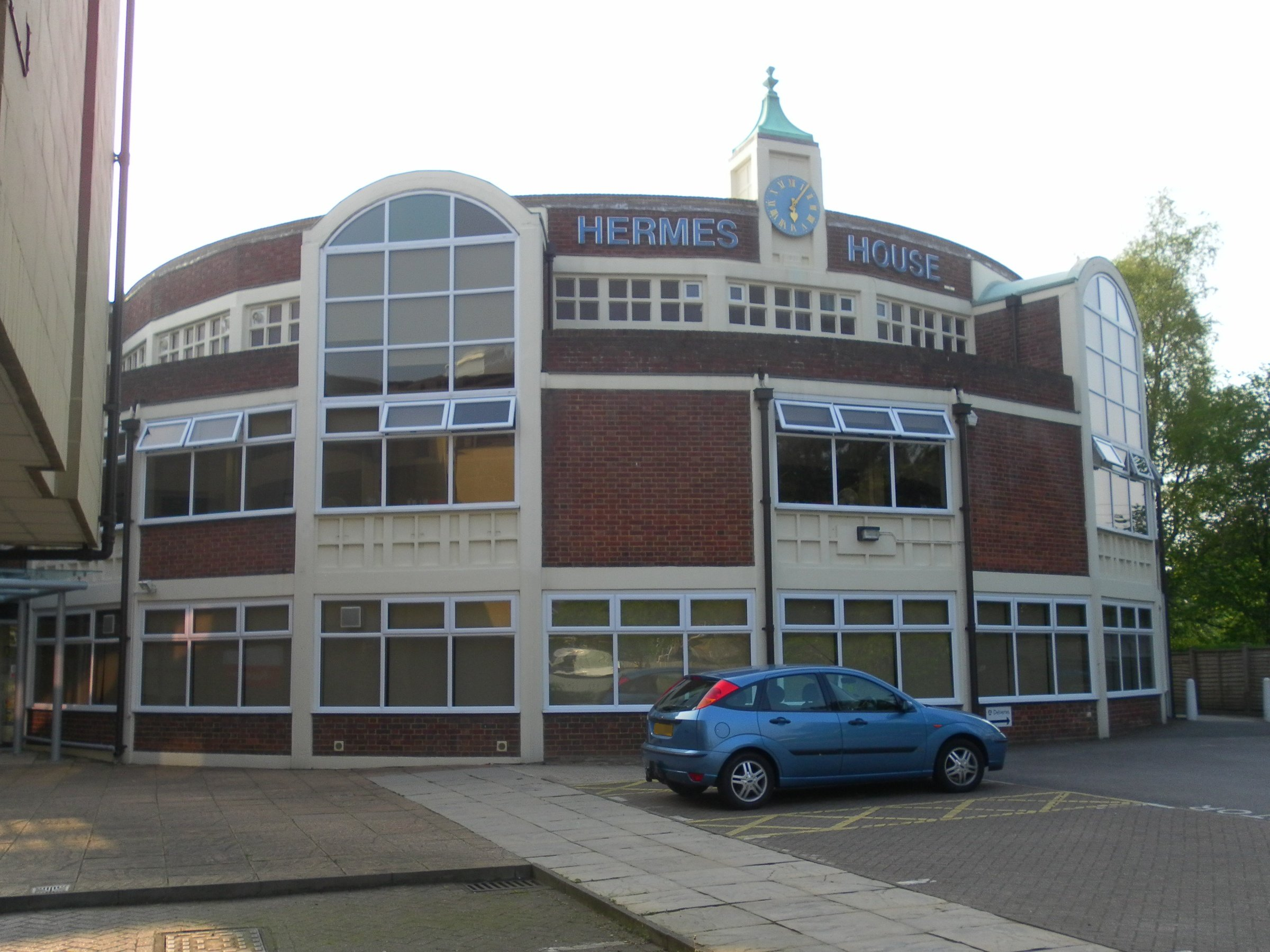
Hermes House in Tunbridge Wells is the Association's headquarters.

Following the 1888 Railway and Canal Traffic Act traders were given a right of complaint to the Board of Trade if they felt that railway rates or services were unreasonable. That resulted in an influential group of traders coming together in July 1889 and creating an organisation called the Mansion House Association on Railway Rates. Amongst its first members were Mr J J Colman of Reckitt & Colman, and Mr Thomas Blackwell of Crosse and Blackwell.

The arrival of the internal combustion engine led to the formation in 1904 of the Motor Van and Wagon Users' Association, which changed its name to the Commercial Motor Users' Union in 1907.

In 1921 the third and final segment of the then FTA was formed: the Traders' Co-ordinating Committee on Transport.

Over the years the work of the Mansion House Association expanded into more road-orientated matters. In 1931 it changed its name to the Mansion House Association on Transport.

In 1944 the Commercial Motor Users' Association decided that each of its constituent sectors needed its own identity and was reformed into three organisations. The own-account sector was separated off and named as the Traders' Road Transport Association.

In 1964 the Mansion House Association changed its name to the National Traders' Traffic Association and finally, in 1969, the three groups — the Traders' Road Transport Association, the Traders' Traffic Association and the Traders' Co-ordinating Committee — joined together to become a new organisation known as the Freight Transport Association.

In 1979 the group was further enlarged: the British Shippers' Council, representing exporters and importers, became a part of FTA.

In 2020, the FTA rebranded itself as Logistics UK. The rebrand was a strategic exercise, aimed at increasing public awareness of the work the (former) FTA carried out and the interests it represented. It was felt that major news organisations and broadcast media favoured the Road Haulage Association (RHA), a competitor trade organisation, when seeking comment on related stories; part of the reason for this was a lack of clarity about who the FTA (as it was previously known) represented.

== Research ==
Logistics UK conducts research and produces in-depth reports on a variety of sectors affecting the logistics industry, which are distributed to members, legislators and policy makers. Of particular note is the annual Logistics Report, which provides a comprehensive overview of the sector, as well as containing research results from member organisations on a number of topics. In addition, the business group produces an annual Skills Report, which examines the recruitment situation across the industry, as well as the Quarterly Transport Activity Survey, which is increasingly used by government and the public policy arena as an economic performance indicator.

== Campaign for Safe Road Design ==
In July 2008 the FTA became a partner in the Campaign for Safe Road Design which called on the UK government to make safe road design a national transport priority.

== Opposition to ban of lorries in rush hour ==
The FTA opposed banning lorries from city centres in rush hour. According to the FTA it would not increase safety.

- It said it would increase the need for vans, to replace lorries.
- Instead there would be an increase in the number of vans (10 vans for 1 lorry) that would make it less safe for cyclists
- It said that government should incentivise replacement by safer vehicles

However, most accidents involving lorries and cyclists do occur at rush hour.

== Opposition to fuel duties ==
The FTA opposed increases to fuel duties (taxes) in 2023 due to the additional costs that the increase would impose on its members.
