= Road safety in Europe =

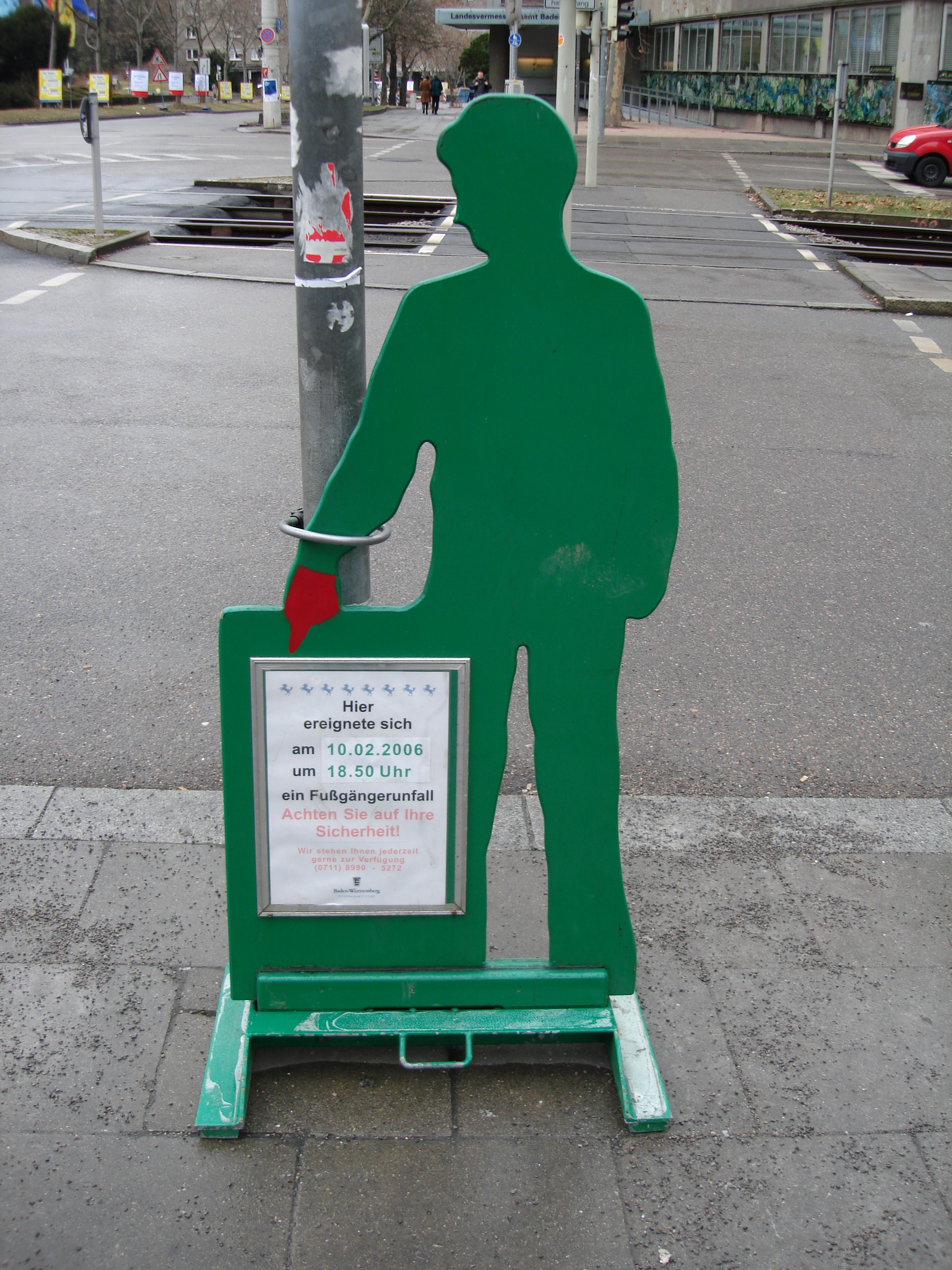
Pedestrian accident location sign in Stuttgart, Germany

Road safety in Europe encompasses transportation safety among road users in Europe, including automobile accidents, pedestrian or cycling accidents, motor-coach accidents, and other incidents occurring within the European Union or within the European region of the World Health Organization (49 countries). Road traffic safety refers to the methods and measures used to prevent road users from being killed or seriously injured.

In 2016, according to the World Health Organisation, road accidents were the eighth-biggest cause of death in the world; deadlier than both diarrhoeal diseases and tuberculosis. Not only is it important to consider road fatalities, but for every fatality on Europe's roads, it is estimated that 4 people will become permanently disabled, 10 will suffer brain or spinal cord damage, 10 people will be seriously injured and 40 will have sustained minor injuries. On top of this, road accidents incur a large economic impact. In Europe alone, it is estimated that the cost to society of road accidents is €130 billion annually. Road accidents and incidents happen for a number of reasons. The main cause of an accident is speed, this is followed by other issues such as driving whilst under the influence of drink or drugs, being distracted at the wheel by mobile devices, in-car radios or personal navigation devices. These risk factors listed here are but a few reasons for road collisions to occur and they demonstrate the myriad of complex factors that are at play for road-safety policy makers.

== Trends and targets ==
Visualization of road traffic deaths (per 100,000 inhabitants) in Europe, by country, between 2000 and 2022.

The European Union (EU) has the safest roads in the world; in which 49 people per million inhabitants died in a road collision in 2018. In the year 2000 over 50,000 people in Europe lost their lives on the roads, by 2009 this number had been reduced to over 35,000; and by 2018 the figure has been reduced further to 25,100, whilst in the same year the number of serious injuries incurred as a result of road collisions was 135,000 people.

The European Commission (EC) has laid out a plan entitled Vision Zero which endeavours to reduce the incidence of road induced fatalities to a rate of zero by the year 2050. In order to be able to achieve their long-term ambition of zero deaths on Europe's roads, the Commission implemented a road safety strategy, The Road Safety Programme, in which they aimed to halve the number of fatalities caused by road accidents and incidents between 2011 and 2020. As of 2018, European Union member states are far from this target, since there has only been a 20% reduction in road fatalities, which makes the target of a 50% reduction by 2020 now seem implausible.

In 2021, the European Investment Bank signed an agreement with the United Nations Economic Commission for Europe to strengthen collaboration in the fields of road safety and climate resilient transport infrastructure.

View source data.
- European Union: Source European Union
- European Union:, 2019 Early estimates
- United States: Source OCDE/ITF for 1990, 2000 and 2010–2015 period (killed after 30 days)
- United States: Source NHTSA (2007–2019).

The Commissioner of Transport of the EU considers road safety as a key European success story.

== Various geographical safety organizations ==
=== World Health Organization ===
The World Health Organization issued a European Status Report on road safety.

Ninety per cent of WHO countries have a safety agency operating with their respective transport ministries, except in CIS countries where the topic falls under the interior minister.

=== From an EU perspective ===
Road safety policy making in the EU falls jointly on the European institutions and member states; and it is the European Commission (EC) which has a particularly important role in overseeing road safety policy across the Union. This is because it has oversight over product standards and regulations, as well as certain aspects of infrastructure development and management. Road safety is based upon the EU principle of subsidiarity: national and local authorities are responsible for most decisions, including enforcement and awareness-raising, while the EU operates a general framework for improved road safety via legislation and recommendations e.g. introducing minimum safety requirements for the Trans-European Transport Networks, and technical requirements for the transport of dangerous goods.

The EU publishes various legal texts regarding road safety.

=== European Road Safety NGOs ===
The European Transport Safety Council is an NGO based in Brussels. It aims to reduce the numbers of deaths and injuries in transport in Europe. The Council reported an increase in fatalities in most European countries in 2015.

== Definitions ==
=== Definition of a fatal road accident ===
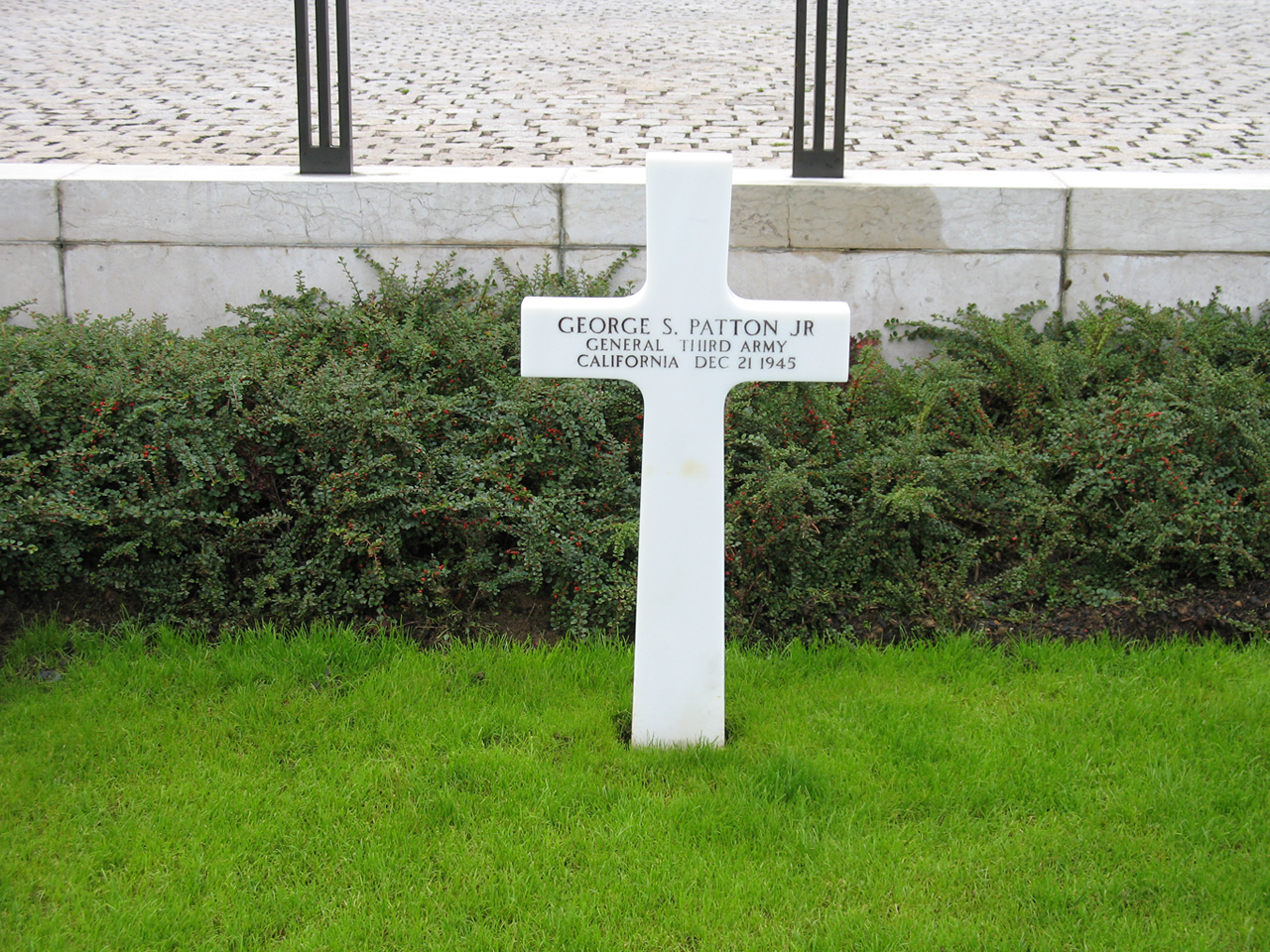
U.S. Army General George S. Patton's grave in Luxembourg City: On December 8, 1945, while still in Europe, while upon going to an invitation of Patton's chief of staff, Major General Hobart Gay, his car collided with an American army truck at low speed.

The 1968 Vienna Convention on Road Traffic defines a fatal road accident as an accident in which a person dies of their injuries at the scene or within thirty days. This definition has been adopted across most EU countries.

Some countries have applied this definition retrospectively where possible. For instance, until 2004 France counted its killed at six days, but in an effort to enable comparison with neighboring countries a multiplicative coefficient 1.057 was used up to 2004 and 1.069 since 2005 to convert the killed at six days into killed at thirty days, before France adopted the international definition in 2005.

=== Injuries ===
Each year road crashes generate about 120,000 fatalities and 2.4 million injuries in the European region of the World Health Organization. Road traffic injuries are the leading cause of death among adolescents and young adults.

In 2015, the European Commission published a figure for the number of people seriously injured on Europe's roads: 135,000 people in 2014. To obtain this figure all countries of the EU needed to align on a common standardized medical definition of what constitutes a serious road injury.

In Europe, for every person killed in traffic crashes, many more suffer serious injuries with life-changing consequences. By lack of common methodology to compare serious injuries, (Note: Old police methodology differed, and it is still too early to use the new one MAIS3+ definition based on hospital data) serious injuries are not counted the same way in each country. European Commission estimates 120 000 people are seriously injured. That is like with one lost life; five additional people are seriously injured.

For seriously injured people in Belgium, Finland and Lithuania, there are 36% of car occupants, 24% of cyclists, 20% of PTW, 14% of pedestrians, en 7% remaining.

Serious injuries are more costly to society because of the long-term rehabilitation and healthcare needed. Vulnerable road users, such as pedestrians, cyclists, motorcyclists or elderly road users, are especially concerned.

Between 2010 and 2018, between 206 and 222 thousands serious injured were counted yearly for 23 EU members

=== Other issues ===
The level of transport-related air pollution is also a major public health concern in most countries of Europe.

== Main road casualties indicators ==
Fatality rates in 2017 (in fatality per population) source Europa.eu Legend: < 35 killed/M < < 55 killed/M < < 65 killed/M < < 80 killed/M < < 100 killed/M (in killed per million inhabitants)

Many differences between countries are linked to demography, development level and population density. According to Siem Oppe of the SWOW a learning behavior appears in the changes in the level of fatalities over time:

- In the poorest countries, there are few trips and less public transport. Motorized road traffic is low and the rate of fatalities by million inhabitants is very low (fewer than 30).
- Development of car use leads to a sharp increase in traffic and consequently increases accident numbers, and the ratio killed per million inhabitants in less poor countries passes 200.
- On the other hand, the richest countries experience a lot of congestion and have more developed transport and road safety policies. Drivers' behaviour is more cautious, and the ratio killed falls to less than 80 killed per million inhabitants.

European Union Road Safety Facts and Figures
Country	Area (thousands of km^{2})	Population in 2018	GDP per capita in 2018	Population density (inhabitants per km^{2}) in 2017	Vehicle ownership (per thousand inhabitants) in 2016	Road Network Length (in km) in 2013	Total Road Deaths in 2018	Road deaths per Million Inhabitants in 2018	Number of People Killed per Billion km	Number of Seriously Injured in 2017/2018
Austria	83.9	8,822,267	38,000	107	665	124,115	409	45	5.2 (2015–2017)	7,664 (2017)
Belgium	30.5	11,398,589	35,300	376	585	155,210	590	52	n/a	3,757 (2017)
Bulgaria	111.0	7,050,034	6,500	65	516	19,678	611	88	n/a	8,680 (2018)
Croatia	56.5	4,105,493	11,500†^{a}	74	416	26,820	317	77	12.7 (2016–2018)	2.776 (2018)
Cyprus	9.3	864,236	23,300	128	726	9,765	49	57	n/a	348 (2018)
Czech Republic	78.9	10,610,055	17,600	137	570	130,680	656	62	10.1 (2015–2015)	2,395 (2018)
Denmark	42.9	5,781,190	47,600	137	508	74,130	175	30	3.7 (2016–2018)	1,756 (2017)
Estonia	45.2	1,319,133	15,100	30	620	58,787	67	51	5.7 (2016–2018)	460 (2018)
Finland	338.4	5,513,130	36,600	18	732	78,093	225	43	4.7 (2014–2016)	409 (2017)
France	632.8	66,926,166	32,800	123	590	1,071,823	3,265	48	5.8 (2015–2017)	27,732 (2017)
Germany	357.3	82.792,351	35,900	237	610	230,377†^{b}	3,177	39	4.3 (2015–2017)	67,913 (2018)
Greece	132.0	10,741,165	17,800	83	605	117,321	690	64	n/a	706 (748)
Hungary	93.0	9,778,371	12,500	108	394	203,310	629	64	n/a	5,496 (2018)
Ireland (Republic of Ireland)	69.8	4,830,392	59,400	70	525	96,017	146	31	3.5 (2015–2017)	966†^{d}
Italy	302.1	60,483,973	26,700	206	707	256,039	3,310	55	6.5 (2015–2017)	17,309 (2017) †^{e}
Latvia	64.6	1,934,379	12,300	31	387	70,443	143	78	12.1 (2015–2017)	542 (2018)
Lithuania	65.3	2,808,901	13,300	45	501	72,591	170	61	n/a	81 (2018)
Luxembourg	2.6	602,005	80,800	245	740	2,880	36	60	n/a	256 (2017)
Malta	0.3	475,701	21,600	1,462	726	203,310	18	38	6.6 (2016–2017)	317 (2018)
Netherlands	41.5	17,181,084	41,500	508	543	138,641	678	31	4.7 (2015–2017)	20,800 (2017)
Poland	312.7	37,976,687	12,400	124	672	415,122	2,862	76	14.6 (2013–2015)	10,963 (2018)
Portugal	92.2	10,291,027	17,900	112	479	14,310†^{c}	606	59	8.5 (2016–2018)	1,974 (2018)
Romania	238.4	19,530,631	8,700	85	329	85,531	1,867	96	n/a	8,144 (2018)
Slovakia	49.0	5,443,120	15,600	113	455	54,806	229	46	n/a	1,127 (2017)
Slovenia	20.3	2,066,880	20,200	103	587	38,874	91	44	6.6 (2014–2016)	821 (2018)
Spain	506.0	46,658,447	25,000	93	611	666 415	1,806	39	n/a	9,546 (2017)
Sweden	438.6	10,120,242	43,300	25	542	216,976	324	32	3.4 (2016–2018)	4,200 (2018)
United Kingdom	248.5	66,273,576	32,400	273	544	421,127	1,825	28	3.4 (2016–2018) GB Data Only	25,609 (2017)
EU 28 Total (European Union)	4,463.4	512,379,225	28,200	121	587	4,852,242	25,249	49	5.8 (no date range available)	233, 285 (overall aggregate)

†^{a} Data only available for 2017

†^{b} Data not available for "Other Roads" Category in source

†^{c} Data not available for "Other Roads" Category in source

†^{d} Data only available for 2016

†^{e} Data for MAIS3+ certification

Mortality within Europe, per million inhabitants in 2013
View source data.
Source: Eurostat

Nationals means do not show local variations, so in 2015, NUTS regions with the lower fatality ratio per million inhabitants, are Stockholm (6), Vienna (7), Hamburg and Oslo (11), Berlin (14) and East Sweden (15). The same year, other regions have a worst fatality ratio such as the Luxembourg province of Belgium (210) and Kastamonu in Turkey (192).

UK position

Mortality in UK is rather reduced compared with the EU.

Les moyennes nationales ne reflètent pas les variations locales, ainsi en 2015, les régions NUTS ayant la mortalité routière la plus faible, par million d'habitants, sont Stokholm (6), Viennes (7), Hambourg et Oslo (11), Berlin (14) et Ostra Verige (15). La même année, les régions les plus meurtrières sont la province de Luxembourg en Belgique (210) et Kastamonu en Turquie (192).

The "per 10 billion pkm" indicator is based on an estimated value due to missing vkm indicator. In 2016, the indicator range from 23 for Sweden to 192 for Romania, with a 52 value for 28-EU. Germany, France, UK and Italy ranks 33, 46, 28, and 44, respectively.

Killed, EU, pkm, 2016
View source data.
source Eurostat

== Transportation mode effect ==
Car drivers and their passengers formed the greatest proportion of road fatalities in 2013 at 45%, followed by pedestrians at 22%. These vary considerably between nations with high levels of fatalities for motorcycles where their use is more common, linked to the climate of Mediterranean countries.

Road accident fatalities by category of vehicles as of 2013
1. Cars & taxis (44.7%)
2. Light goods vehicles (3.10%)
3. HGV (1.70%)
4. Buses & coaches (0.60%)
5. Bicycles (7.80%)
6. Mopeds (2.90%)
7. Motorcycles (15.0%)
8. Pedestrians (21.9%)
9. Other (2.30%)

In the world and within the European Union (28 members), mortality depends upon modal transportation:

Tués
View source data.	View source data.
World source: OMS, Global status report on road safety 2015; EU source: EC

=== Transport safety (modal comparison) ===
Transport mode	Traveller fatalities per 100 million passenger-kilometres (EU-15)		View source data.
	1999	2001–2002	View source data.
M-bike	16	13,8	View source data.
Foot	7.5	6.4	View source data.
Bike	6.3	5.4	View source data.
Car	0.8	0.7	View source data.
Small boat	0.33	0.25	View source data.
Bus & coach	0.08	0.07	View source data.
Air (civil aviation)	0.08	0.035	View source data.
Train	0.04	0.050	View source data.

Transport mode	Traveller fatalities per 100 million passenger-hours (EU15)		View source data.
	1999	2001–2002	View source data.
M-bike	500	440	View source data.
Bike	90	75	View source data.
Foot	30	25	View source data.
Car	30	25	View source data.
Air (civil aviation)	36.5	16	View source data.
Small boat	10.5	8	View source data.
Train	3	3	View source data.
Bus & coach	2	2	View source data.

=== Rating roads for safety ===
Since 1999 the EuroRAP initiative has been assessing major roads in Europe with a road protection score. This results in a star rating for roads based on how well its design would protect car occupants from being severely injured or killed if a head-on, run-off, or intersection accident occurs, with four stars representing a road with the best survivability features. The scheme states it has highlighted thousands of road sections across Europe where road users are routinely maimed and killed for want of safety features, sometimes for little more than the cost of safety fencing or the paint required to improve road markings.

There are plans to extend the measurements to rate the probability of an accident for the road. These ratings are being used to inform planning and authorities' targets. For example, in Britain two thirds of all road deaths in Britain happen on rural roads, which score badly when compared with the high-quality motorway network; single carriageways claim 80% of rural deaths and serious injuries, while 40% of rural car occupant casualties are in cars that hit roadside objects, such as trees. Improvements in driver training and safety features for rural roads are hoped to reduce this statistic.

The number of designated traffic officers in the UK fell from 15 to 20% of police force strength in 1966 to seven per cent of force strength in 1998, and between 1999 and 2004 by 21%. It is an item of debate whether the reduction in traffic accidents per 100 million miles driven over this time has been due to robotic enforcement.

== Law ==
=== EU law ===
EU Directive 2008/96/EC on Road Infrastructure Safety Management (RISM), adopted on 19 November 2008, provides for the introduction of road safety impact assessments (RSIA) in the process of designing a new road or major road layout change. As defined by the directive, a RSIA is "a strategic comparative analysis of the impact of a new road or a substantial modification to the existing network on the safety performance of the road network". Transposition into member state law was mandated by 19 December 2010: it was transposed into Irish law under SI 472 of 2011.

Road safety within tunnels on the Trans-European road network is specifically managed separately, within the 2004 directive on minimum safety requirements for such tunnels.

In 2018 the European Commission presented a proposal to amend the EU RISM directive with a view to reducing road fatalities and serious injuries on EU road networks, by improving the safety performance of road infrastructure. The amendment was adopted in November 2019.

The European Union has other legal texts regarding Driving License, Enforcement in the field of road safety, Alcohol, Drugs and Medicine, Professional Drivers – Training, Professional Drivers – Working Conditions, Professional Drivers – Tachographs, Professional Drivers – Check of the working Conditions, Third Countries Driver Attestation, Vehicles – type approval, Vehicle – Registration, Vehicle – Technical Control, Vehicle – Front Protection of Vulnerable Users, Vehicle – Safety Belts and other Restraints Systems of Vulnerable Users, Vehicle – Tyres, Vehicle – Daytime Running Lights, Vehicle – Blind Spot Mirrors, Vehicle – Conspicuity, Vehicle – Speed limitation Devices, Vehicle – Weights and Dimensions, Transport of Dangerous Goods – Weights and Dimensions, Road Infrastructure, Emergency Calls, Accident Data Collection, and Unit of Measurement: see also Directive 80/1269/EEC, European driving license, European emission standards, and End of Life Vehicles Directive.

=== National (local) laws ===
European countries usually have laws regarding speed control, drinking and driving, helmets, seat belts and child car restraints. Most countries have laws regarding one or another concern, but less than a third of countries have laws and control for each of them.

=== Drink driving limits ===
Blood Alcohol Content limits for drivers in Europe, measured in grams per litre of blood
Country	Standard limit	Limit for commercial drivers	Limit for novice drivers
Austria	0.5	0.1	0.1
Belgium	0.5	0.2	0.5
Bulgaria	0.5	0.5	0.5
Croatia	0.5	0.5	0.5
Cyprus	0.5	0.2	0.2
Czech Republic	0	0	0
Denmark	0.5	0.5	0.5
Estonia	0.2	0.2	0.2
Finland	0.5	0.5	0.5
France	0.5	0.5 (0.2 for bus drivers)	0.2
Germany	0.5	0	0
Greece	0.5	0.2	0.2
Hungary	0	0	0
Ireland	0.5	0.2	0.2
Italy	0.5	0	0
Latvia	0.5	0.5	0.2
Lithuania	0.4	0	0
Luxembourg	0.5	0.2	0.2
Malta	0.5	0.2	0.2
Netherlands	0.5	0.5	0.2
Poland	0.2	0.2	0.2
Portugal	0.5	0.2	0.2
Romania	0	0	0
Slovakia	0	0	0
Slovenia	0.5	0	0
Spain	0.5	0.3	0.3
Sweden	0.2	0.2	0.2
Switzerland	0.5	0.1	0.1
United Kingdom (i)	0.8	0.8	0.8
(i) Scotland	0.5	0.5	0.5

Source: https://etsc.eu/blood-alcohol-content-bac-drink-driving-limits-across-europe

== Safety awards ==
In 2018, Ireland wins the PIN award 2019, is the best performer of the European Union for traffic safety, with 30 deaths per million inhabitants. not counting the withdrawing United Kingdom. It is also the second member of the EU for deaths per billion vehicle-km, with a rate of 3.5, not as good as the rate 3.4 for Sweden, not counting the withdrawing United Kingdom.

Ireland actions to improve safety included fighting against drunk driving, drunk pedestrian, drunk motorcyclist, and speeding motorcyclists.

== Local specificities ==
=== EU-27 differences ===
In the European Union differences exist from country to country.

For instance, Germany, Spain and the Netherlands only have 5387 fatalities in 2019, that is 24 % of EU fatalities for 33% of the population in 2017. This means this group of three populated countries performs better than the whole EU.

At the opposite, Poland, Bulgaria and Romania have 5401 fatalities in 2019, that is 24 % of EU fatalities also, but for only 15% of the population in 2017.

While those six countries together make 48% of EU population and 48% of EU fatalities, rate of fatalities per population is 120 % higher in the second group of three countries than in the better group.

Between both groups, France and Italy together have 6417 fatalities the same year, that is 28 % of EU fatalities for 29% of the population in 2017. This makes rate of fatalities per population in this third group is 33 % higher in this third group of countries than in the better group.

Those eight countries together make 77% of EU population and 76% of EU fatalities. The last quarter would group the 19 other EU countries which also have good and poor performers but with a smaller weight in the EU performance.

=== Non EU countries with accession negotiation status ===
Road fatalities in the Western Balkans claimed nearly 1 300 lives in 2022, according to a speech made at the 7th UN Global Road Safety Week in June 2023. In Serbia alone, 553 persons died in road accidents in 2022, with a total of 30 000 lives lost in the previous 30 years. Serbia has had significant progress in road safety, with a 27% drop in fatalities between 2011 and 2021, but the country does continue to have a greater proportion of road traffic deaths per 100,000 people than the EU average. The EU average is 5.1.

=== UK regions ===
Compared mortality in UK NUTS 1 regions.

Mortality in UK NUTS 1 regions 2015
View source data.
source Eurostat

== Expenditure ==
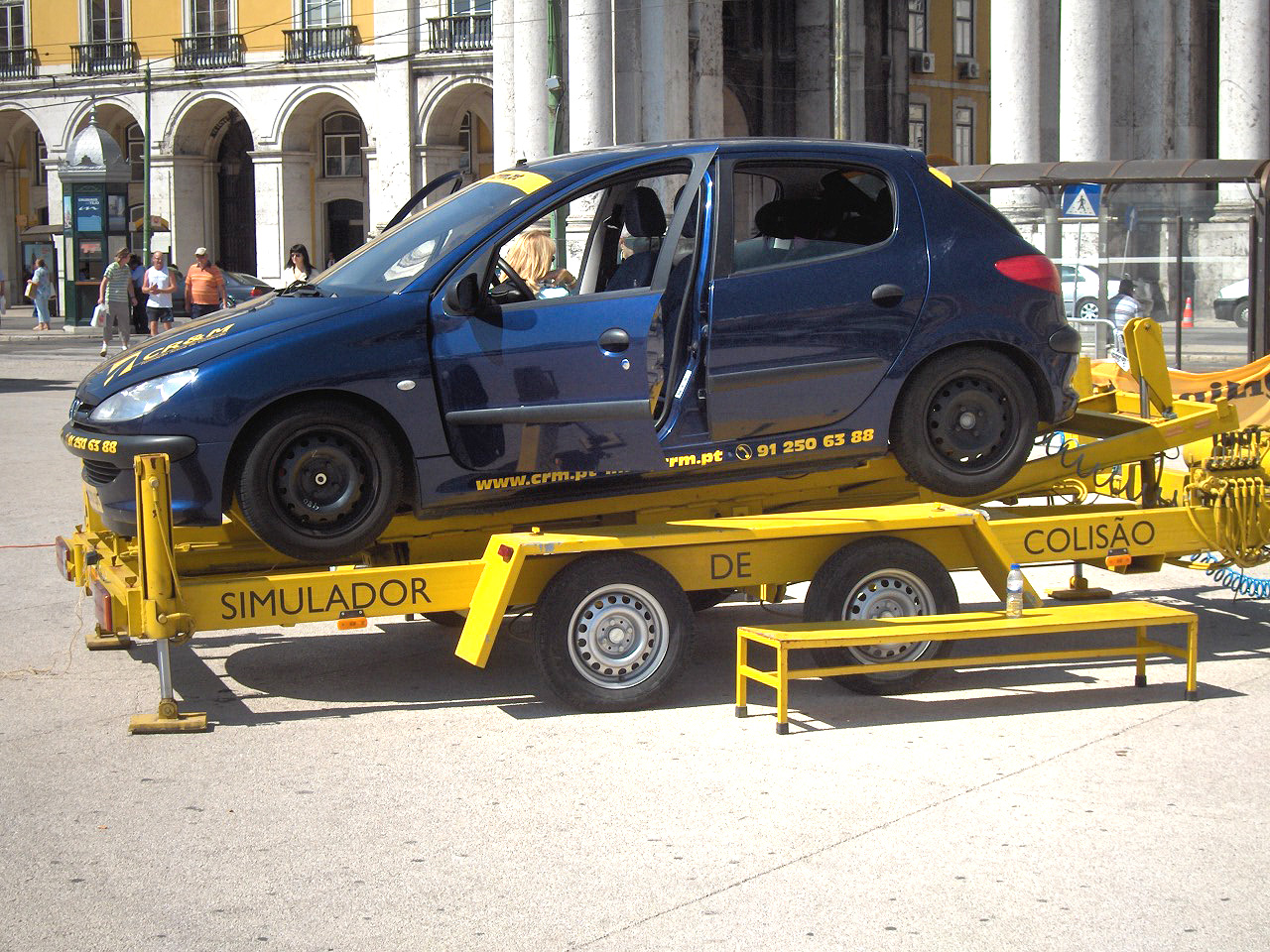
Simulator Lisbon, Portugal

In Europe, expenditure for traffic safety is far less than the costs of road traffic injuries.

== Miscellaneous ==
Project EDWARD is the biggest Europe-wide awareness and enforcement campaign on road safety.

The goal of the project European Day Without A Road Death (Project EDWARD) is that nobody dies on the roads of Europe on Wednesday 19 September 2018. In 2018, project EDWARD reached a score of 37.2 million on the Twitter social media.

The fourth edition occurred on 26 September 2019.

That day, 52 people were killed on the European roads, a few less than the daily 70 killed per day. In eleven EU countries, nobody was killed that day.

The keyword used on social media for this campaign is the word #ProjectEDWARD.

Next EDWARD day is planned on 16 September 2020.

On 17 September 2020 was set the roadpol safety day. That day, 34 people dies on the European roads of 26 participating countries out of 27. 16 countries had zero deaths that day, while 10 countries had had at least one death. Spain, Poland and Romania had more than 5.

== See also ==
- European Campaign for Safe Road Design
- List of countries by traffic-related death rate
- Transportation safety in the United States
