= Campaign for Safe Road Design =

British road safety campaign

The Campaign for Safe Road Design was a British partnership launched in 2008 between 13 UK major road safety stakeholders that is called for the UK Government to invest in a safe road infrastructure which in their view could cut deaths on British roads by 33%.

== Aims ==
The key points of the Campaign were:

- Safe road design will cut road deaths and injuries by a third
- 10,000 fewer deaths and serious injuries saves GBP6billion a year
- Safe road design gives the economy its best rate of return
- Government must build safe road design into 10-year plan

== Background ==
In 2008, the campaign stated that recent years the UK had fallen behind other European countries in terms of road deaths. In the last 10 years 375,000 have been killed or seriously injured on Britain's roads.

It was estimated that a formal safe road infrastructure programme in the UK could reduce the number of accidents on Britain's roads by a third. However, there was poor public appreciation in the UK of the role that safe road design had in reducing road casualties. The Campaign cite research into this subject undertaken by EuroRAP across three EU countries which found that in the UK only 20% of respondents thought that safe roads would save the most lives, whereas in Sweden and Netherlands the figure was as much as 37%.

== Partners ==
The Campaign was led by 13 key stakeholders in UK road safety. They are: AA, County Surveyors Society, EuroRAP, Freight Transport Association, IAM Motoring Trust, Chartered Institution of Highways and Transportation, Institute of Highway Engineers, PACTS, Prince Michael International Road Safety Award, RAC Foundation, Road Haulage Association, Road Safe, and the Road Safety Foundation.

== European expansion ==
The UK Campaign for Safe Road Design proved to be a success having influenced the UK Department for Transport to support the increase of EuroRAP risk rate mapping to the wider road network in the UK. Following this success EuroRAP had organised a European Campaign for Safe Road Design along the lines of the UK campaign. The European campaign featured 28 partners across Europe and aimed to influence the EC to use Safe Road Infrastructure Initiatives to cut casualties by 50,000 a year for the next decade, which is the equivalent of €50 billion over the decade or 0.5% of GDP.
