= The AA =

British motoring association

AA Limited
- Trade name: The AA
- Formerly: Fizzbay Limited (9–25 Jun 2004); Beta Top Co Limited (June–October 2004); AA Top Co Limited (2004–2006); AA Limited (2006–2014); AA plc (2014–2021)
- Type: Private limited company
- Industry: Automotive services
- Founded: 1905
- Founder: Walter Gibbons
- Headquarters: Basingstoke, England, UK
- Revenue: £995 million (2020)
- Operating income: £257 million (2020)
- Net income: £107 million (2020)
- Number of employees: 7,454 (2017)
- Parent: TowerBrook Capital Partners; Warburg Pincus
- Website: theaa.com

AA Limited, trading as The AA, is a British motoring association based in Basingstoke, England.

Founded in 1905, it provides vehicle insurance, driving lessons, breakdown cover, loans, motoring advice, road maps and other services. The association demutualised in 1999, to become a private limited company, and from 2014 a public limited company (PLC). In 2002 the AA Motoring Trust was created to continue its public interest and road safety activities.

In 2021, a consortium led by Tower Brook Capital Partners and Warburg Pincus completed the acquisition of AA Limited (formerly known as AA PLC).

== History ==
=== Charitable association ===
The Automobile Association was founded in 1905 by William John Bosworth, to help motorists avoid police speed traps, in response to the Motor Car Act 1903 which introduced new penalties for breaking the speed limit, for reckless driving with fines, endorsements and the possibility of jail for speeding and other driving offences. The act also required drivers to hold a driving licence (which was obtained without a test on payment of five shillings at a post office) and to display a registration plate on their vehicle.

By 1906, the AA had erected thousands of roadside danger and warning signs, and managed road signage until responsibility was passed to local authorities in the early 1930s. By 1926, the organisation had installed 6,500 direction signs, and 15,000 village signs, most of which were removed during the Second World War. In 1908, the organisation published its first AA Members' Special Handbook containing a list of nationwide agents and repairers.

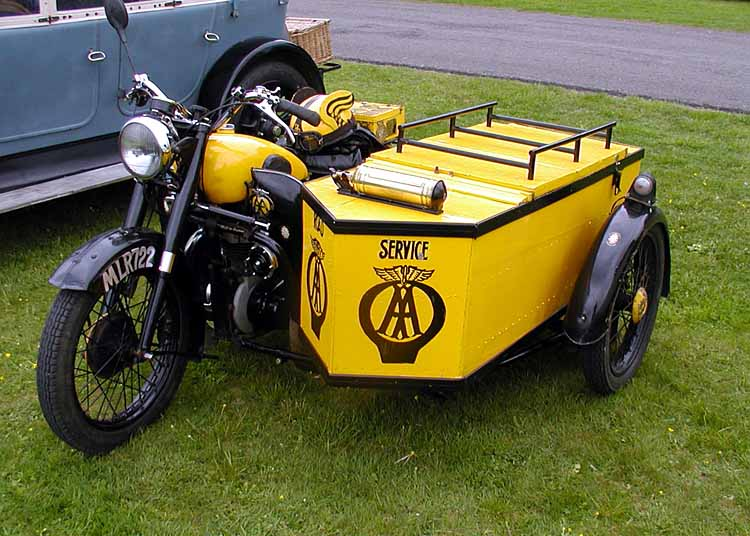
A former AA BSA patrol bike from 1951

In 1910, in a legal test case (Betts vs. Stevens) involving an AA patrolman and a potentially speeding motorist, the Chief Justice, Lord Alverston, ruled that where a patrolman signals to a speeding driver to slow down and thereby avoid a speed trap, then they would have committed the offence of 'obstructing an officer in the course of his duty' under the Prevention of Crimes Amendment Act 1885. The organisation then introduced a coded warning system, used until the 1960s, whereby an AA patrolman would salute the driver of a passing car which showed a visible AA Badge unless there was a speed trap nearby, on the understanding that their officers could not be prosecuted for failing to salute. The AA Handbook stated that "It cannot be too strongly emphasised that when a patrol fails to salute, the member should stop and ask the reason why, as it is certain that the patrol has something of importance to communicate."

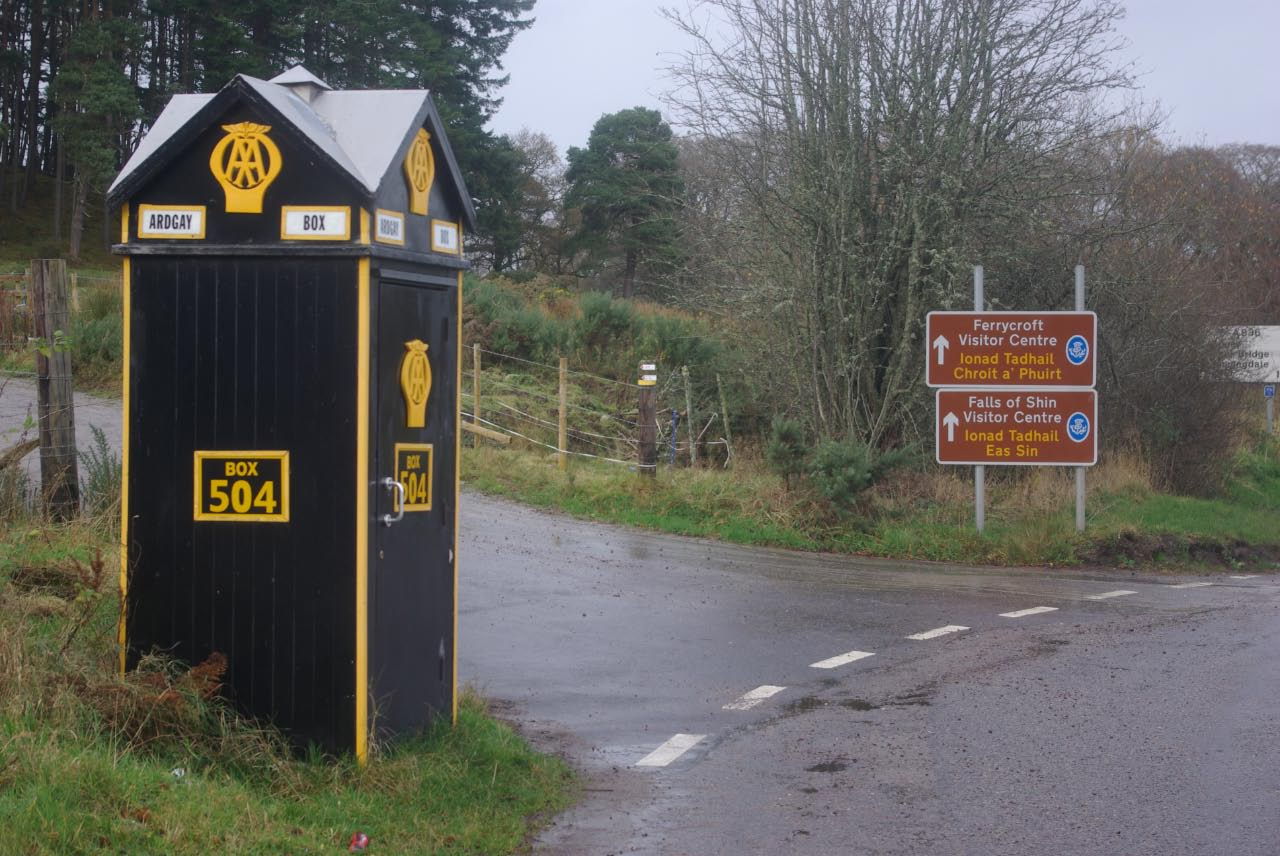
AA phone box

In 1910, the organisation introduced AA Routes and in 1912, began inspecting hotels and restaurants, issuing AA Star Classification to those deemed to be of sufficient quality and introduced pre-purchase and post-accident repair checks in the 1920s. In 1920 members were issued with keys to wooden roadside telephone boxes which could be used to call the organisation for assistance (the boxes had been erected from 1912 as shelters for watchmen or patrolmen). There were almost 1,000 boxes in their heyday, and they remained in use until the 1960s.

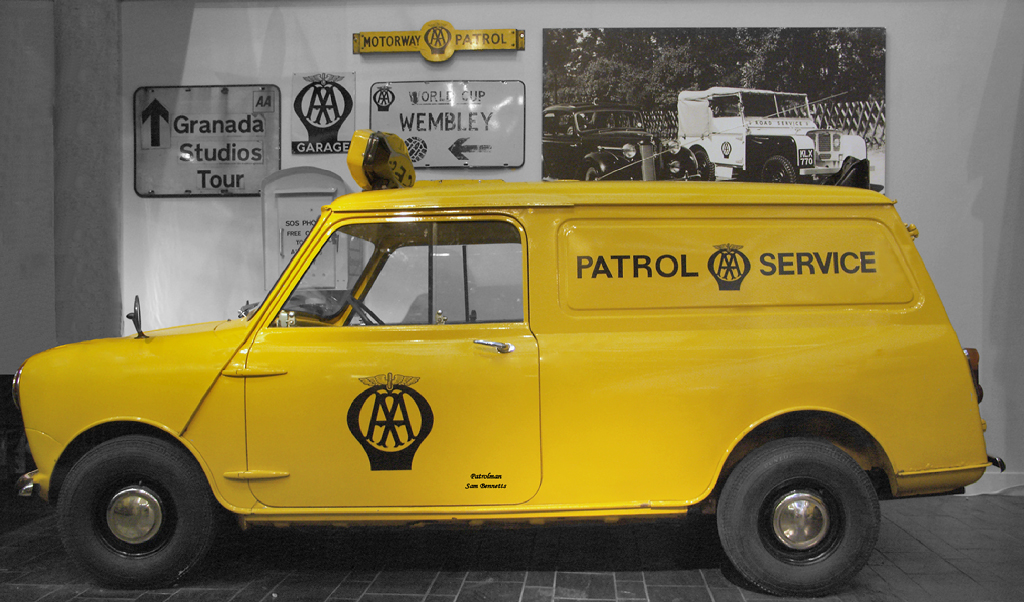
Automobile Association roadside assistance BMC Minivan

After the war, the AA led protests against petrol rationing, which was repealed in 1950. 1949 saw the launch of a night-time breakdown and recovery service, initially in London only, then extended nationwide. The AA Insurance brokerage service was started in 1967. The organisation campaigned for the compulsory wearing of seat belts, and for the introduction of unleaded petrol. Seat belt legislation became law in the United Kingdom on 1 January 1983 with the Transport Act 1981. The AA has lobbied successive governments over what they describe as 'unfair motoring taxes'.

In February 1972, the AA relocated from its central London offices to Basingstoke. In the following year it began broadcasting AA Roadwatch traffic reports on commercial radio stations. AA Relay was also introduced in 1973, a service that will deliver a broken-down vehicle, its driver and passengers, luggage and trailer to anywhere in Britain.

==== Member criticism ====
In 1998, as a result of enquiries by James Birkin, an AA member, it emerged that members had the right to stand for election to the executive committee, which had never happened. At that time, the committee had the right to veto those standing and had always appointed members. Birkin stood for the committee in 1998, having first issued a press release reported in the London Evening Standard highly critical of the way the system operated. He was duly vetoed by the committee and a member was appointed. Criticism of the committee of behaving like a "self-perpetuating oligarchy" followed the May 1998 annual meeting. Chairman Sir Brian Shaw was also criticised for saying that members who were unhappy with this arrangement could "vote with their feet".

=== For profit company ===
The association demutualised in July 1999 to become a private limited company, which was bought later the same year by Centrica (owners of British Gas and Scottish Gas). Centrica sold the AA in July 2004 to two private equity firms, CVC and Permira, which in July 2007 merged the AA with Saga under Acromas Holdings.

In 2006, CVC and Permira were accused by Labour MP Gwyn Prosser in the House of Commons of "greed" and "blatant asset stripping" of the AA "to borrow £500m on the basis of the AA's assets in order to pay themselves a dividend." The AA responded that they were "happy to have a reasoned conversation with Mr Prosser."

In July 2013, the company launched AA Cars, linking buyers and sellers of used cars. The service is a partnership with Vcars, rebranding its partner's existing online service and providing a check of the car's history. At the time of rebranding, over 110,000 cars were available for purchase via 2,000 registered dealers.

The AA became listed on the London Stock Exchange as AA plc in June 2014, through an initial public offering in which Acromas sold all its shares. In September 2015, the AA acquired the garage-booking service Motoriety. In that year, the AA had around 3,000 patrol staff.

Bob Mackenzie was Executive Chairman from June 2014, having led the buy out from Acromas, until August 2017 when he was removed for "gross misconduct". He was replaced by Simon Breakwell as Acting Chief Executive, and John Leach as Chairman.

In July 2015, the AA added more than 500 Volkswagen Transporter vans to their patrol fleet. More vans were ordered in February 2017.

The organisation had operated in Ireland from 1910. The AA Ireland business was sold to Carlyle Cardinal Ireland Fund and Carlyle Global Financial Services Partners in June 2016. The company stated that it had 3.3 million paying members in the first half of 2017.

The company accepted a takeover offer from a consortium of TowerBrook Capital Partners and Warburg Pincus in November 2020. The sale was completed in March 2021 with the company delisted from the London Stock Exchange.

=== Divisions and brands ===
The AA operates several different divisions and brands, including:

- The AA (breakdown cover, various insurance products, financial services products, motoring-related products)
- Beam, a specialist insurance brand for price comparison websites launched in 2022
- The British School Of Motoring (BSM), a driving school it acquired that was previously owned by rival RAC
- DriveTech, which provides driver training for companies and to individuals referred by the Police

=== Offices and physical estate ===
The AA has streamlined its property estate over time, with its new main headquarters opening at Plant, Basingstoke in December 2024. The business also maintains a call centre in Cheadle, Stockport and manages its patrol force of roadside mechanics from an operations centre in Oldbury near Birmingham. Additionally, a number of marketing, finance and digital functions operate from a London office, firstly at 90 Long Acre in Covent Garden, and from 2021 at the Blue Fin Building near the River Thames.

The AA Driving School, which includes the AA and BSM driving school brands, is based in offices in Cardiff.

The AA's publishing arm, AA Publishing, is based in separate offices in Basingstoke.

=== Continuing charities ===
The AA Foundation for Road Safety Research was created by the AA in 1986. In 2002, the AA Motoring Trust charity was created to continue the AA's public interest and road safety activities; its responsibilities were transferred to the IAM Motoring Trust, under the Institute of Advanced Motorists, at the end of 2006. The AA Charitable Trust for Road Safety and the Environment was established in 2008. It has conducted successful campaigns such as Think Bikes, Caitlin's Campaign, Driver Distraction and #BuckleUp.

== AA ratings and awards ==
=== Hotels, guest accommodation, and self catering accommodation ===
The AA awards ratings according to a system based on quality standards, agreed by the AA and the various tourist authorities in the United Kingdom. Properties are awarded a star rating, from one to five stars. In addition, each hotel receives a "Merit % Score" to enable comparison of hotels with similar star ratings. Hotels that are deemed to stand out may also receive a "Red Star" "AA Inspectors' Choice" award. A similar award for guest accommodation is the "Gold Star" for properties deemed to stand out.

=== Campsites and caravan parks ===
The AA award a "Star rating" to campsites and caravan parks on a five-point scale. A percentage score is also awarded to enable comparison of parks with the same rating.

=== Restaurants ===
AA inspectors award AA rosettes on a one to five system. About one in ten restaurants have been awarded one or more rosettes. As of 2024, around 1,500 restaurants in the United Kingdom hold AA rosettes.

== See also ==
- Vehicle recovery
- Campaign for Safe Road Design
- Norfolk House, Basingstoke – former headquarters
- Widmerpool Hall – former home of AA patrol training school
