= List of magazines in the Netherlands =

The Dutch Association of Publishers categorizes the magazines in the Netherlands into four classes: (1) general-interest magazines, (2) opinion magazines, (3) TV and radio guides, and (4) professional and scientific magazines. The listing here is topical, without making a value judgment if, for example, a music magazine is professional or not.

== Car and motorcycle ==
- Auto Review
- Autovisie
- Autoweek (since 1958)
- Carros
- Formule1.nl
- De Kampeerauto
- Mercedes magazine
- Moto 73
- Motor
- Porsche Scene Live
- Promotor
- Top Gear (Dutch version)
- Truckstar

== Career ==
- Intermediair (?–2012; now webzine)

== Children and young adults ==
- Betsalel (1928-1935), defunct Dutch Jewish youth magazine
- Donald Duck (since 1952)
- Eppo (1975–1999; since 2009)
- Mad (1965–1995; 2011–2012)
- Tina (since 1967)

== Families ==
- AllesVoor
- ANBO Magazine
- Kampioen (since 1885), distributed to members of the Royal Dutch Touring Club
- Navenant
- Party
- Plus
- Privé (since 1977), gossip weekly
- Story (since 1974), gossip weekly
- Terdege
- Weekend (since 1975), gossip weekly
- Zin

== Film ==
- Filmkrant (since 1981)
- Skoop (1963–1993)
- Skrien (1968–2009; 2010–2011)

== Food ==
- Allerhande (since 1954), free magazine of Albert Heijn
- Boodschappen, monthly
- Chateau (1993–1996)
- Delicious
- Elle Eten (since 1998)
- Foodies
- Jamie Magazine
- Koken & Genieten
- La Cucina Italiana
- Menu Magazine (1992–1996)
- Tip Culinair (1992–2004)

== Inflight ==
- Holland Herald

== Literature ==
- Boekzaal der Geleerde Wereld (1715–1811)
- Hollands Maandblad (weekly Hollands Weekblad, 1959–1963; monthly since 1963)
- Maatstaf (1953–1999)
- De Nieuwe Gids
- ZozoLala (1982–2011), comics magazine

== Men ==
- Fantastic Man
- Nieuwe Revu (since 1968)
- Panorama (since 1913)
- Playboy (Dutch version since 1983)

== Music ==
- Akkoord Magazine (since 1993)
- Heaven Magazine
- Hitkrant (since 1977)
- Luister (since 1952)
- Mens en Melodie (1946–2012)
- Oor (since 1971)

== News and opinion ==
- Elsevier (since 1945), right-wing
- De Groene Amsterdammer (since 1877), left-wing
- HP/De Tijd (De Tijd daily newspaper 1845–1974, weekly opinion magazine 1974–1990; Haagse Post weekly 1914–1990; combined since 1990; monthly since 2012), right-wing
- Maarten! (since 2008)
- Nieuw Israëlietisch Weekblad (since 1865)
- Nieuwe Revu
- Opinio
- De Post van den Neder-Rhijn (1781–1787; De nieuwe post van den Neder-Rhijn 1795–1799)
- Vrij Nederland (since 1940), left-wing

== Quackery and New Age ==
- A. Vogel's Gezondheidsnieuws (1963–2004)
- Bres (1965–2006)
- Leef met Elixer (Leef 1979–1983, Elixer 1980–1983, combined 1983-1984)
- Onkruid (since 1978)

== Science and technology ==
- Chip (Dutch edition)
- Computer easy
- Computer Idee
- Computer!Totaal (since 1992)
- C'T Magazine v. Computertech
- Hoog Spel (1990-2000)
- iCreate
- Kijk (since 1968)
- PC Magazine (had a Dutch printed version, years unknown)
- Personal Computer Magazine (since 1983)
- Power Unlimited (since 1993)
- Quest (since 2004)

== Sports ==
- 1900, bimonthly (since 2012)
- Ajax Magazine (1986–2007; continued online as Ajax iMagazine since 2011)
- Ajax-nieuws (1917–1987)
- ELF Voetbal (since 1982), soccer monthly
- Voetbal International (since 1965), soccer weekly
- Voetbal Magazine (since 1986), soccer monthly
- De Waterkampioen (since 1927), sailing and other surface water sports

== Women ==
- Avenue (1965–1995; 2001)
- Beatrijs (1939–1967), a Catholic woman's weekly
- Beau Monde, Dutch glamour magazine
- Cosmopolitan, Dutch version of an American magazine
- Elle, Dutch version of a French magazine
- Esta (2004–2013)
- Grazia, Dutch version of an Italian magazine
- Jan
- Knipmode (Madeleine since ?, Knip since 1969, Knipmode since 199?)
- Libelle (since 1934)
- Margriet (since 1938)
- Moeder (1934–1974), Catholic women's magazine
- Opzij (since 1972)
- Privé
- Viva (since 1972)
- Vriendin (since 1997)
- Vrouw

== Public broadcaster magazines ==
- Televizier (since 1967)
- VPRO Gids (since 1974)
- VARA Gids (since 1928)
- TROSKompas (1964-2014)
- miKRO Gids (since 1988)
- Veronica Magazine (since 1974)
- NCRV Gids (since 19??)
- VPRO Achterwerk (1976-2016)
- TV Magazine (1988-2008)
- AVROBode (197?-2014)
- MijnKRO (since 2015)
- MijnNCRV (since 2015)
- EO Visie (since 1976)

== See also ==
- Books in the Netherlands
