= Ajax Life =

- Type: Bi-weekly newspaper
- Format: Broadsheet
- Owner(s): Supportersvereniging Ajax
- Publisher: Z-Press Sport & Media
- Editor-in-chief: Erol Erdogan
- Editor: Mike Van Damme
- Founded: 1989
- Language: Dutch
- Headquarters: Arenaboulevard 83-95, Amsterdam, Netherlands
- Circulation: 130,000
- Website: www.ajaxlife.nl

Ajax Life (Dutch pronunciation: [ˈaːjɑks ˈlɑif]) is the largest Dutch fanzine/newspaper, with a bi-weekly circulation of approximately 94,000. Ajax Life is based in Amsterdam. Erol Erdogan is the editor-in-chief of the paper.

Ajax Life is owned by the Supportersvereniging Ajax (SVA).

== History ==
Founded in 1989 as gloss-covered 200-page bi-monthly Magazine, the publication was later changed to a bi-weekly newspaper, with occasional special edition magazines as well. Under SVA chairman Jan van Vugt, the bi monthly magazine was converted into a bi-weekly newspaper in the year 2000. Having been in circulation for over two decades, it is one of the longest running fanzine/supporters publication in the Netherlands with the furthest reach, with 130,000 subscribers in 2023.

== See also ==
- 1900 magazine
- Ajax Magazine
- Ajax-nieuws
- Supportersvereniging Ajax
