= Gregorius Nekschot =

Dutch cartoonist

Gregorius Nekschot is the pseudonym of a controversial Dutch cartoonist, notable for his disagreement and mockery of political ideas regarding Dutch multicultural society, and the behaviour of people with rigid religious or ideological views. His comics also frequently mention on Islam. Gregorius Nekschot publishes his cartoons primarily on his own website, but are also available in print from one publisher. On May 13, 2008, the cartoonist was arrested and taken into custody for interrogation. He was released after 30 hours, and it was expected that he would be prosecuted for discriminatory speech, for insulting certain groups in society on the basis of their race or beliefs and possibly also for the crime of inciting hatred. His arrest has caused much debate in the press and parliament in what has been coined The Affair by Trouw newspaper on May 24, 2008. Charges against him were eventually dropped in September 2010. In December 2011, he announced he would no longer publish cartoons.

== Pseudonym ==
In an interview the cartoonist has given an explanation for his sombre name. With "Gregorius" he refers to Pope Gregory IX, who instituted the Papal Inquisition, and "Nekschot" means literally "shot in the neck," a method used, according to the cartoonist, by "fascists and communists to get rid of their opponents."

== Freedom of speech ==
=== Theo van Gogh ===
Gregorius Nekschot was an associate of filmmaker Theo van Gogh who was murdered in 2004 by a young, homegrown, Muslim fundamentalist by the name of Mohammed Bouyeri. Van Gogh supported Nekschot by including his cartoons on his website De Gezonde Roker (The Healthy Smoker). Both Van Gogh and Gregorius Nekschot criticized Islam's perceived unwillingness to adopt the Dutch value of tolerance. Nekschot's two comic books Misselijke grappen (Sick jokes) are published by Uitgeverij Xtra in Amsterdam. The same company publishes Theo van Gogh's Allah weet het beter (Allah knows best).

=== Blasphemy ===
Following the murder of Theo van Gogh, a debate arose in the Netherlands about the limits of freedom of speech. This debate arose again when Danish cartoon affair and the making of the controversial film Fitna in 2008 by Dutch MP Geert Wilders of the Party for Freedom (PVV). Justice minister Ernst Hirsch Ballin of the Christian Democratic Appeal (CDA) party wished to revitalize a law on blasphemy and expand it with protecting non-religious philosophies of life. Since writer Gerard Reve was acquitted in 1966 for writing about intercourse with God as a donkey, the government had no longer prosecuted blasphemy. Minister Ballin met with opposition in parliament however, wished to completely abolish laws on blasphemy.

=== Lèse majesté ===
Another law which might affect cartoons by Gregorius Nekschot is that of 'Lèse Majesté.' The cartoonist has indeed drawn the majesty of Queen Beatrix in compromising positions. The last time that such an offense, in an artistic expression, was prosecuted, was in 1969, when the majesty of Queen Juliana was insulted by cartoonist Willem Holtrop, who presented her as a red-light district prostitute, and was fined 200 guilders. However, the cartoons for which Nekschot was investigated did not include those of the queen in sexually explicit positions with the prime minister.

=== Discrimination ===
Never have artists been prosecuted for discriminatory speech. Discriminatory speech was first brought within the penal code in the years preceding World War II. The present wording of the code follows a 1966 treaty to banish all forms of racial discrimination. In 1996 however, a Christian MP, and a few years later, a Muslim imam were prosecuted for derogatory comments about homosexuals. Both were acquitted, the judge giving priority to their freedom of religion.

In a weekend special of Trouw newspaper on May 24, 2008, about the Nekschot 'affair' author Nahed Selim of Allah houdt niet van vrouwen (Allah doesn't like women, 2007) argues that discrimination laws have turned out to be discriminatory themselves, allowing only religious people to speak freely. She cites a case of a mosque in Amsterdam selling ancient books with paragraphs about homosexuals and of an imam in The Hague giving instructions for light corporal punishment of women, both of which were not prosecuted. She observes this to be a reversal of the intention of freedom of religion: to protect people from discrimination, not to provide a safe haven for it. Selim concludes that equality before the law in a rechtsstaat then demands abolishing the laws on discriminatory speech.

== Criticism ==
Nekschot has met with strong resistance from elements in society he seeks to criticize. His early work appeared in the satirical Amsterdam student magazine Propria Cures. The mainstream newspapers were unwilling to publish his cartoons on a regular basis, with the exception of weekly magazine HP/De Tijd. Nekschot says he has been threatened by fundamentalist Muslims and Dutch anarchists. Dutch Jews, perceiving parallels with cartoons in Nazi publication Der Stürmer, and a member of parliament for the CDA party emailed him with strong objections to his cartoons. After his release Nekschot said he had never before received objections from authorities. Only a local initiative against discrimination of Muslims, supported by a city district of Amsterdam, once summoned him to remove cartoons from his website. However, he deliberately seeks to criticize Islam because of the 'apartheid' it advocates between men and women, Muslims and non-Muslims and because he considers circumcision of children a crime. The cartoonist was nominated for a Clickies, a Dutch web-comic award in 2005. A review of his Misselijke grappen in de Volkskrant newspaper of March 31, 2006 considered his (quoting the artist himself) 'needlessly offensive' work was not mirrored by any form of idealism. The reviewer did not discuss who is to judge the need or cause to offend. Having no such judge, may in itself be an ideal. When asked where he himself believed freedom of speech should stop, Nekschot replied that a cartoon should never call for violence.

== Arrest ==
On May 13, 2008, Gregorius Nekschot was arrested at his home in Amsterdam. The cartoonist was taken into custody for interrogation, but released after 30 hours. According to the press release by the prosecutor's office, the arrest was made in the presence of a judge, a public prosecutor, two assistants to the prosecutor and six civilian clothed police officers. According to the same release, the home of the cartoonist was traced by establishing who paid the monthly fees for the website and a search of the premises was necessary to confirm the identity of the cartoonist. After his release, Nekschot arrived at the editorial board of HP/De Tijd magazine with a new mobile phone, his previous one apparently confiscated by the police. In an interview with newspaper de Volkskrant, he commented that it was the first time in 800 years of satire history in the Netherlands that an artist was put in jail. Expanding on his arrest Nekschot said that police took much material like DVDs from his home. They also confiscated sketchbooks with never published drafts for his cartoons. He suspects that they were hoping to find material which would tie him to right-wing extremist views. Nekschot says that he remained silent during interrogation, but nerves and laughter once broke his silence when police were reading him in official jargon a description of one of his cartoons. 'It felt like being in a Monty Python'. Justice minister Hirsch Ballin informed Parliament on May 20, 2008, that the purpose of the police visit was the search itself and that it was only a coïncidence that the cartoonist had been present and was arrested. He also added that two uniformed police officers had stood guard in front of Nekschot's house.

== Allegations ==
Gregorius Nekschot's arrest was preceded by several reports to the police of discrimination, the first of which was made in April 2005. Many said the reports were made at the initiative of a controversial Dutch convert to Islam, but no source was given. The office of the public prosecutor alleged that after reviewing dozens of cartoons by Gregorius Nekschot, it considered that eight cartoons, by attributing negative qualities to certain groups of people, are insulting and constituted the crime of discrimination according to article 137c and possibly also the crime of inciting hate according to article 137d of the Dutch Penal Code.

== Anonymity ==
In several reports the cartoonist's fear of losing his anonymity and becoming a target of physical attack have been mentioned. The editors of HP/De Tijd have reported that the cartoonist experienced that one police officer made fun of him losing his anonymity because of his arrest.

== Prosecution ==
The public prosecutor in the case has been named as Paul Velleman. In an article in de Volkskrant Henny Sackers, from the law school of Radboud University in Nijmegen, is quoted to suggest that the prosecutor may use Nekschot as a case-study to explore the limits of the laws on free speech. In parliament, the evening before, the justice minister Hirsch Ballin had denied a similar suggestion by MP De Wit for the SP. Hirsch Ballin specified his own involvement with the arrest of Nekschot as follows. The prosecutor's office had been intensely and meticulously busy with the cartoons and had been in contact with the minister on several occasions. The prosecutor himself had done a very careful assessment, in which the LECD was of the utmost importance, but had by himself concluded for which cartoons he was going to prosecute. In December 2006 the prosecutor had informed the minister about his intention to press charges against Gregorius Nekschot. In this communication the prosecutor specified which cartoons he deemed liable to prosecution and which cartoons not. There followed, said the minister, more conversations, deliberations and further particulars. In the meantime an 'interdepartmental study group cartoon problems' (interdepartementale studiegroep cartoonproblematiek) had been established to anticipate situations as in Denmark. Never had the minister given the prosecutor an order to stop or continue prosecution. He had only reviewed the consistency of the prosecution: for which cartoons to prosecute and for which ones not. There followed, once more, deliberations. Those contacts were continued, also within the study group. All this time the identity of Gregorius Nekschot was not investigated. Until the beginning of 2008 it was thought he was in fact two people.

All charges against Nekschot in the case were eventually dropped in September 2010. The only caveat is that he is still not allowed to show the cartoons on his own website any more due to Dutch penal code's article 137c, which forbids incitement to hatred. The images can still be reprinted when it is for journalistic reasons.

== MDI (Racism Monitoring Centre) ==
Marco Hughes, former activist director of MDI (Meldpunt Discriminatie op Internet), a centre that monitors racism on the internet, has also fallen victim to Gregorius Nekschot, when his organization incarnated as a rat copulating with would-be Dutch fundamentalist terrorists (Hofstadgroep) in one of Nekschots cartoons in Misselijke grappen 1(pag 138). In a Turkish journal Hughes complained in 2006 that Dutch authorities turned a blind eye to racist internet sites, naming both an apparently no longer existing site [on which visitors called] for setting fire to mosques and a site in support of Ayaan Hirsi Ali publishing online shirts poking fun at the prophet. Hughs said Dutch authorities failed to take action about Muslim complaints. In a news release on their website MDI said it would take a special interest in monitoring developments in the case. A surge of 80 reports about cartoons and text on the website of the cartoonist at the beginning of 2005 was passed on by them to the public prosecutor. It was denied that they had filed a complaint in the name of Dutch convert Van de Ven, as was reported by others. The timing of the surge of complaints follows shortly the murder of Theo van Gogh in November 2004, perhaps providing a foundation for suggestions by Opheffer and Sylvain Ephimenco in Trouw (see press reactions) that prosecution of Van Gogh smells of a posthumous reckoning with the murdered filmmaker.

MDI is founder of international internet hate crime fighter INACH. INACH believes the Netherlands, 'once a liberal democracy where the rights of all were protected', should balance the fight against terrorism by enforcing and expanding anti-discrimination laws. INACH says that some members of parliament have the wrong priorities if they are worried more by infringement of free speech than protecting its citizens against a cartoonist 'who hates blacks and Muslims.' Niels van Tameren, the present day director of MDI would like the judge to decide whether this is a case of 'free speech or racism'.

== Discriminatory cartoons ==
The office of the public prosecutor has seen to the removal of the eight allegedly discriminatory cartoons from the internet. It has not informed the public which cartoons it considered discriminatory and why. This lack of information has led to speculation in all media as to which cartoons were the 'forbidden' ones. There was no clear understanding among the public or press what constituted a crime in a cartoon. The prosecutor had also not specified which groups were discriminated against by Gregorius Nekschot. A large body of the cartoonist's work deals with Muslims. For example: one cartoon deals with an incident in which an imam refused to shake hands with a female minister and implies that the same hands do not object to receiving social security hand-outs from the government. The HP/De Tijd (May 23, 2008) Nekschot fires back issue became available in the shops on May 21 and included all eight cartoons, putting an end to speculation on which cartoons the justice officials deemed illegal.

== Press reactions ==
=== Newspapers initial reactions ===
After his arrest, many mainstream media supported Gregorius Nekschot by publishing his cartoons, as for example on the front page of Amsterdams Het Parool newspaper. All mainstream newspapers raised questions about at least the way the prosecutor handled the arrest and expressed doubts about the prosecutor's chances of winning a conviction. Only the small, but influential with the government's Christian parties, Trouw newspaper has been somewhat supportive of the prosecution itself, stating in its chief editorial that only a judge can decide whether the cartoons constitute a crime. In an editorial, the newspaper most closely associated with the government PvdA party, de Volkskrant, immediately condemned the decision to police satire or other 'cultural candy'. Many cartoonists of newspapers made drawings in support of Gregorius Nekschot. The nation's largest newspaper De Telegraaf on its front page on May 22, 2008, focused its readers attention on a colourful painting of two rather abstract female nudes by artist Ellen Vroegh that the municipality of Huizen removed from public space at city hall at the request of a Muslim gentlemen. A sideshow. Other sideshows turned up bearing witness to tension within the social-democratic PvdA party which accommodates both traditional socialists and immigrants. In de Volkskrant (May 22, 2008) two University Law School professors advised the justice minister not to interfere with the case to conserve the prosecutors neutrality. MP Fred Teeven for the VVD, a former prosecutor, however denied the prosecutor's neutrality and declared it a political case. Paul de Beer, a labor relations professor at the University of Amsterdam, in the same de Volkskrant shared his concern that the freedom of the press was not in safe hands with the governments Christian CDA party. He cited several other muzzlings of the press, most importantly the prime-ministers continued legal action against weekly Opinio, which had published a fictional speech by the prime-minister challenging his official position on Islam.

=== Weekly magazines ===
Syp Wynia in Elsevier magazine argued that events pointed to a sudden and conspicuous change of policy within the prosecutor's office, and by its highest authority: the justice minister. Also he expressed surprise that cartoons insulting Christians did not receive police attention. Vrij Nederland May 24, 2008 issue in a short article Lange tenen (Long toes) attempted to downplay the media hype. Denying exaggerated talk on internet of a clash of civilizations and wanting to be evenhanded, the editors reminded readers of recent arrests of protestors against Wilders and concluded that the government is nervous about all trespassing. Crying Bwehhh! Scandalous the Opheffer column in De Groene Amsterdammer, was pissed off by the intellectual crowd that distanced itself first from the rudeness of the cartoons, before criticizing the arrest. Opheffer said the cartoons were excellent and a great comfort to him after Van Gogh's murder.

=== Newspapers continued ===
Cartoonist Ruben L. Oppenheimer in NRC Handelsblad (May 24–25, 2008, pg 14) presented a fictional, signed and stamped, document of the Kingdom of the Netherlands, headed (in translation): PLEDGE OF LOYALTY, SUPREME NATIONAL AUTHORITY FOR WISDOM OF THE PRESS AND HUMOUR EXPERIENCE, SUB-DEPARTMENT CARTOON ARTS. One of the stamps was from the 'Interdepartementale Werkgroep Cartoonproblematiek' or the 'Interdepartemental Studygroup Cartoonproblems' the existence of which and its discussion of the Nekschot cartoons was revealed in parliament by the minister of justice. On the same page, in a satirical column the paper's editor Marc Chavannes pretended to have received a document from the governments legal counsel, addressed to the PM, advising him to declare a state of limited emergency in order to win his lawsuit against Opinio magazine, which had published a secret speech under his name to his political advisors (obviously a pastiche), admitting that not extremist Islam was the problem, but Islam itself.

Another and important contribution was made by Frenchman Sylvain Ephimenco, a regular columnist in Trouw, in the weekend special De Affaire (May 24, 2008), believing that the intimidating action against Gregorius Nekschot bears an uncomfortable resemblance to a posthumous reckoning with Theo van Gogh. Although he judged the cartoonist as merely provocative, he pointed to his obvious relationship in style and real life with the murdered filmmaker. While Europe celebrated its May 1968 heritage, he saw the Netherlands turning its head the other way. He documented the way in which Christian politicians within a few weeks after the murder of Van Gogh changed the issue from the filmmakers very real slit throat to the virtual wounds of the religious soul. He agreed that there should be a limit to free speech, but only when it incites hate or violence. He refrained from a personal opinion whether such was the case with Gregorius Nekschot, but said he had been informed by (unnamed) specialists that this was not the case. The Nekschot-affair thus became 'a serious incident, without precedent' in modern times, associating the Netherlands with regimes for which works of art are threatening.

Following the weekend Trouw on Monday May 26, 2008 offered a third of a page to Thomas Mertens, a professor at both the Nijmegen and Leiden universities in 'theory and philosophy of the law' and 'human rights and obligations.' Mertens, reacting to both the Nekschot and Jonas Staal affairs, shared with his readers his surprise at so many defending some absolute right to speak freely. He said this belief in 'free speech' was legally undefendable and in this case very likely abused to serve a wish to discredit a certain minority in society. Defending justice minister Hirsch Ballin he said the government was held to protect 'the good standing and rights' of this minority.

NRC Handelsblad the same day, in a twist, had one of its illustrators comment in words instead of pictures, actually writing that life for Dutch cartoonists was made too easy in a world with absolute freedom of speech. Also he believed they used too many words in their cartoons and should concentrate on the drawing, being less explicit. Cyprian Koscielniak, a Pole by birth, drew on his fifteen years of experience as an illustrator in a country with a communist regime. Naturally, he said, he was not in favor of censorship.

de Volkskrant on May 28, 2008, informed us that the liberal VVD party would be turning its parliament offices into an art gallery for 'freethinkers'. Gregorius Nekschot had agreed to an exhibition.

=== Weekly magazines (2) ===
In Out of range, a supposedly new series about censorship, Rudi Kagie reveals a name that may be the real identity of Gregorius Nekschot. He considers the dilemma that this name had asked him not even to quote him as 'not being Gregorius Nekschot'. But Kagie points out his own freedom of speech to share with us the name, which is not repeated here. (Vrij Nederland, May 31, 2008). Becoming rich in Dubai is the cover story of HP/De Tijd of May 30, 2008 in which two articles deal with the arrested critic of Muslims trying their luck in the Netherlands. One is an interview with Esther Gasseling of Nekschots publisher Xtra telling us which bookshops are, and which are not selling his books.

The other is an interview with influential philosopher Paul Cliteur. He thinks the cartoons ask legitimate questions. He objects to the 'blaming ourselves' habit of the Dutch, even quoting the queen's Christmas message after the Van Gogh murder in which she said on equal terms that 'extremism in both word and deed' was dividing the country. As long as people didn't call for violence you should allow them their speech. He agreed however with interviewer Boudewijn Geels that one could expect politicians to be a little more careful. Geert Wilders, he believed, was learning. The real problem was that the MP could not live without security measures.

== Political reactions ==
Immediately after the arrest, justice minister Ernst Hirsch Ballin, a Christian-Democrat, was criticized by a large part of parliament for the arrest. He also found opposition from within his own Christian community. In an emergency debate in parliament on May 20, 2008, Hirsch Ballin expressed his support for the prosecutor but criticized the lengthy detention of the cartoonist. A majority within parliament, including the parties supporting the government, considered the manner in which the arrest was made 'disproportionate'. The minister denied accusations made by members of the opposition that the arrest was politically motivated. The decision to prosecute was made by the prosecutor and not as the result of government policy, said the minister. The minister confirmed, however, that he had been in contact with the office of the prosecutor at whose initiative the investigation was started.

On May 21, 2008, the popular and largest Dutch newspaper De Telegraaf headed an article about parliament's condemnation of the arrest with a quote of a right wing member of parliament comparing it to practices in former East-Germany. De Volkskrant, the same morning, mentioned near disbelief within the left wing GroenLinks party that the prosecutor's office had needed three years to establish the identity of Nekschot. MP De Wit from the socialist SP party suggested that the justice minister was seeking retribution for parliament's recent opposition to new legislation on profanity. De minister denied any relation.

== Attacks on authorities ==
In cartoons and satire that was published on his website one month before his arrest Gregorius Nekschot directed his creativity at the justice minister, the prime minister and the government chief terrorism official. Writing with another pseudonym, as Dolf Histler, he accused the justice minister of not being able to achieve much in the field of crime fighting and the cabinet of Christians and social democrats of prime minister Balkenende of religious mania. In a cartoon a naked prime minister is being depicted as 'in touch' with the darker side of public opinion through his 'mighty organ', being the government chief terrorism official as a tapeworm awaiting orders. In another cartoon, once more the prime minister is drawn as praying five times a week in front of a circumcised penis or lingam while wearing a fake beard and a djellaba.

== Cartoons described ==
The following cartoon was immediately after the arrest published in newspapers as being part of the eight that the prosecutor considered to be a crime:

- Now too a monument for the slavery of the white Dutch taxpayer, shows a chained white man, on a pedestal titled Kingdom of the Netherlands, carrying a very large black baby on his back. The cartoon appears to react to a debate about the meaning of a slavery monument for the descendants of slaves from Surinam and the Dutch Antilles. Another interpretation is that the cartoon joins a recent debate in Parliament about the financial burden of the Dutch Caribbean islands.

On May 21, 2008, the morning paper de Volkskrant confirmed the previous cartoon as being one of the eight cartoons liable to prosecution, and added two cartoons to the list on the authority of Nekschot himself:

- Ali sits comfortably on his pouffe. An elderly gentleman wearing a tie and fez informs us that nowhere in the Koran it reads that one is supposed to give something in return for thirty years of disability benefits, child support and housing subsidies. Nekschot later commented that his intention had been to show that religion stands in the way of complete participation of immigrants in society.
- Left wing Dutch unrelentingly optimistic, depicts a black youth wearing a baseball cap the wrong way round pointing two guns at the head of an elderly Dutch anarchist demanding cash money. The Dutchman looks at us and informs us: 'its only the second generation'. The cartoon comments on a general belief among many citizens that problems will evaporate with the generations. However, there has been a motion in parliament for special treatment of young people arriving from the island of Curaçao, by sending them back to the island when they embark on a criminal career.

Some facts behind these ideas may be supported by government statistics that actually analyze much information for different groups in society. An issue in defending the cartoonist in an opinion in NRCHandelsblad (May 20, 2008) was that Nekschot was not judged to attribute purely fictional negative qualities to his antagonists and they did not represent the group but only certain types within that group.

Publication of all eight cartoons in HP/De Tijd magazine in their May 23, 2008 issue titled 'Nekschot fires back' added the missing five:

- Muslim Democratic Party presents logo. A Muslim presents not a T-shirt but a burqa with the letters MDP and the silhouette of a bearded person copulating with a goat. The insult that Muslims, many of whom arrived in the Netherlands from provincial areas, had sexual intercourse with animals was frequently used by Theo van Gogh as a provocative image. Nekschot's Misselijke Grappen includes a cartoon of the Christian prime minister having intercourse with a cow in some provincial area of The Netherlands.
- Ali el Wakkie performs Islamic charity. A bearded man in eskimo or perhaps father Christmas clothes is having intercourse with a polar bear and tells us it is his duty to help the bear with an obstipation problem.
- Mrs Ouroubourou, born Klapstra. An elderly and very much beaten-up woman, using a crutch, finds that the Dutch too should adjust and that receiving a few hits is educational. The woman who is apparently married to a Muslim refers to a view sometimes expressed, and published by Joris Luyendijk, that a good Muslim sometimes beats his wife.
- Why young Muslims identify with Palestinians. A young man with a baseball cap worn the wrong way round and with a Smiley on the front of his jacket explains with his hands in his pockets:'loitering..., no school..., no homework..., provoking police..., benefits...'
- The Christmas-Imam wishes you a blessed holiday and.... A bearded man with father Christmas clothes, without pants, finishes the sentence while having sexual intercourse with a goat: 'a happy 1426', a reference to the Islamic calendar.

Other cartoons stayed available on the cartoonists website and could thus be considered as not being part of the eight supposedly criminal ones. However, Nekschot reported that police had shown him older cartoons and that he felt they had acted for political reasons on a dossier they had prepared a while ago.
