= Netherlands Institute of International Relations Clingendael =

International relations school in Wassenaar, Netherlands

Coordinates: 52.1001°N 4.3304°E

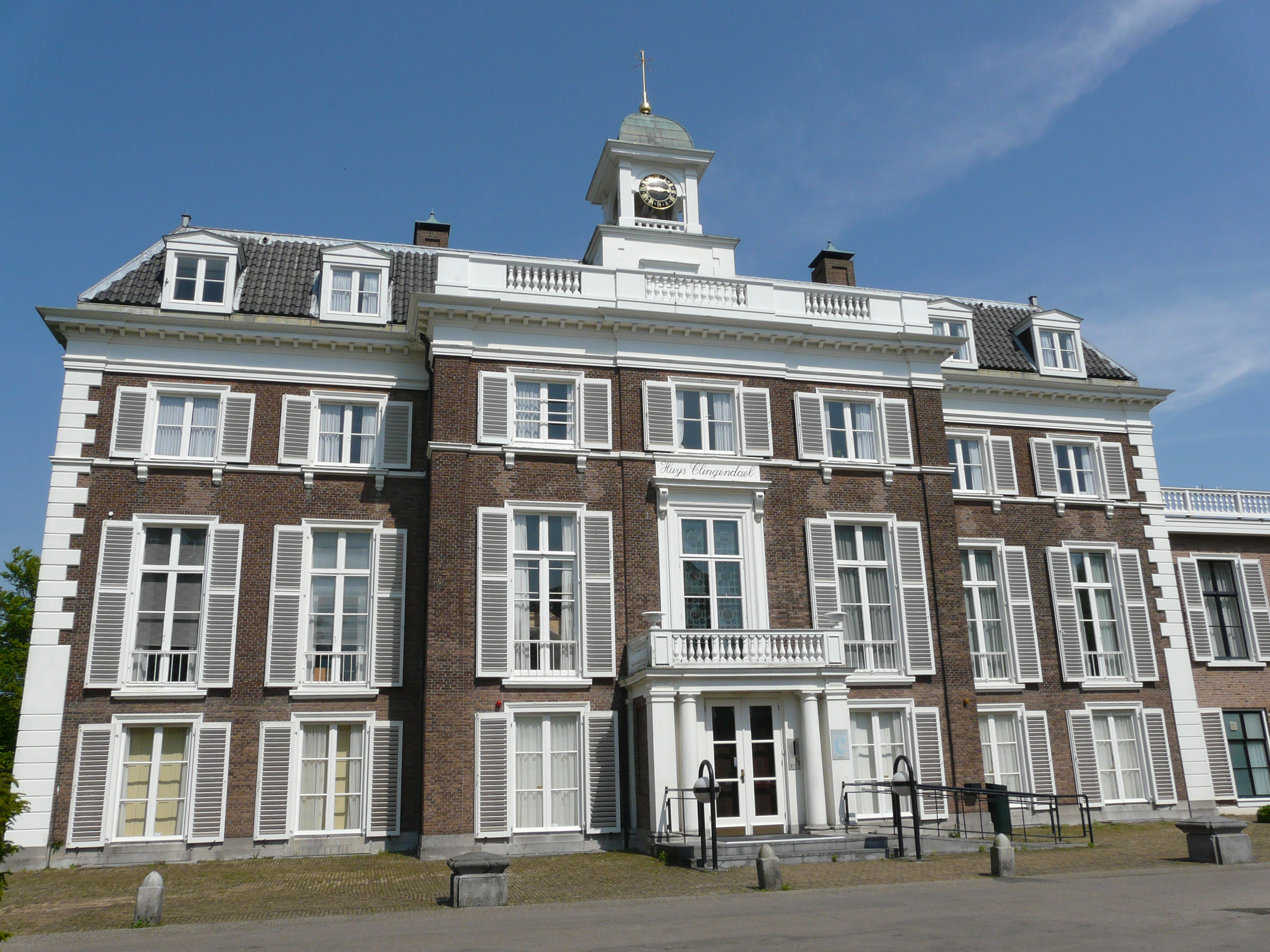
- Huys Clingendael in Wassenaar
- Abbreviation: Clingendael
- Formation: 1983
- Founded at: The Hague, Netherlands
- Type: Research institute, think tank
- Headquarters: Huys Clingendael, Wassenaar, Netherlands
- Affiliations: Hague Academic Coalition, ICCT, The Hague Institute, International Relations and Diplomacy at Leiden University
- Website: https://www.clingendael.org/

The Netherlands Institute of International Relations Clingendael (Dutch: Nederlands Instituut voor Internationale Betrekkingen Clingendael) or Clingendael Institute (Instituut Clingendael) is a Dutch think tank and academy on international relations. Based in Wassenaar on the municipal border with The Hague, the institute also publishes Clingendael Magazine 'Spectator', an online monthly on international politics. As of 2012, the institute is organised into two departments: Clingendael Research and Clingendael Academy.

Chairman of the Clingendael Institute is Paul van der Heijden. General Director is Bob Deen. Peter Haasbroek is Financial Director.

== History ==
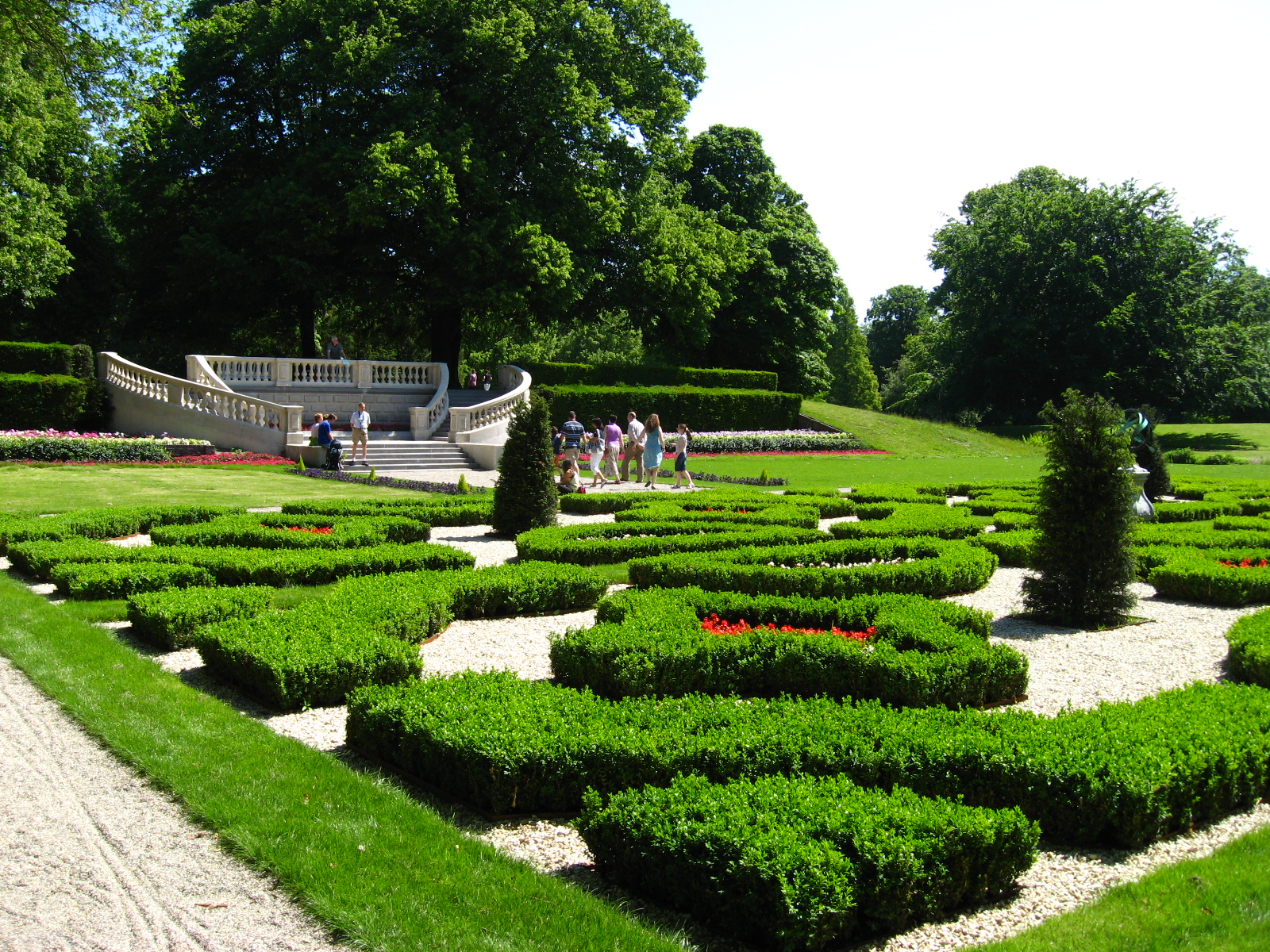
Clingendael estate

The Clingendael Institute was founded in 1983 as the merger of five smaller think tanks. The institute received funding and support from the Dutch Ministry of Defence.

== Programming ==
The research focus of the institute has changed throughout its history, responding to shifts within the discipline of international relations. Today, the organisation focuses much of its research and programming around the European Union and relations between member states, security issues around terrorism and the rule of law, sustainable development and diplomatic skills such as economic diplomacy, "conflict management, crisis control and negotiation techniques".

Both Clingendael and The Hague Institute for Strategic Studies (HCSS) are contracted by the Ministry of Defence to provide research and analysis of global trends and risks. Clingendael works closely with the Swedish Stockholm International Peace Research Institute and the American Armed Conflict Location and Event Data Project to complete these projects.

Clingendael's diplomatic academy has trained foreign service workers from both the Netherlands and outside countries, including Pakistan, Bangladesh and Kosovo. Since 2004, the institute has provided short-term training programmes for Indonesian diplomats. In the organisation's 2017 Annual Report, Clingendael noted that they trained 640 diplomats from over 150 countries, as well as civil servants from several other countries. Diplomats from Cyprus were trained on trade promotion and public diplomacy skills, diplomats from Bhutan were trained in negotiation techniques, as were the incoming non-permanent members of the United Nations Security Council. Specialists from the institute traveled to Bulgaria to assist civil servants in the country on how to work with the European Union in Brussels, while others traveled to Tbilisi to train cadets at the Georgian Defense Institution Building School in capacity building.

== Funding ==
Today, the institute receives about 75% of its funding from the Government of the Netherlands, primarily the Ministry of Foreign Affairs and Ministry of Defence.
