= Moeder =

Dutch women's magazine

Moeder (literally meaning "Mother") was a Dutch women's magazine, published from 1934 to 1974; from 1961 on the magazine was called De Prinses (literally "The Princess"). Edited by Jan Waterink, a preacher and professor and later rector at the VU University Amsterdam, it was a Christian weekly offering practical advice to housewives, combined with amusement and religious content. The magazine had a neo-Calvinist stance.

In the 1940s, the magazine had a readership of around 10,000; by 1961 when it changed its name to De Prinses, it had a circulation of 201,000, competitive with non-denominational magazines such as Libelle and Margriet. Unlike those two magazines, however, De Prinses did not manage to navigate the great changes in Dutch society of the late 1960s; secularization and depillarization greatly lessened the need for Protestant women's publications.
