= Royal Dutch Touring Club =

Motor club in the Netherlands

Royal Dutch Touring Club ANWB
- Native name: De Koninklijke Nederlandse Toeristenbond ANWB
- Formerly: Algemene Nederlandsche Wielrijders-Bond
- Type: Besloten vennootschap
- Industry: Mobility and insurance
- Founded: July 1, 1883; 143 years ago in Utrecht
- Founder: Edo Johannes Bergsma; Dirk ter Haar
- Headquarters: Wassenaarseweg 220, 2596 EC, The Hague, Netherlands
- Services: Roadside assistance, traffic safety, travel insurance, etc.
- Revenue: ▲€1.1 billion (2018)
- Operating income: ▲€40.7 million (2018)
- Members: 4,561,335 (2018)
- Number of employees: 3,718 (2018)
- Website: anwb.nl

The Royal Dutch Touring Club ANWB (Dutch: Koninklijke Nederlandse Toeristenbond ANWB), known simply as ANWB (pronounced [aːʔɛnʋeːˈbeː]), is a travelers' association in the Netherlands, supporting all modes of travel. It provides test reports, travel services and roadside assistance and is comparable to the German Allgemeiner Deutscher Automobil-Club (ADAC) and the British Automobile Association (AA).

ANWB has over five million members, and is the largest not-for-profit association in the Netherlands.

== History ==
The ANWB was founded on July 1, 1883 in Utrecht by members of the velocipede clubs in The Hague and Haarlem under the name Nederlandsche Vélocipèdisten-Bond. The club then had 200 members. Two years later the name was changed to Algemene Nederlandsche Wielrijders-Bond, where the abbreviation A.N.W.B. comes from. Since the association was formally called 'tourist association' (1905), the letters ANWB no longer have any meaning.

Since the end of the nineteenth century, the association has been concerned not only with cyclists, but also with motorists, hikers, horse riders, motorcyclists, water sports enthusiasts, winter sports enthusiasts and campers. The ANWB had 4.561.335 members in 2018, making it the largest association in the Netherlands.

In addition to selling insurance, travel and testing, there is also the Wegenwacht (founded in 1946), an emergency center and legal assistance activities of the ANWB. The ANWB publishes twelve magazines, including the association magazine, De Kampioen. In addition, the association is a publisher of travel guides. The ANWB also provides signage on local and provincial roads.

Since the end of the eighties, the ANWB has also provided traffic information for regional and national radio stations. In 1998 the ANWB entered into an agreement with the Dutch Public Broadcasting to provide traffic reports on all national public radio stations. In 2006, the traffic information department was downsized due to a reorganization.

The ANWB is important as a lobby organization for Dutch motorists, due to the association's influence on Dutch politics.

== Headquarters ==
The ANWB headquarters is located on the edge of the Clingendael estate, on the border of Wassenaar and The Hague. It comprises the elongated office building and the lower public center, the Rotonde. The headquarters has been on the National Monuments List since 2014.

== Wegenwacht ==
Following the example of the British Automobile Association, the ANWB wanted to start their own roadside assistance service (in the Netherlands more commonly known as a Wegenwacht) in 1939. However, the Second World War prevented the rapid realization of these plans. After the war the ANWB took over 25 Harley-Davidson Liberator motorcycles from the Canadian liberators. On April 15, 1946, the first seven road guards, or Wegenwachters were active. Roadside assistance was immediately popular, mainly because of the poor quality of the cars after the war. In the first year 10,000 cars were serviced (the Netherlands had 30,000 cars at the time). The number of roadside assistance motorcycles had already grown to 70 in 1948, and the 250,000th member was registered in 1951.

Currently, the ANWB Wegenwacht is the largest car breakdown service in the Netherlands. It is also the only breakdown service provider that is allowed to directly repair, or work on cars along the Dutch highways. Other service providers are only allowed to tow cars.

== Current activities of the ANWB ==
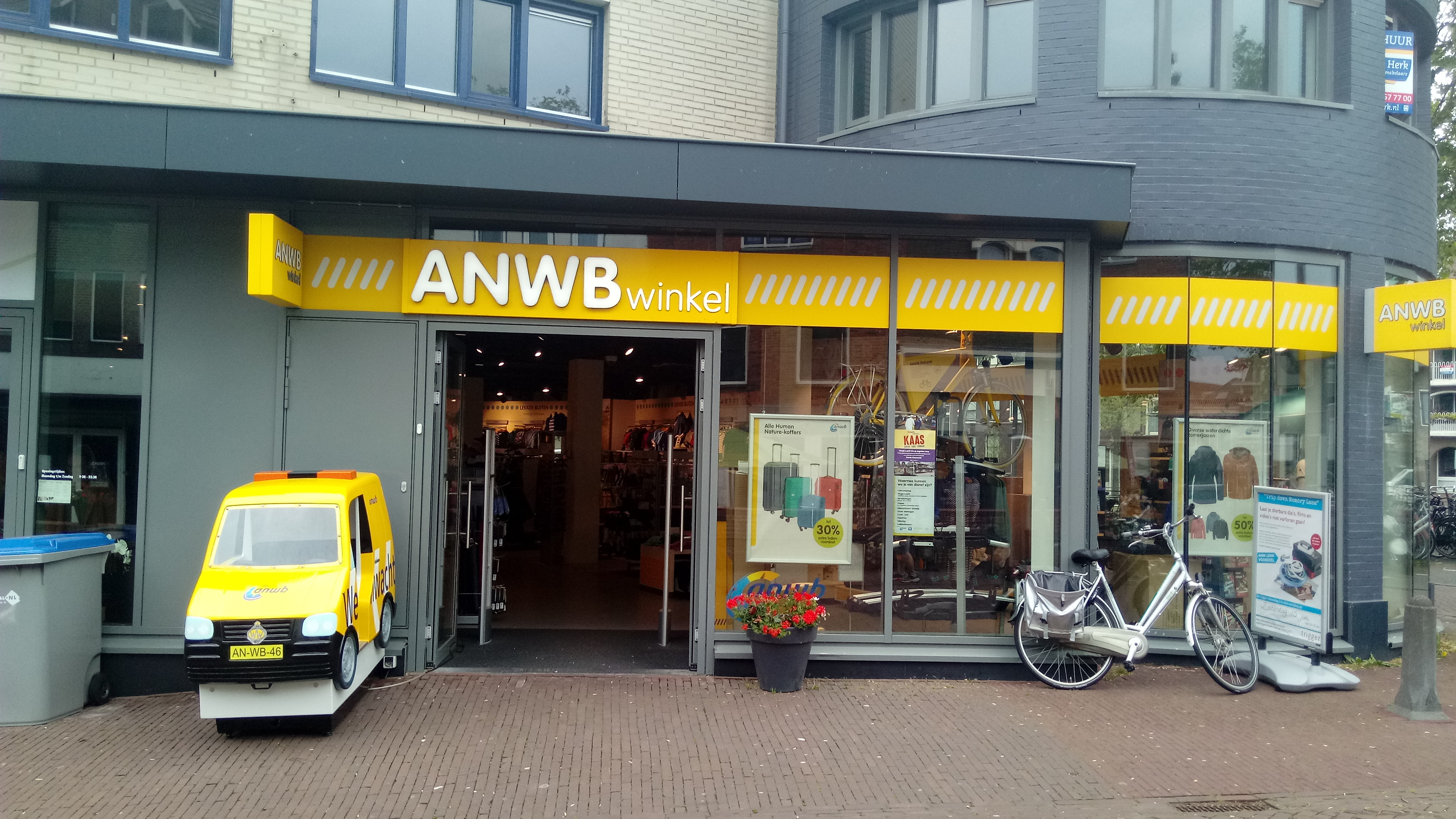
An ANWB shop in Gouda (2019)

The ANWB offers various services for both members and non-members.

- Roadside assistance, breakdown assistance;
- Emergency center, a control room for personal or vehicle assistance;
- Trauma helicopters, the subsidiary ANWB Medical Air Assistance (MAA) offers medical assistance by helicopter in the event of very serious accidents;
- Legal aid in the field of mobility, recreation and tourism;
- Advice and information in the field of cars, caravans, camping and water sports;
- Publisher of travel guides, books, maps and magazines;
- Car sales service;
- Traffic information for regional and national public radio stations;
- Operation of ANWB shops;
- Driver's education for professional drivers and private individuals at the Test and Training Center in Lelystad, and in schools;
- Vehicle insurance;
- Travel through various subsidiaries;
- Travel ticket sales;
- ANWB Parking, a provider of mobile parking;
- ANWB Charging Service: fast charging for electric cars along the highway and at ANWB locations;
- ANWB Golf, (digital) golf club.
