= Huys Clingendael =

Manor house and parkland in the Netherlands

Coordinates: 52.1001°N 4.3306°E

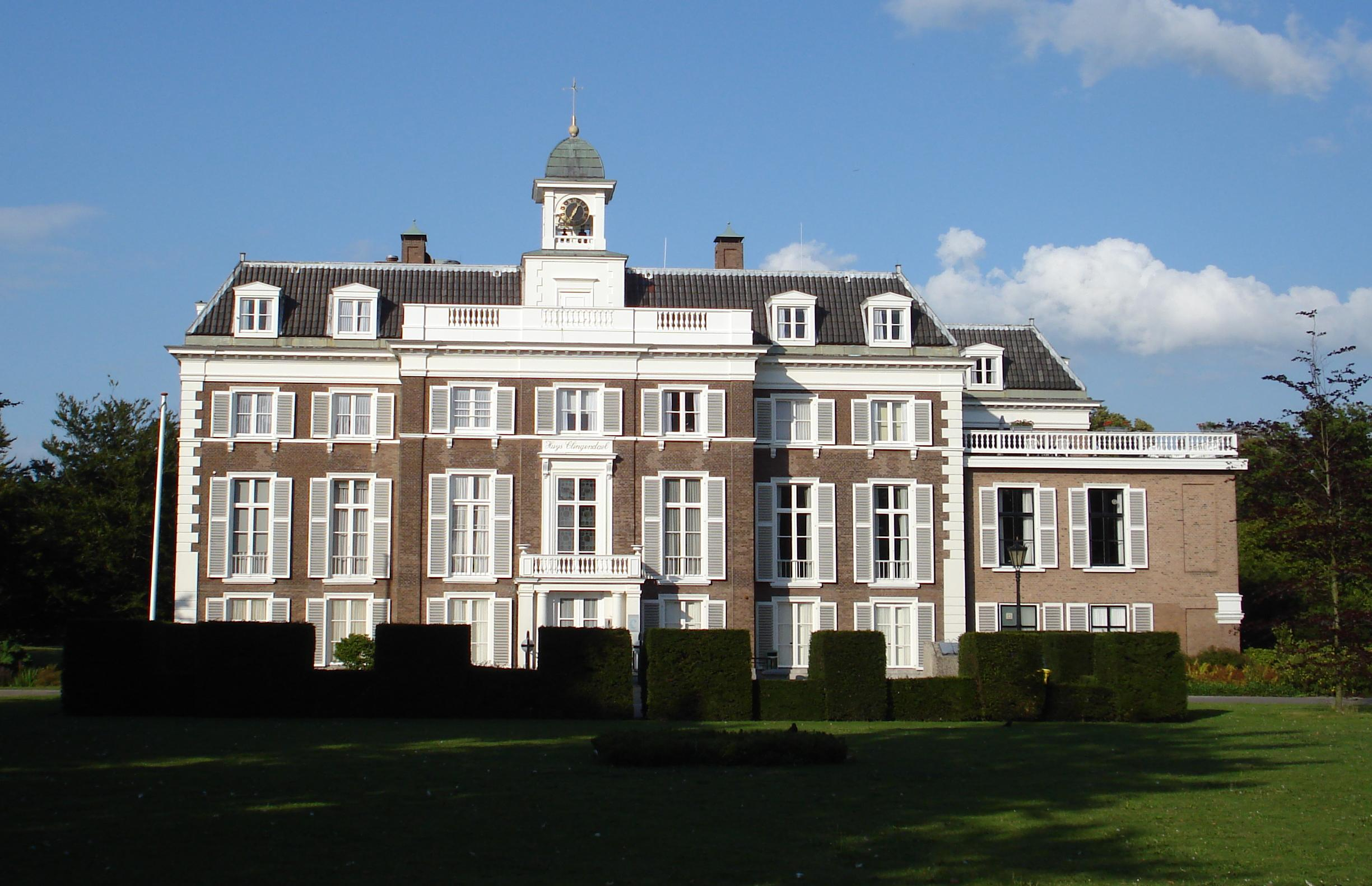
Huys Clingendael

Clingendael is the name of a 17th-century manor house and surrounding parkland just outside The Hague, Netherlands, in the municipality of Wassenaar. Since 1982, it houses the Netherlands Institute of International Relations Clingendael.

== History ==
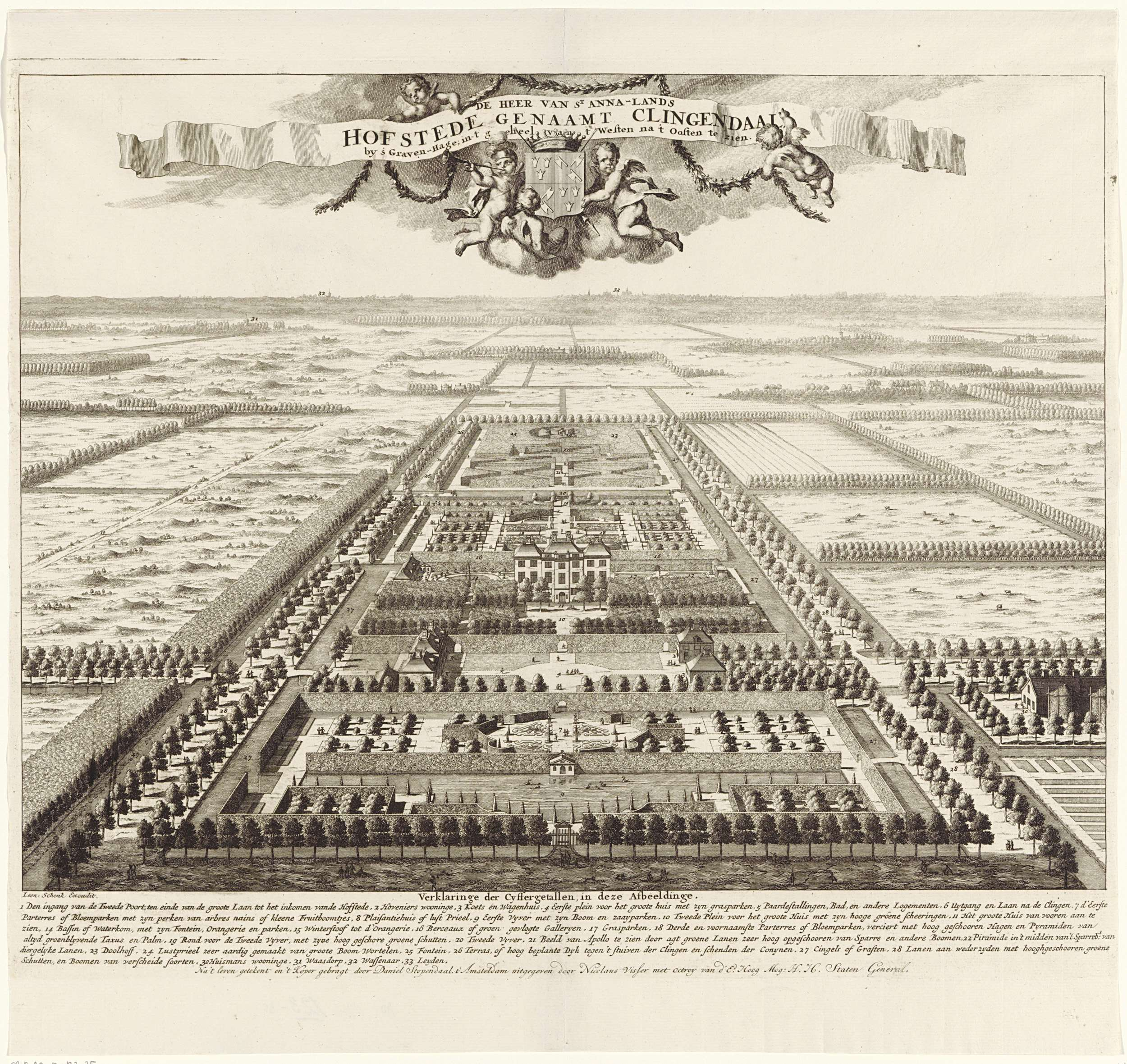
The estate as it was at the end of the 17th century

The name Clingendael means valley in the dunes. In 1591, Philips Doublet acquired the farm and surrounding land. The original part of the manor house was built between 1643 and 1660 for Philip Doublet III. Several of the Doublets held the office of Treasurer General in the Republic of the Seven United Provinces.

Philip's wife was the sister to the celebrated poet and statesman, Constantijn Huygens, and Philip’s son married one of Huygens’ daughters, Suzanna. The architecture of the original part of Clingendael shares some of the features of the Huygens’s country house in Voorburg, Hofwijck.

In 1804, the estate passed on to Baron Willem van Brienen. His son, Baron Arnoud van Brienen, merged Clingendael with the neighbouring estate of Oosterbeek. The two estates are separated by a meandering moat. He also built a racecourse for his guests at Clingendael; it has since been moved to nearby Duindigt. Arnout’s unmarried daughter Marguérite, known as Lady Daisy, laid out Clingendael’s fine Japanese garden.

In 1914, the manor house was renovated by the architect Johan Mutters, and was expanded in 1915 by Co Brandes and J.Th. Wouters.

During World War II, the estate was confiscated by the Nazis and occupied by Reichskommissar Arthur Seyss-Inquart. The many bunkers in the grounds of the estate date from this period.

After the war, Baron Edgar Michiels van Verduynen and his family, and Baron Johann Edzard von Ripperda and his family moved into the two estates. Both families had lost their respective, ancestral homes during the war.

In 1953, the gardens and parkland were sold to the state and, subsequently, opened up to the public. The families Michiels van Verduynen and Von Ripperda remained at the combined Clingendael-Oosterbeek estate.

Since 1982, following a thorough renovation, the manor is home the Clingendael Institute.

== Japanese Garden ==
The Japanese Garden was created in the beginning of the 20th century by Baroness Marguérite van Brienen (1871-1939), also called Lady Daisy. Lady Daisy sailed off a number of times by ship to Japan and brought back to the Netherlands a number of lanterns, a water cask, sculptures, the pavilion, the little bridges and several plants.

The original design with the serene pond, meandering brook and the winding pathways has remained intact all these years.

The Municipality of The Hague has always taken great care of the Japanese Garden because of its uniqueness and tremendous historical value. The garden was placed on the list of national historical monuments in 2001. Due to its fragility, the garden can be visited only during a short period of the year.

== Gallery ==
The grounds

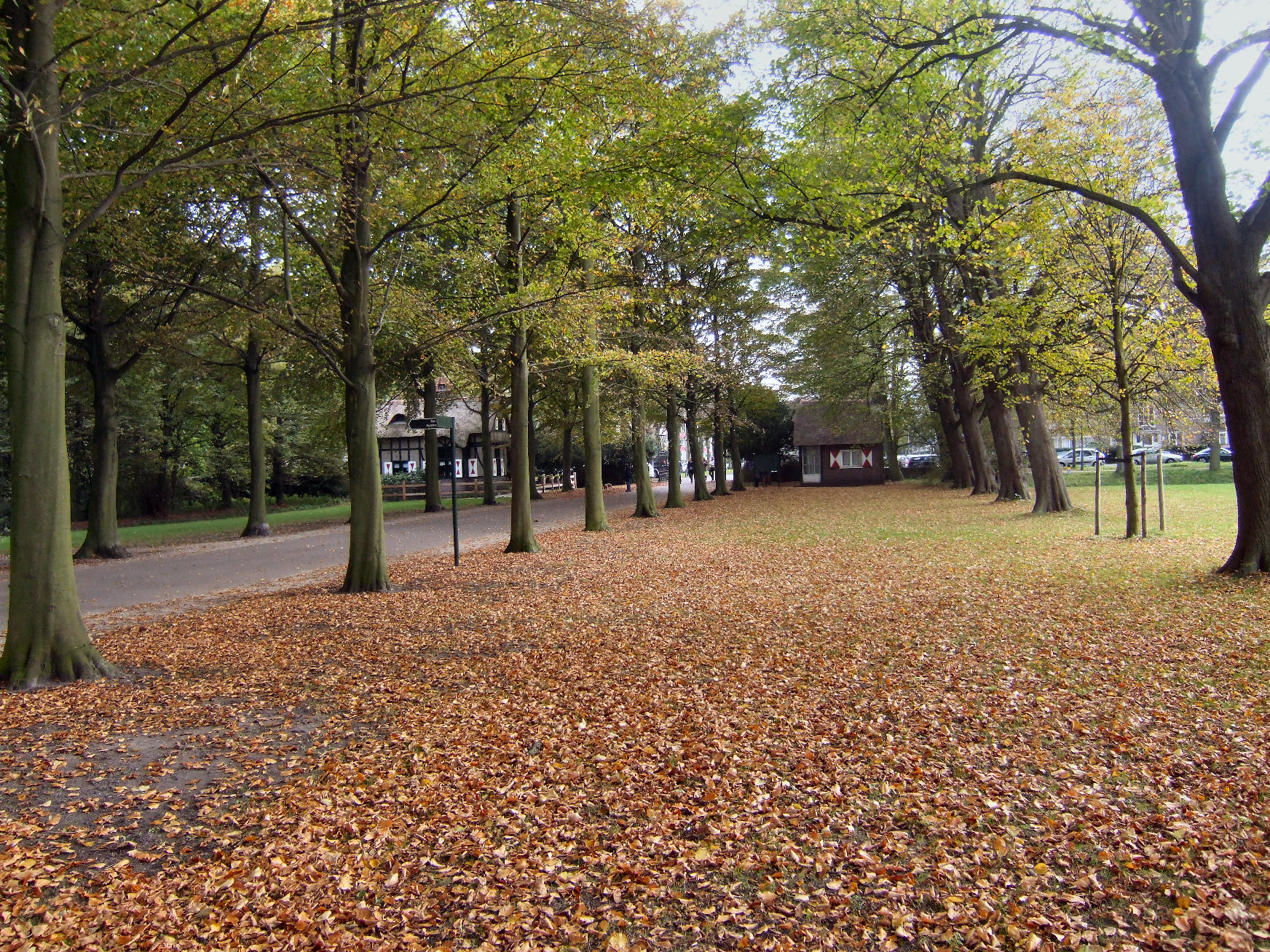
Clingendael drive

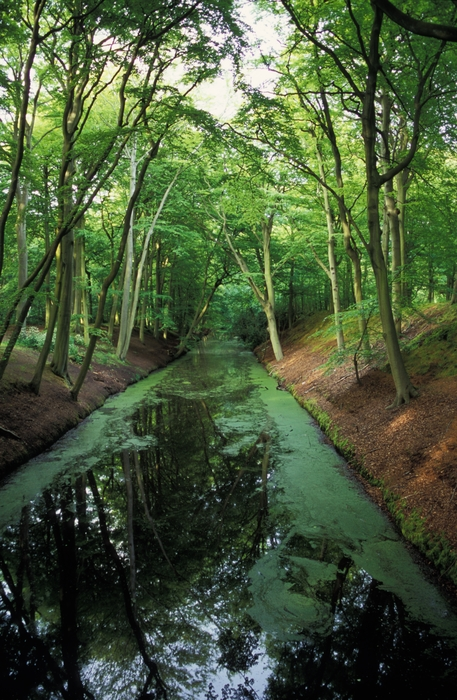
Clingendael Park

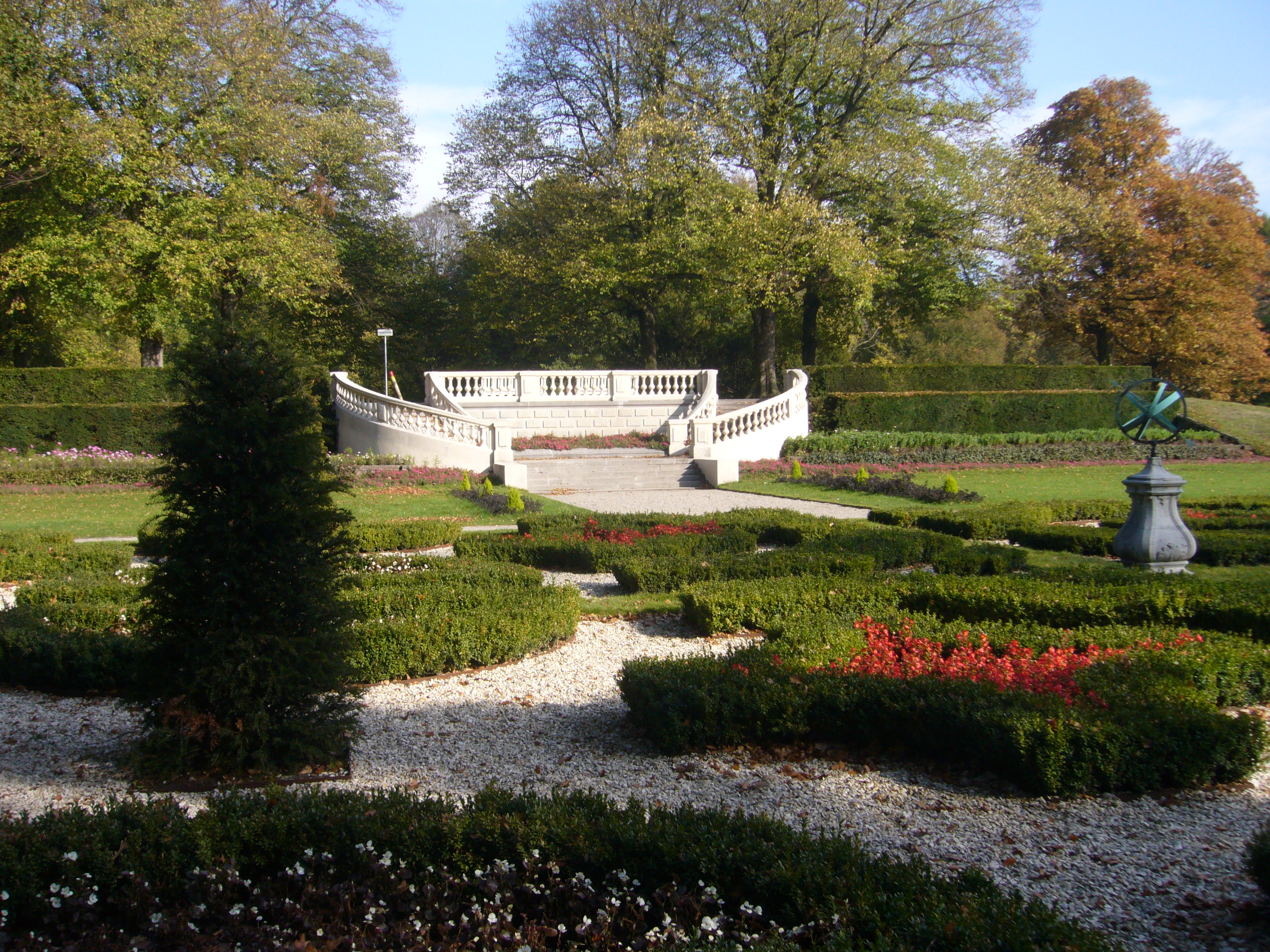
Dutch Garden
Japanese garden

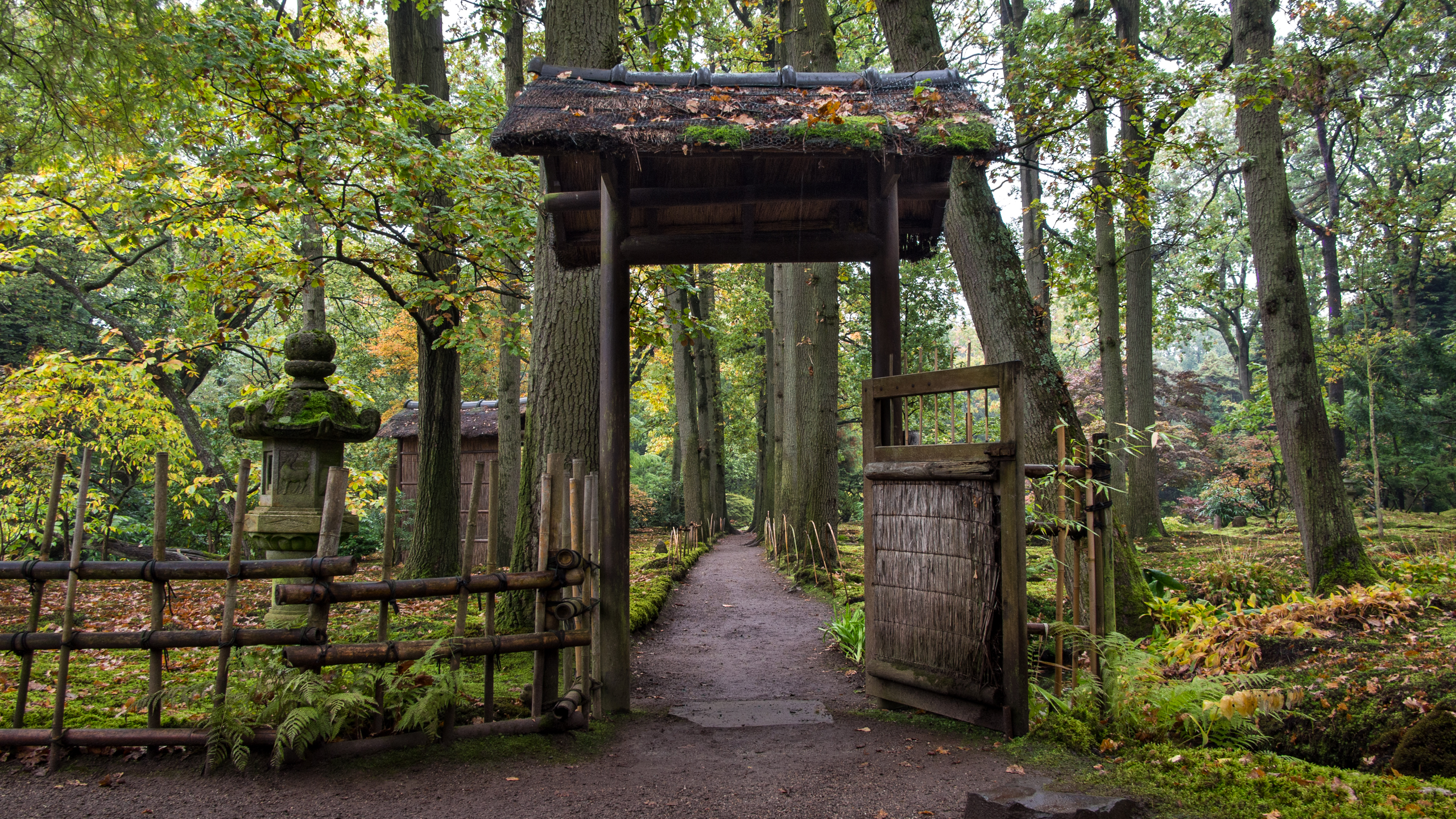
Entrance gate to the garden

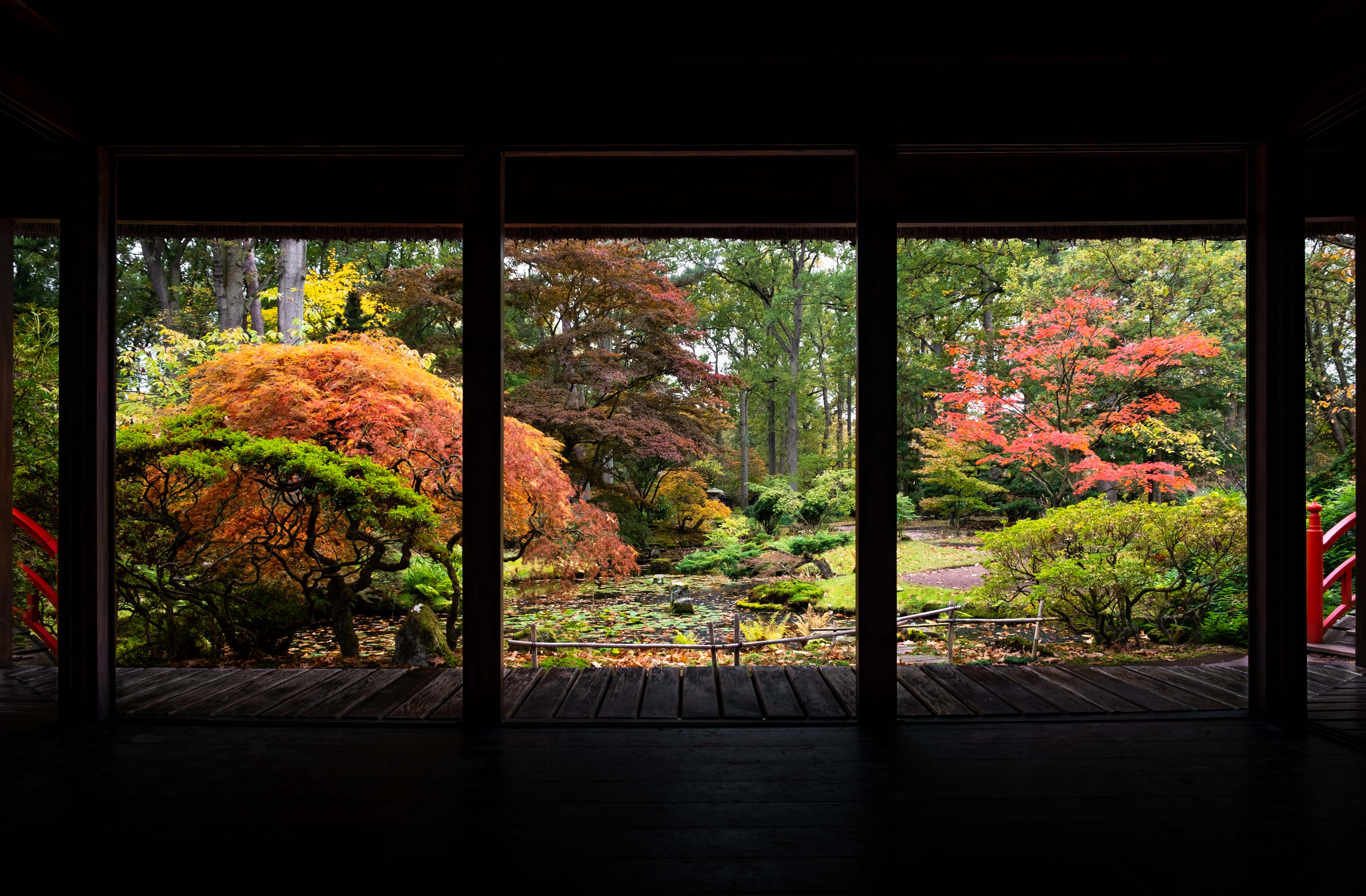
View from the pavilion in Autumn

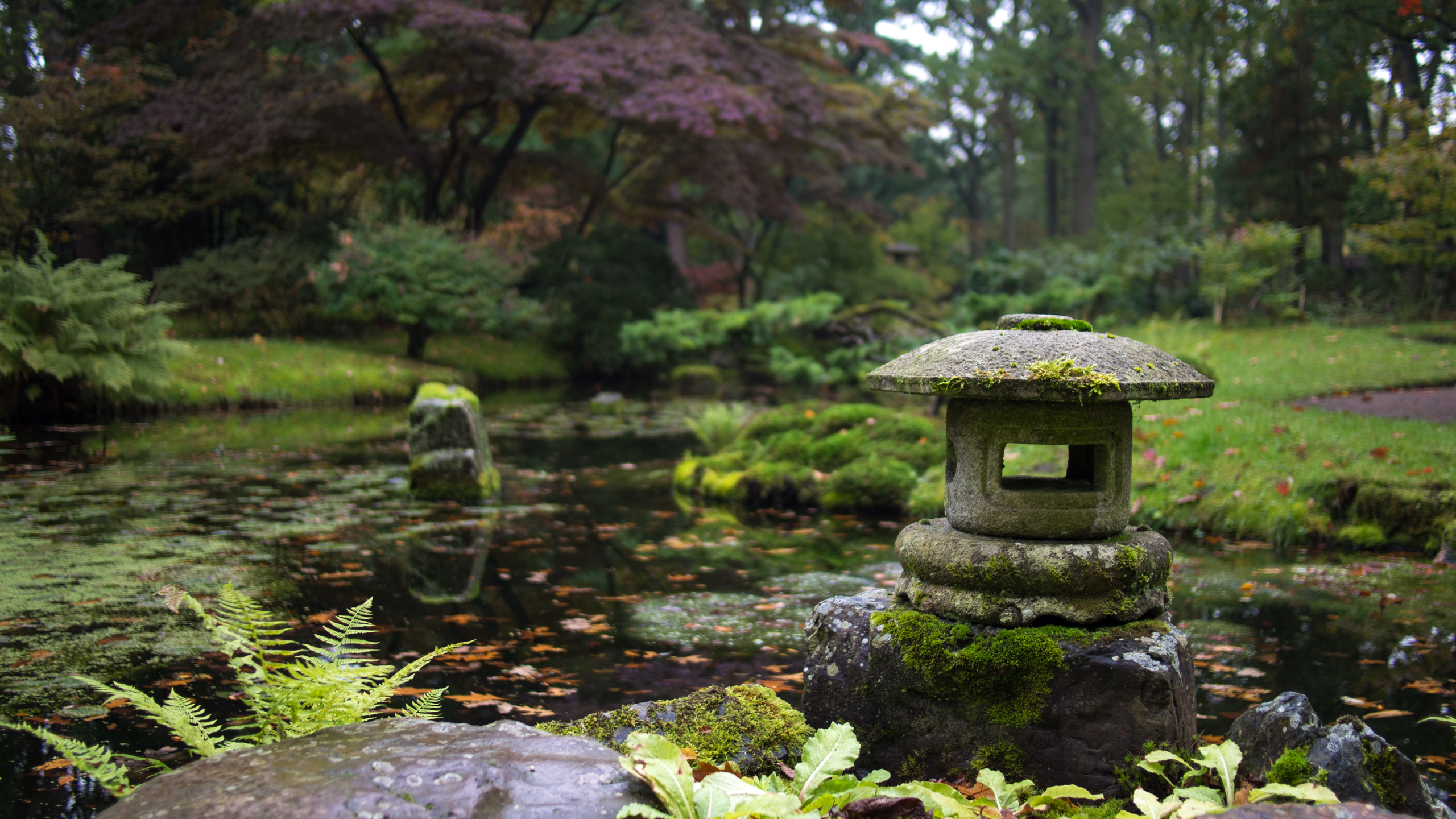
One of the many stone lanterns - tōrō - in the garden

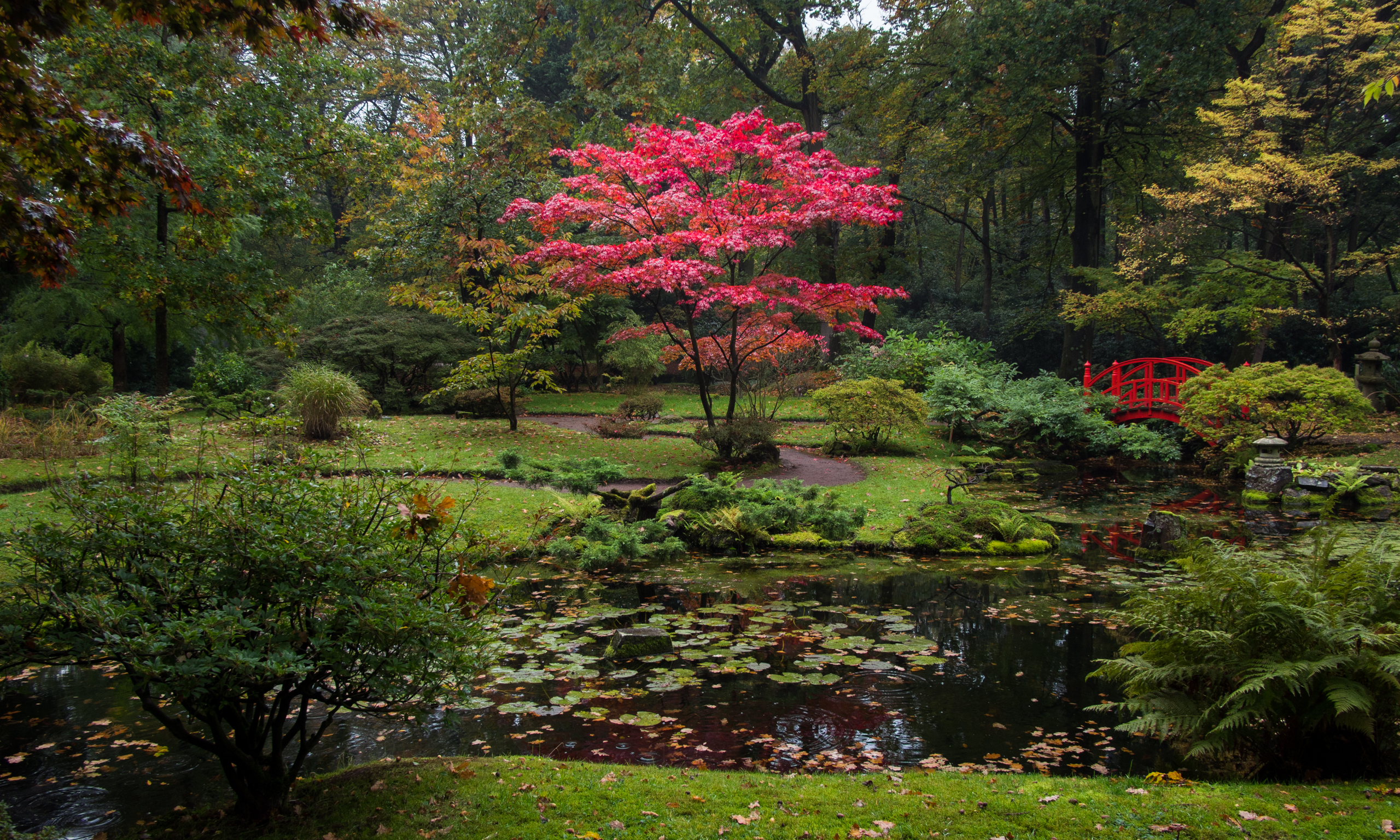
The red Acer palmatum was planted around 1910

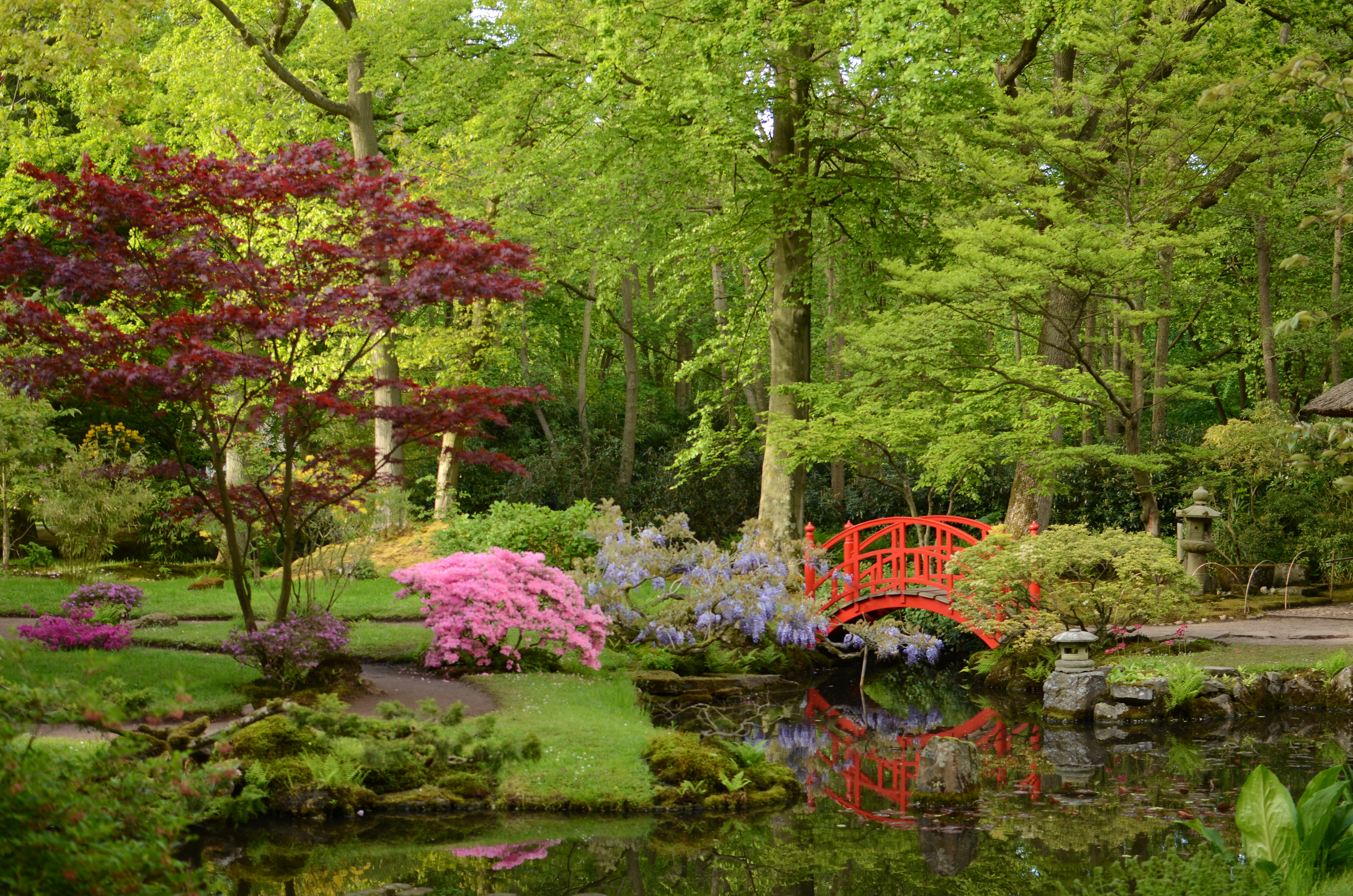
The garden in Spring

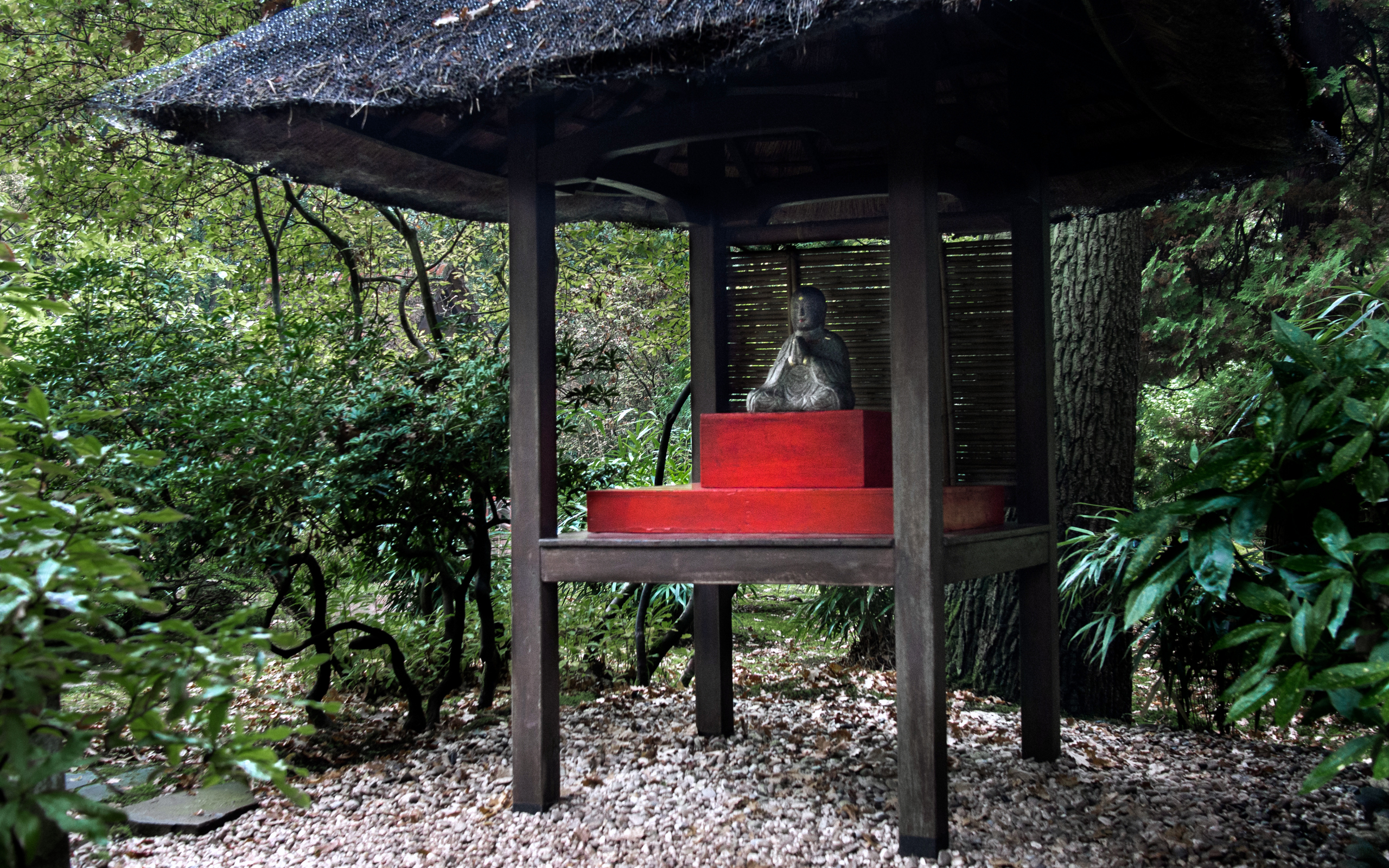
Small pavilion housing a statue of the Buddha
