= Kampioen =

Dutch general interest and family magazine

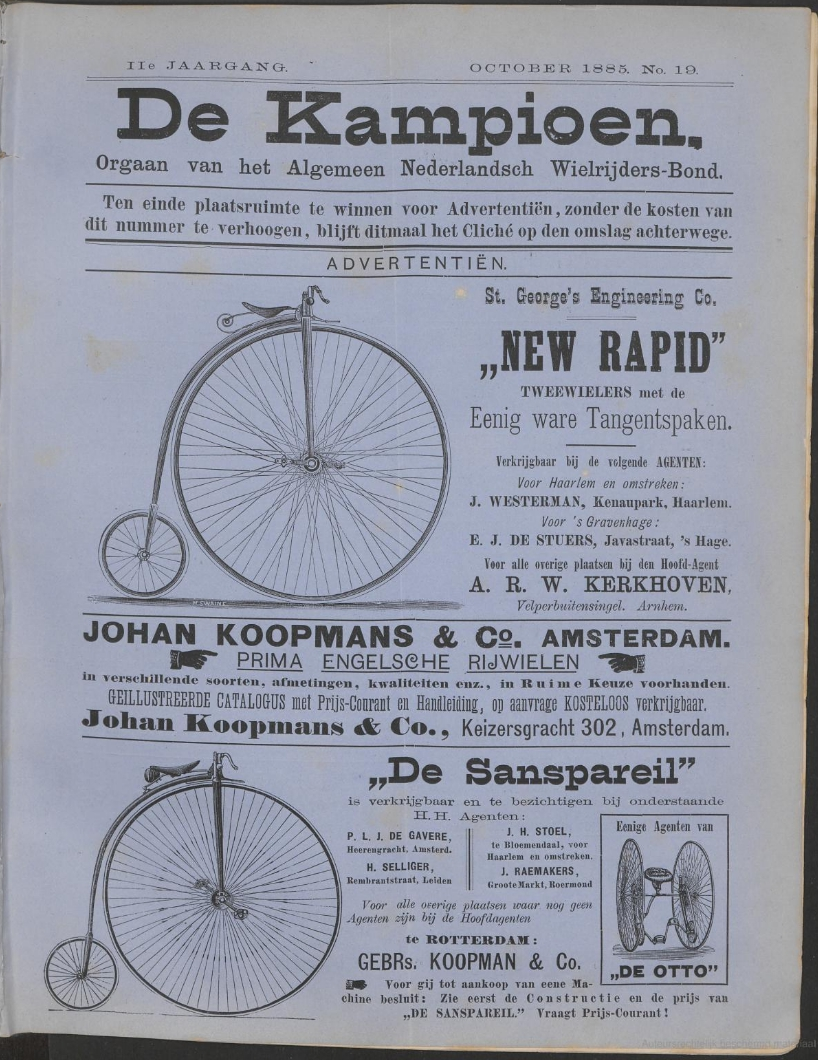
- October 1885 issue of the magazine
- Categories: Family magazine
- Frequency: Ten issues per year
- Circulation: 3.54 million (2013)
- Publisher: ANWB Media
- Founded: 1885; 140 years ago
- Company: Royal Dutch Touring Club (ANWB)
- Country: Netherlands
- Based in: The Hague
- Language: Dutch
- Website: Kampioen
- ISSN: 0022-8265
- OCLC: 1782568

Kampioen (Dutch: Champion) is a Dutch general interest and family magazine published in The Hague, the Netherlands. The magazine is one of the oldest and most read publications in the country.

== History and profile ==
Kampioen was established in 1885. The magazine is part of the Royal Dutch Touring Club (ANWB) and is published ten times a year by the ANWB media. The magazine has its headquarters in the Hague. Kampioen is a family magazine and features articles and news on recreation, tourism, traffic, transportation and the environment. It is freely distributed to the ANWB members.

== Circulation ==
In 2000 Kampioen had a circulation of 3,589,645 copies, making it the most read magazine in the country. In 2001 its circulation was 3,627,000 copies, making it the ninth top general interest magazine worldwide. In 2006 it was the largest seventh magazine worldwide with a circulation of 3,756,000 copies.

The circulation of Kampioen was 3,541,566 copies in 2010, making it the largest general interest magazine in Europe. Its circulation was 3,548,770 copies in 2011 and 3,540,991 copies in 2012. The magazine circulated 3.54 million copies in 2013. The circulation in 2017 had reduced to 3,400,248, still good for the first place among magazines in the Netherlands (Albert Heijn's free Allerhande was second at 2,019,978).

== See also ==
- List of magazines in the Netherlands
