= Libelle (Dutch magazine) =

Dutch weekly women's magazine

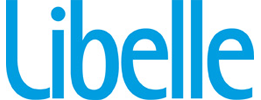
- Categories: Women's magazine; Lifestyle magazine
- Frequency: Weekly
- Circulation: 256,903 (2018)
- Publisher: DPG Media
- Founded: 1934
- First issue: 13 April 1934; 92 years ago
- Country: Netherlands
- Based in: Amsterdam
- Language: Dutch
- Website: Libelle

Libelle (from the Latin "libellus", meaning book or writ) is a weekly women's magazine published in Amsterdam, Netherlands. It has been in circulation since 1934.

== History and profile ==
Libelle was first published on 13 April 1934 by NV Uitgeverij. The magazine was part of VNU and was published by VNU Tijdschriften for several years. In 2001 the magazine became part of Sanoma and was published by Sanoma Media Netherlands B.V. on a weekly basis. It has its headquarters in Amsterdam.

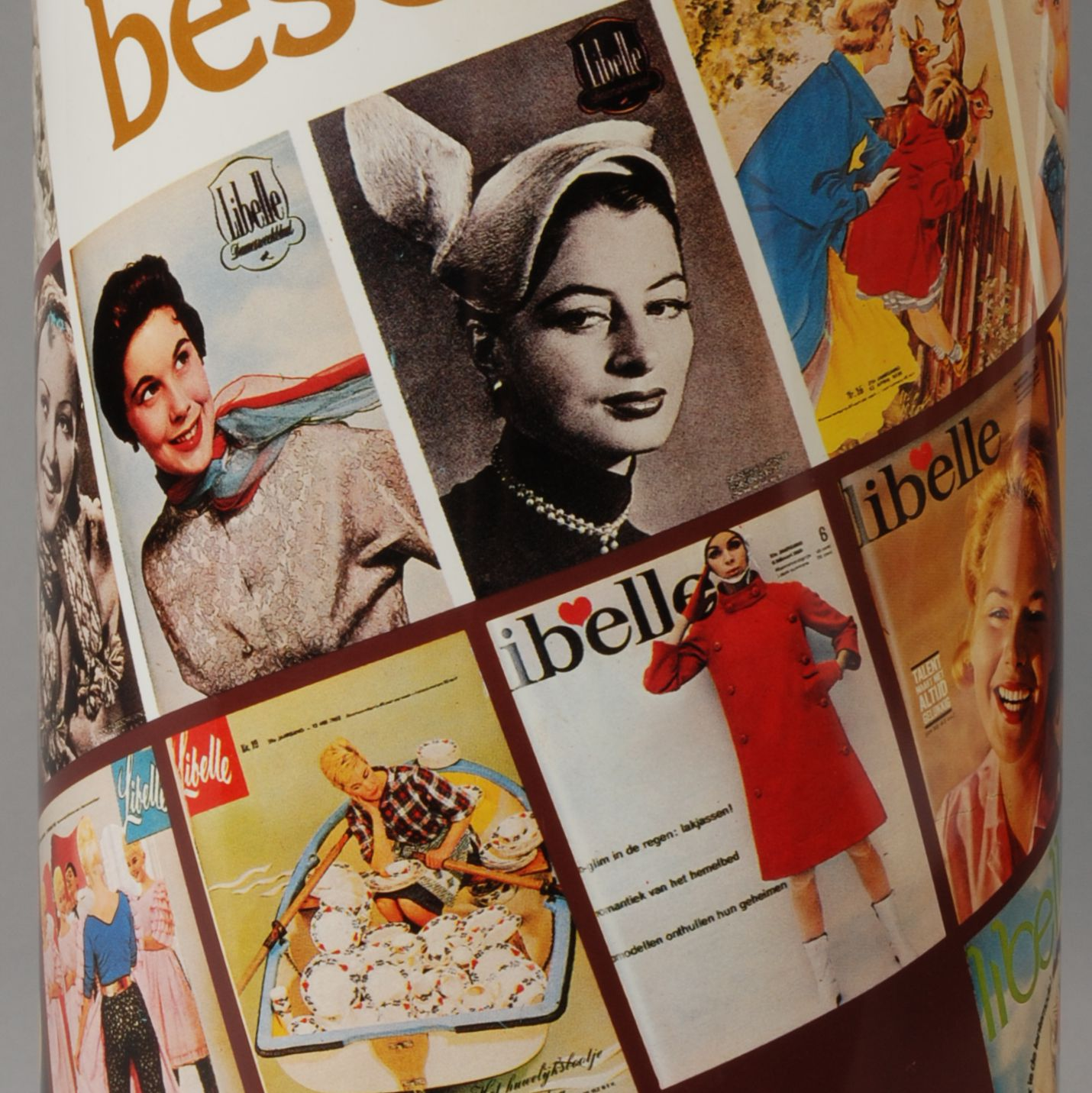
Covers of Libelle in the early years on a tin can from 1984–1985

Following the German occupation of the Netherlands during World War II the editors of Libelle endorsed support of the German forces. In the late 1960s another women's magazine, Beatrijs, merged with Libelle. During the 1990s Libelle was among the Dutch publications which functioned as an opinion leader in political and health-related issues.

The target audience of Libelle is women aged between 30–55 most of whom are average Dutch women. The weekly mostly features articles about fashion, beauty, culinary, travel, human interest, health, and work.

Franska Stuy served as the editor-in-chief of the magazine from 1999 until 2015, and as of 2015 Hilmar Mulder was in charge.

For the past 20 years Libelle has been organizing a week long outdoor event in May, the Libelle Zomerweek. In 2016 this event attracted 84,300 visitors.

The magazine has a Flemish edition with the same name, Libelle, published in Belgium. Although they are part of the same company, each magazine has an independent editorial board.

== Circulation ==
Libelle was the thirtieth best-selling women's magazine in 2001 globally with a circulation of 643,000 copies. By 2016 circulation fell to about 300,000 copies. It kept dropping since, at a rate of about 20,000 annually.

- 1990: 747,147
- 2000: 640,101
- 2003: 621,068
- 2009: 461,694
- 2010: 444,556
- 2011: 426,869
- 2012: 401,558
- 2013: 374,141
- 2014: 347,466
- 2015: 326,302
- 2016: 300,310
- 2017: 273,195
- 2018: 256,903

== See also ==
- List of magazines in the Netherlands
