= Johan Mutters =

Dutch architect (1858–1930)

Johannes Mutters, jr.
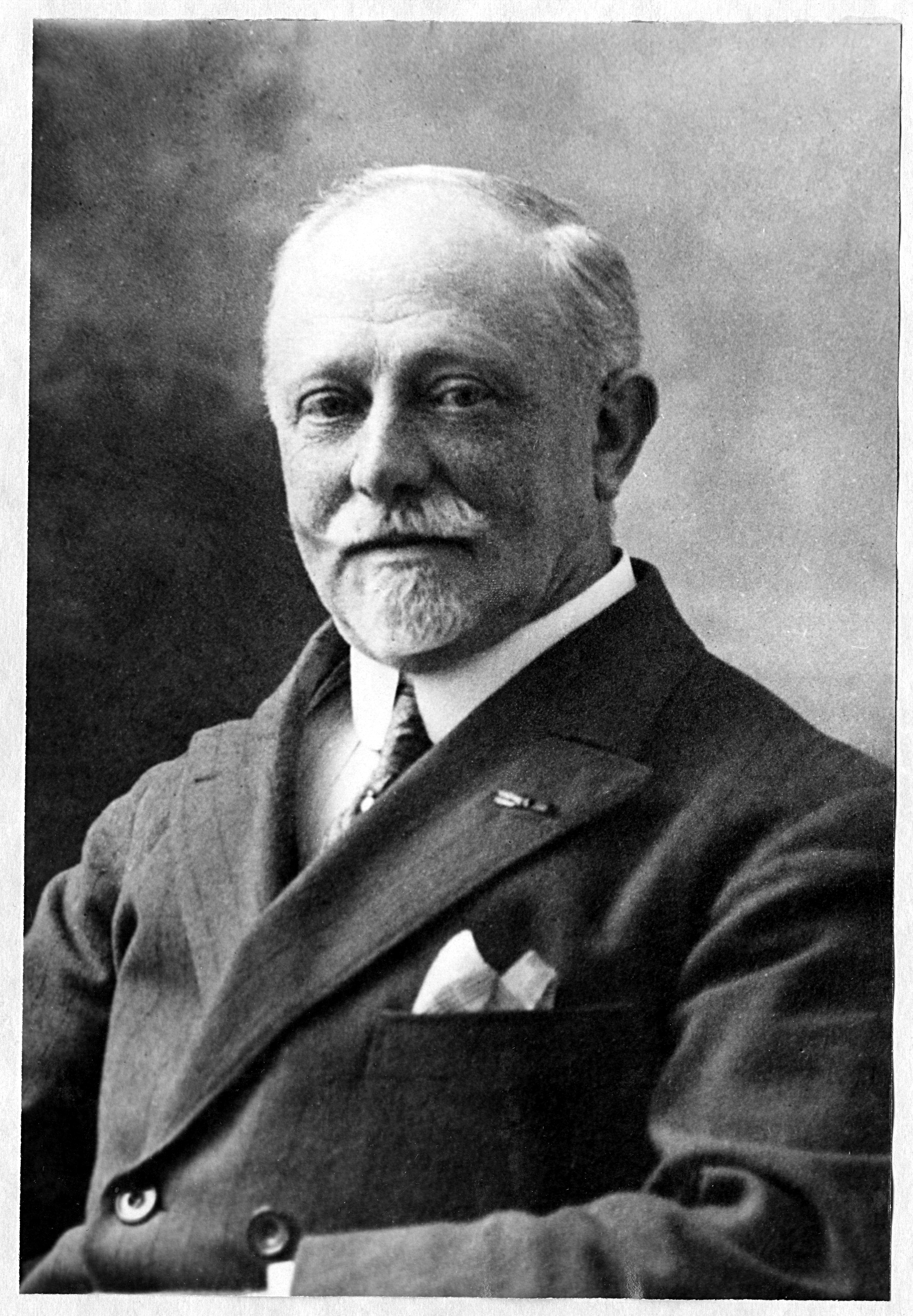
- Born: 6 November 1858; The Hague, Zuid Holland, Netherlands
- Died: 13 December 1930 (aged 72); Wassenaar, Zuid Holland, Netherlands
- Occupation: Architect
- Buildings: Grand Hotel Central; Apoteek Nanning; Zuid Hollandsch Koffiehuis; Hotel De Wittebrug; Nederlandsch Sportpark

Johannes Mutters, jr. (The Hague, 6 November 1858 – Wassenaar, 13 December 1930) was a Dutch architect, based in his hometown. He was chiefly known for his house designs and his involvement in the flourishing of Nieuwe Kunst (the Dutch strand of Art Nouveau or Jugendstil) in the early years of the twentieth century.

== Early life, family, and education ==
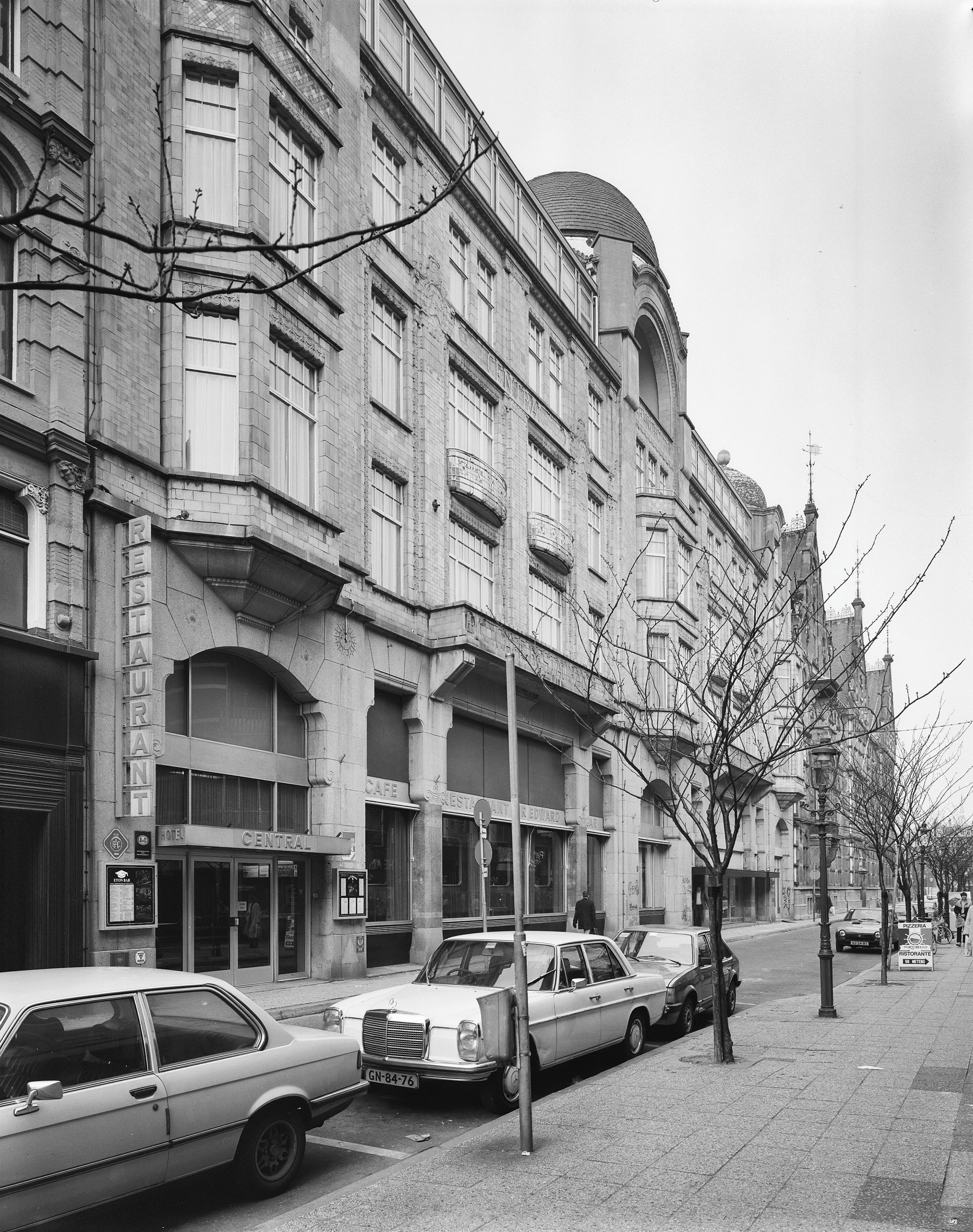
The Grand Hotel Central in The Hague is one of Mutters' best-known commissions.

Mutters was born in The Hague in 1858 as the son of Johannes Mutters (sr.), whose father was Herman Pieter Mutters (1797–1864), the founder of the Mutters carpentry and furniture factory on the Molenstraat, near the Koningspoort in The Hague. The firm was well known for its interiors under the leadership of Herman Pieter I to Herman Pieter V, successively. The H.P. Mutters company furnished luxury ships, offices, villas, the Peace Palace in The Hague, and exhibited at several international expositions. Johan Mutters would eventually collaborate regularly with his cousin Herman Pieter III (1855–1922) on designs at world's expositions (Paris 1900, Roubaix 1911), as well as industrial buildings.

Mutters was well-educated. When he finished high school in the 1870s, he began an apprenticeship with the architect C. Muysken, who was then building the Kasteel Oud Wassenaar; at the same time, he took night classes at the Academie van Beeldende Kunsten (Academy of Visual Arts) in The Hague. He embarked on a study trip in 1881, then transferred to the Academie van Beeldende Kunsten in Antwerp, before establishing his own firm in The Hague.

On 16 June 1887 he married Maria Catharina Brouwer (1862–1934) of Rotterdam.

== Eclecticism and the Nieuwe Kunst ==
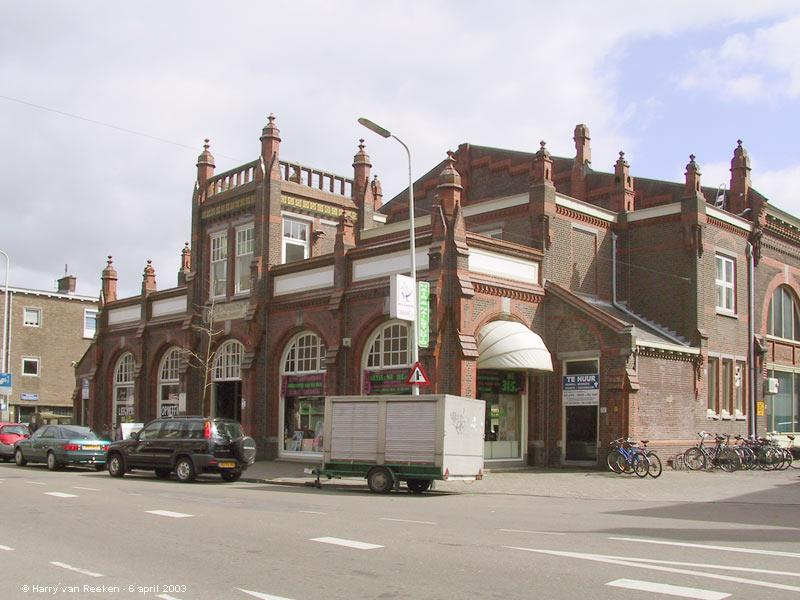
Nederlandsch Sportpark in The Hague, another of Mutters' better commissions.

The talented and skilled Mutters, who had become familiar with the various trends in architectural practice of the era and begun to make extensive social contacts, attracted numerous clients in the 1880s. He began his career working in various revivalist styles, often eclectically combining them, like most architects of the late Victorian era. An early example is the Zuid Hollands Koffiehuis on the Groenmarkt in The Hague (1890), where he used a Northern Dutch Renaissance style.

However, Mutters belonged to a group of architects from The Hague who were looking for innovative architectural styles and materials, like many architects all over Europe and North America around the turn of the century. He was quick to notice the appearance of Art Nouveau internationally, and with his design for the Lensvelt-Nicola Building at Venestraat 27–29 (1895) he is sometimes credited as the man who introduced the Nieuwe Kunst to the city, followed soon afterwards by the building at Hoogstraat 30 (1897). With its unorthodox emphasis on curvilinear forms and brightly colored materials, the Nieuwe Kunst soon became a popular style for many commercial establishments.

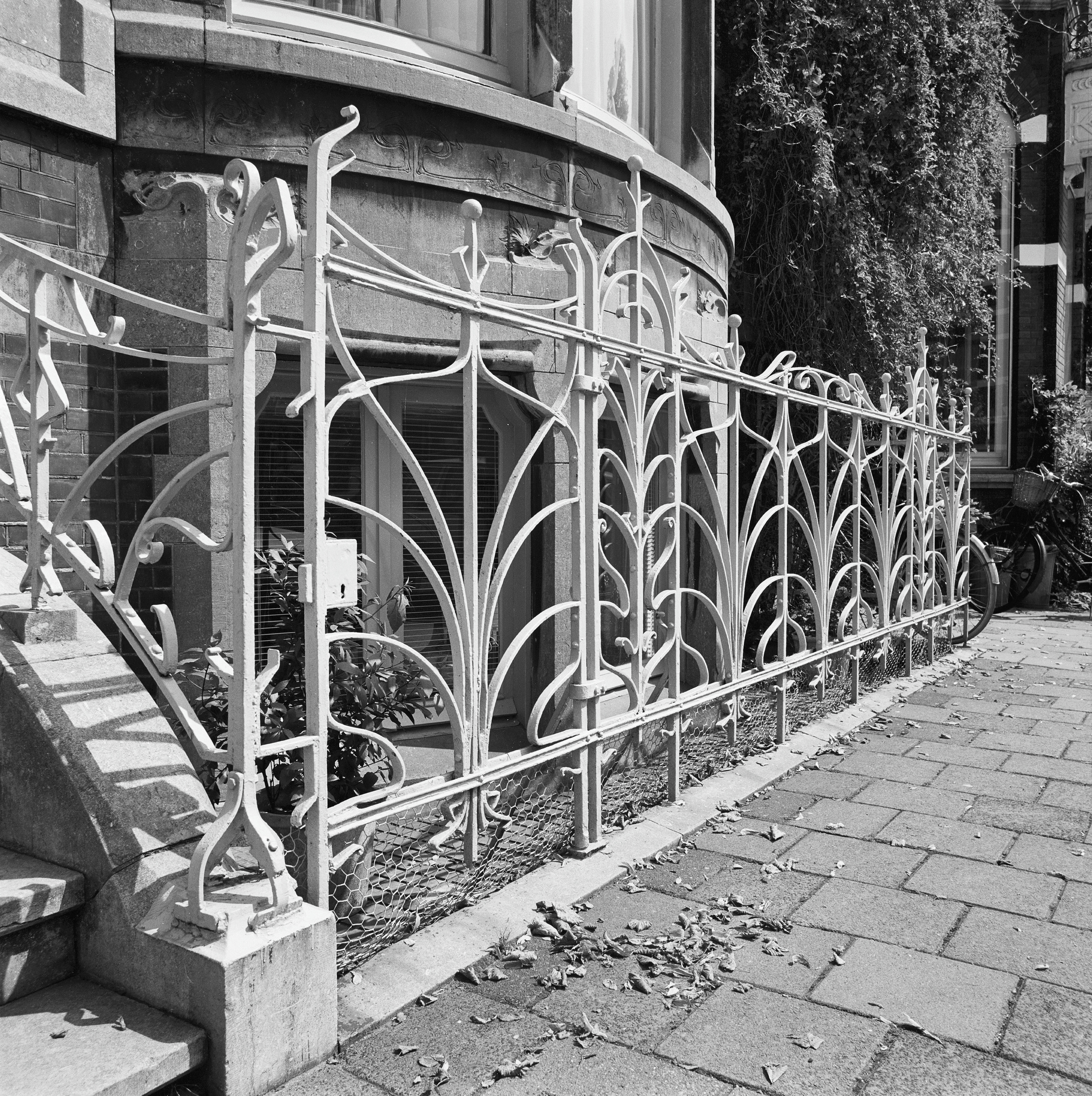
Detail of the house at Jan van Nassaustraat 35 in The Hague, designed by Mutters in 1893.

A slew of commissions soon came Mutters’ way, and he eventually became involved in the designs and renovations of several hotels, shops, offices, a sports park, theaters, and factories, mostly in The Hague and in Schveningen. Probably the best of these was the house he built for his family at 13 Wassenaarseweg in The Hague in 1896. The facade was decorated with Art Nouveau floral motifs and a spacious stairwell built around the hall, not unlike the domestic designs of Victor Horta in Brussels. Sadly, the building was demolished during World War II.

About the same time, Mutters expanded the home of the literary group Sociëteit de Witte on the Plein in 1897–98 with a new wing whose façade copies the original austere neoclassical design by Cornelis Outshoorn, but Mutters was allowed to decorate employ Nieuwe Kunst for the interior. At the 1900 Exposition Universelle in Paris, he showed his design for a house at 35 Jan van Nassaustraat in The Hague, where his choice of the English Tudor style is complemented by Jugendstil details both at the entrance and at the gates. Details between the natural stone bands at the top facade seen in the design have disappeared, however. Also at the fair, with Karel Sluyterman, Mutters designed the Dutch pavilion in a striking Nieuwe Kunst design with multiple spires and lacy window surrounds and spandrels.

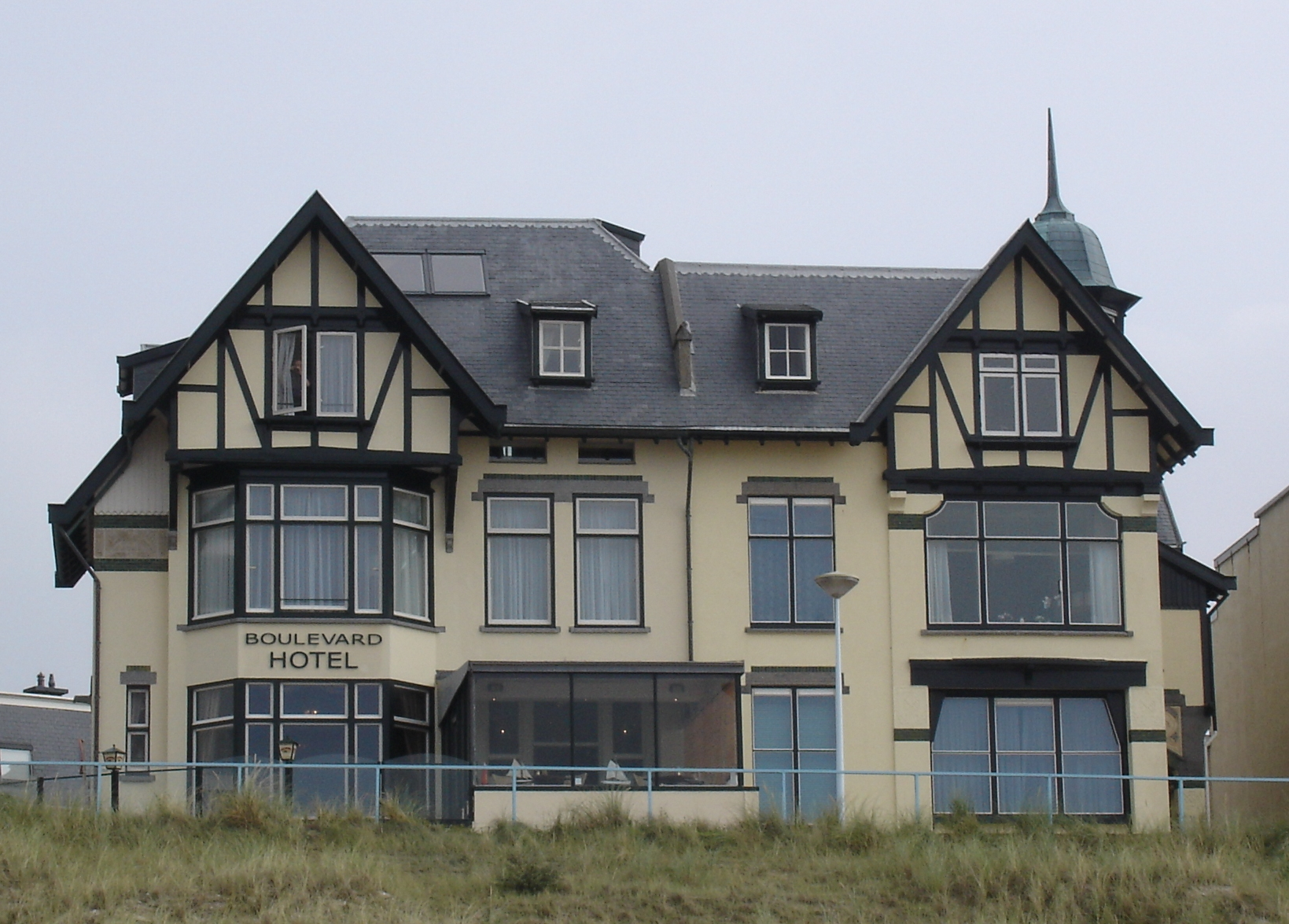
The Boulevard Hotel, originally a villa called the Casa Maria, is one of Mutters' surviving domestic designs.

Fashion changed quickly, however, and Mutters largely abandoned Nieuwe Kunst by the end of the next decade. In 1908–09 he built an imposing structure on the corner of de Kneuterdijk and de Plaats for the Kühne company in a style largely influenced by French baroque architecture. The facade has brick panels wedged between natural stone pilasters, along with the familiar classical vocabularies of cornices and decorative vases. He soon changed tack again, moving towards the rationalist designs of Hendrik Petrus Berlage, the most famous Dutch architect of the time. This can be seen in the large set of offices he was commissioned to design for two insurance companies on the corner of Anna Pauwlonastraat in 1911 and in the offices he designed in 1912–13 for the Haagsche Assurantie Compagnie on Bezuidenhoutseweg, both in The Hague. That year, 1913, he also finished the Grand Hotel Central on the Lange Poten, a building now used by the Tweede Kamer, the Dutch House of Representatives.

Mutters’ success meant his office grew in the number of employees, as well, attracting some talented names. In 1914 Jan Wils became an apprentice draftsman for Mutters, but would leave to set up his own office two years later and become a member of De Stijl; he would go on to design the Olympic Stadium in Amsterdam for the 1928 games.

== De Kievet, Kiwevietsduin, and Wildrust ==
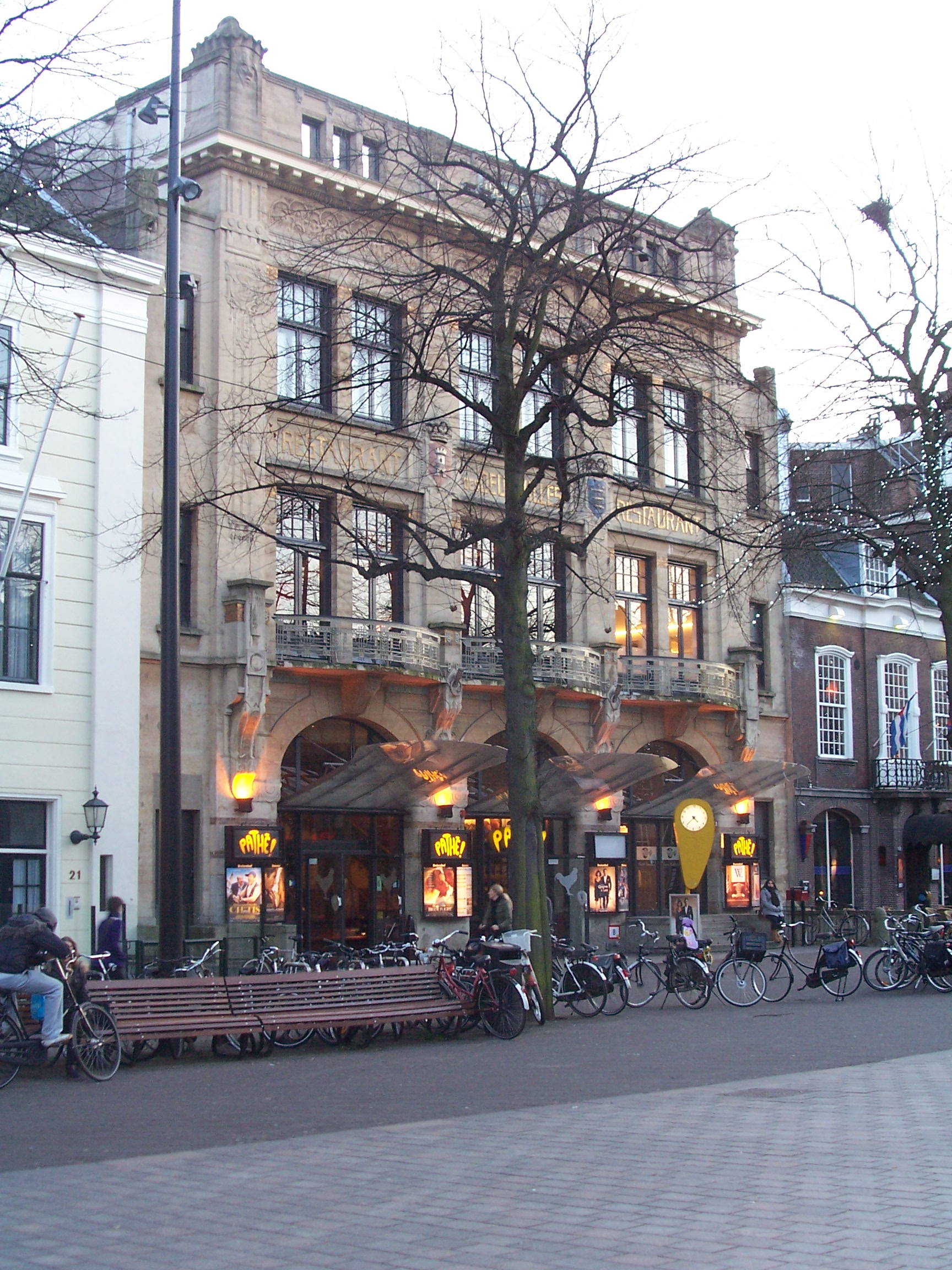
The Pathé Buitenhof in The Hague, a cinema, was originally a café built by Mutters in 1904–06.

Mutters was attracted to the ideas of the Garden City Movement as developed by Ebenezer Howard at the dawn of the twentieth century. Suburban development beyond The Hague attracted many investors, including Mutters, who was a shareholder in the three joint-stock companies "Exploitatie Maatschappij Park de Kieviet," "Wildrust" and "Kievietsduin," and he drew up the plans for these communities and designed many of their buildings between 1914 and his death sixteen years later. Mutters’ plans for the communities respected the contours and elements of the natural environment, particularly the ponds and trees, with curving roads that created an irregular layout and intersected at squares.

The most noteworthy of the three is De Kievet, formally in Waasenaar, where Mutters designed several houses using numerous variations of the modest English cottage, undoubtedly an homage to the well-established British Garden City model. In general, the masonry structures with overhanging eaves were sheltered by thatched roofs and distinguished by their central halls that radiated a sense of warmth and security. More luxurious dwellings included terraces, conservatories and balconies that overlooked gardens. One of the first houses Mutters built in the area was his family's own, called “Berkenhof” after its address at Berklaan 1, a stately but old-fashioned building into which the Mutterses moved in 1915. In all, Mutters built 38 houses in the new development, of which 30 have survived; his house is not one of these, having been demolished in 1975. Another demolished Mutters design is the villa called “’t Hoveke,” formerly located at Waldeck Pyrmontlaan 33, the home of the architect's cousin H.P. Mutters. Mutters also built the local Kievetschool in 1922, a picturesque yet homely brick structure.

Eventually, in the 1920s, Mutters was asked to develop a master plan for the municipality of Waasenaar, into which he invested a significant amount of time and effort, ultimately projecting population growth into a city of 500,000 residents, a rather unlikely prospect. The town council initially agreed to implement it, but the unrealistic projections of Mutters’ proposal forced them to rescind their decision a few years later.
