= Beatrijs (magazine) =

Dutch Catholic weekly magazine for women

Beatrijs: Katholiek weekblad voor de vrouw was a Dutch Catholic weekly magazine for women. Founded in 1939, it was taken over by Libelle in 1967.

== History, content ==
Beatrijs, referred to as the first Catholic magazine for women in the country, was founded on 5 January 1939 as a "typical" traditional women's magazine, resembling Margriet and Libelle, with articles on fashion, cooking, home and family life. Compared to the other two magazines, content in Beatrijs was more modest, and did not feature such clothes as short skirts and low-cut blouses. Libelle and Beatrijs were both published by De Spaarnestad and had the same fashion photographs and patterns, but for Beatrijs these were always supplied with an additional collar or a lower hemline. Attention was paid to religious holidays, and B. G. Henning, a Catholic priest, wrote a weekly column on a religious topic. Other columns were written by leading Catholic figures, including Anne Biegel. The magazine considered motherhood a blessing and a calling, an ideology it shared with other such magazines.

At its first appearance already the resemblance between Beatrijs and Libelle was noted, supported by the fact that both were published by the same press, and the suggestion was made that Beatrijs was published only to push Marijke, the somewhat similar bi-weekly publication of the Association of Roman Catholic Women's Organizations.

Before World War II Beatrijs was printed soberly and on cheap paper, in black and white. During World War II the magazine appeared biweekly for a while, and then was shut down by the German occupiers, last appearing on 1 January 1942. It came back in circulation on 3 May 1946, until 9 December 1967, when it was taken over by Libelle. In 1963 it had a circulation of over 89,000; by 1967 that had dropped to 60,000. Chief editor from 1946 on was C. P. M. Lautenslager, with E. G. H. Bornewasser; after 1967 D. Hendrikse was chief editor.
