= Opinio =

Dutch weekly magazine

Opinio was a Dutch weekly magazine which was briefly published between 2007 and 2008. The magazine was headquartered in Amsterdam, the Netherlands.

== History ==
Opinio was first appeared on 18 January 2007. The magazine ceased operations and declared bankruptcy on 3 June 2008. The number of subscribers at that point was 5000, which was not economically sustainable.

The magazine was an initiative of former Trouw editor Jaffe Vink. It appeared in tabloid format (16 pages), and was printed on pink paper. It did not contain any advertisements, nor pictures or editorial cartoons. The magazine described itself as left wing-conservative. The headquarters of the magazine which was published weekly on Fridays was in Amsterdam.

Opinio was largely funded by IT-entrepreneur Roel Pieper. Among its many contributors were Ayaan Hirsi Ali, Paul Cliteur, Afshin Ellian, Derk Jan Eppink and Bart Jan Spruyt and Douglas Murray.

== Incidents ==
In 2008, Dutch prime minister Jan Peter Balkenende started legal proceedings against the magazine due to its claim that Balkanende had described Islam as a problem. He lost the case.
