= Ajax Magazine =

Dutch sports magazine

- Hoofdredacteur: Michel Sleutelberg
- Categories: Sports magazine
- Frequency: 8/season
- Publisher: Tema
- First issue: February 1986
- Company: AFC Ajax N.V.
- Country: Netherlands
- Based in: Amsterdam
- Language: Dutch
- OCLC: 73043394

Ajax Magazine is a Dutch bimonthly sports magazine published in Amsterdam, focusing on the association football club AFC Ajax with 8 issues appearing per season. It was established in 1986 and ran for 20 years with its first edition appearing in February 1986 with Marco van Basten on the cover. The 2006/07 season marked the final season of the printed magazine.

In 2011, the magazine was relaunched in digital format as the Ajax iMagazine available as a free download from the AFC Ajax website, in order to supply the demand for emerging digital handheld technology.

== History ==
Ajax Magazine was established in 1986 by association football club AFC Ajax to provide a bimonthly magazine surrounding the Dutch club. The first issue of the magazine appeared in February 1986 and had Marco van Basten on the cover. The magazine would go on to appear with 8 issues a year for 20 years before shutting down operations following the 2006/07 season. The magazine would follow a format of introducing a presentation guide for the season as its first issue, until the 12th year, when the presentation guide was released independently from the 8 issues which appear during the course of the season. From 2001 to 2007, the editor-in-chief was Michel Sleutelberg.

== See also ==
- 1900 magazine
- Ajax-nieuws
