= Ajax-nieuws =

Dutch sports magazine (1917–1987)

- Categories: Sports magazine
- Frequency: 12 per year
- First issue: 1917
- Final issue: 1987
- Company: AFC Ajax
- Country: Netherlands
- Based in: Amsterdam
- Language: Dutch
- OCLC: 73057191

Ajax-nieuws - clubblad van de Amsterdamsche Football Club "Ajax" (Dutch, "Ajax-news - club magazine of the Amsterdam Football Club "Ajax") was a Dutch monthly sports magazine published in Amsterdam, focusing on the association football club AFC Ajax with 12 issues appearing per season. It was established in 1917 and ran for 70 years with its first edition appearing in 1917 with an Ajax team photo on the cover. The 1986/87 season marked the final season of the printed magazine, as it was replaced by the bimonthly publication Ajax Magazine.

== History ==
Ajax-nieuws was established in 1917 by association football club AFC Ajax to provide a monthly magazine surrounding the Dutch club under then chairman Willem Egeman. The first issue of the magazine appeared in 1917 and had a photograph of the team on the cover. The magazine would go on to appear with 12 issues a year for 70 years before shutting down operations following the 1986/87 season. The magazine was briefly put on hold during both World War I and World War II, when it was illegal to print, but the publication resumed soon after. Every 10 years the club would publish a special anniversary edition of the magazine, with additional pages highlighting the events of the decade circulating around the club.

== See also ==
- History of AFC Ajax
- 1900 magazine
