= 1900 (magazine) =

Dutch bi-monthly sports magazine

- Chief-Editor: Joost de Jong
- Categories: Sports magazine
- Frequency: Bi-Monthly
- Publisher: Rob Koghee
- Founded: 1900 (Officially licensed by Ajax)
- First issue: 20 December 2012; 13 years ago
- Company: AFC Ajax N.V. (Ajax)
- Country: Netherlands
- Based in: Amsterdam
- Language: Dutch
- ISSN: 2214-1138
- OCLC: 823859031

1900 is a Dutch bi-monthly sports magazine published in Amsterdam, focusing on the association football club AFC Ajax. It was founded in 2012 with its first edition appearing on 20 December 2012.

== History ==
1900 magazine was created in 2012 by AFC Ajax N.V. and Blue Flower Media to provide a bi-monthly journal surrounding the Dutch association football club AFC Ajax from Amsterdam. The name of the magazine is derived from the founding year of the club, which was first officially registered on 18 March 1900. The first issue appeared on 20 December 2012 and had former Ajax player and head coach at the time Frank de Boer on the cover. The Chief-Editor of the magazine is Joost De Jong, who had previously been an editor for AD Sportwereld, and the editor in chief for NLCOACH.

== People on the cover ==
Nr.	Date	Person(s)/Object	Caption
1.	20 December 2012	Frank de Boer	Ik volg altijd mijn Eigen weg. (English: I always follow my own path.)
2.	17 March 2013	Siem de Jong	Laatste jaar bij Ajax? (English: Last year at Ajax?)
3.	16 May 2013	Frank de Boer and Toby Alderweireld	Kampioenen! Wij zijn de beste! (English: Champions! We are the best!)
4.	15 August 2013	Frank de Boer, Daley Blind, Bojan Krkić, Kolbeinn Sigþórsson, Ricardo van Rhijn and Mike van der Hoorn	Ajax, klaar voor de volgende titel! (English: Ajax, ready for the next title!)
5.	14 October 2013	Edwin van der Sar	Ajax wil weer naar de Europese top. (English: Ajax wants to summit again.)
6.	7 December 2013	Frank de Boer and Ronald de Boer	Onze filosofie levert resultaat op. (English: Our philosophy is paying off.)
7.	21 February 2014	Davy Klaassen	Eindelijk fit en messcherp. (English: Finally fit and sharp as a knife.)
8.	30 April 2014	Daley Blind and Frank de Boer	Vierde titel op een rij! (English: Fourth title in a row!)
9.	8 August 2014	Frank de Boer, Ricardo van Rhijn, Davy Klaassen, Daley Blind, Nicolai Boilesen, Richairo Zivkovic and Jasper Cillessen	Het Seizoen 2014–2015 (English: The 2014–2015 Season)
10.	7 October 2014	Ricardo van Rhijn	Van talent tot nieuwe leider (English: From talent to new leader)
11.	19 December 2014	Jasper Cillessen	Edwin van der Sar is mijn absolute held (English: From talent to new leader)
12.	26 February 2015	Davy Klaassen	Ik wil iets moois opbouwen met Ajax (English: I want to build something beautiful with Ajax)
13.	7 May 2015	Frank de Boer	Ajax is een obsessie geworden (English: Ajax has become an obsession)
14.	27 August 2015	John Heitinga	De band met Ajax is voor eeuwig (English: The tie with Ajax is forever)
15.	22 October 2015	Joël Veltman	Wij pakken de titel (English: We take the title)
16.	16 December 2015	Viktor Fischer	Ik kom sterker terug (English: I will return stronger)
17.	25 February 2016	Riechedly Bazoer	De Nieuwe Leider (English: The New Leader)
—	1 April 2016	Johan Cruijff	1947–2016 (Special Edition)
18.	12 May 2016	Arek Milik	Eindelijk weer een scorende spits (English: Finally a scoring striker again)
19.	11 August 2016	Peter Bosz	Mooi voetbal en winnen, het kan echt samen! (English: Beautiful football and winning, both are possible!)
20.	20 October 2016	Hakim Ziyech	De Nieuwe Verlosser (English: The New Distributor)
21.	15 December 2016	Kasper Dolberg	Deens Supertalent (English: Danish Super Talent)
22.	23 February 2017	Lasse Schöne	Talent alleen is niet genoeg (English: Talent alone is not enough)

== Staff ==
=== Editors ===
- Jan Cees Butter (2012–present)
- Maarten Dekker (2012–present)
- David Endt (2012–present)
- Sander van Hal (2013–present)
- Robert Heukels (2012–present)
- Mark van den Heuvel (2013–present)
- Joost de Jong (2012–present)
- Dominic King (2013–present)
- Nik Kok (2012–present)
- Hein de Kort (2012–present)
- Ronald Kres (2013–present)
- Diana Kuip (2013–present)
- Menno Pot (2013–present)
- Martijn Reijnink (2012–present)
- Eric Verweij (2012–present)
- Rob Willemse (2012–present)
- Martin van Zaanen (2013–present)

=== Chief-editors ===
Chief Editor	Editor From	Editor To
Joost de Jong	2012	present

== See also ==
- AFC Ajax
- Ajax Magazine
- Ajax-nieuws
