= LGBTQ culture in Liverpool =

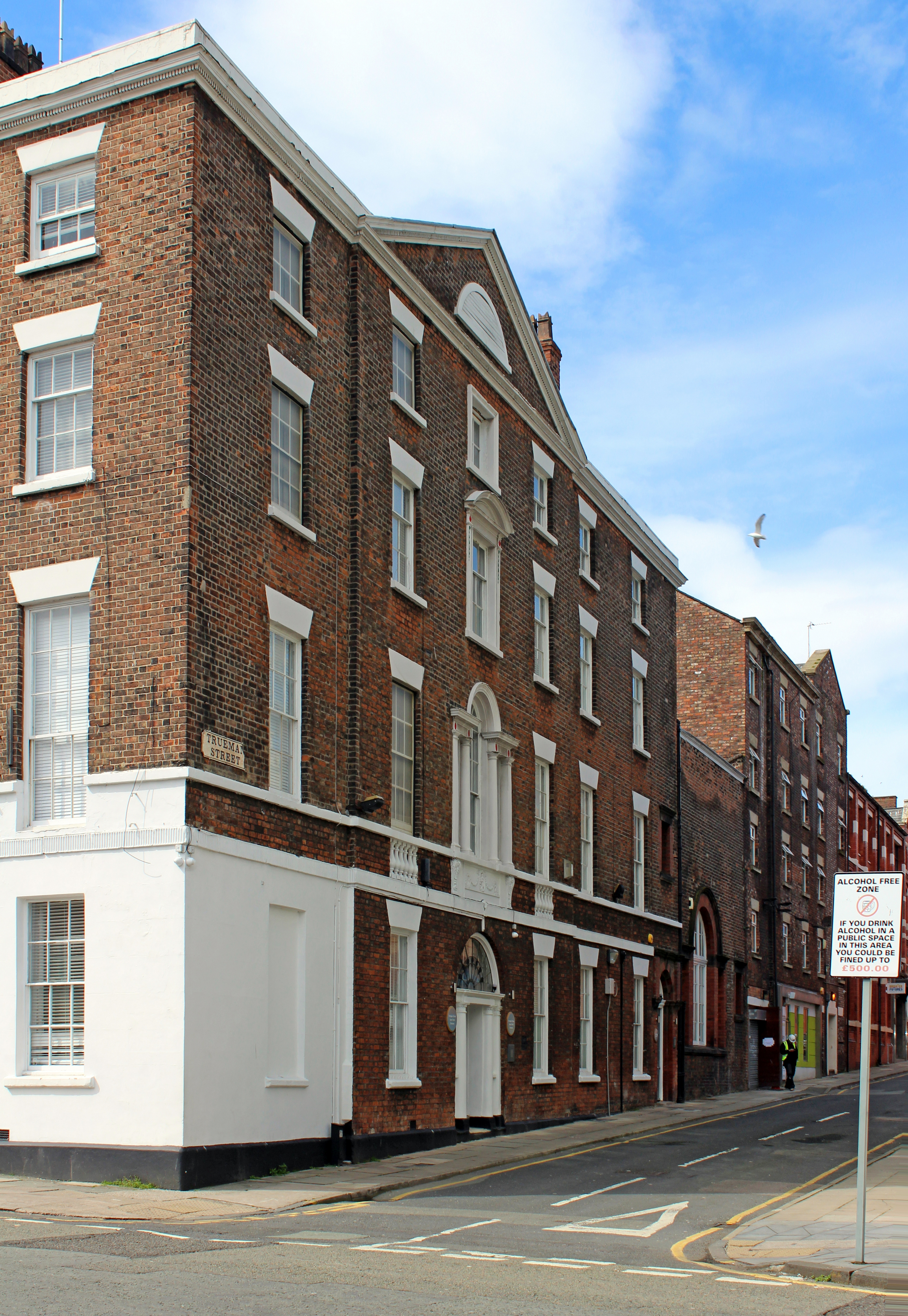
Trueman Street today showing Georgian era buildings from the 1790s. This was the street where Thomas Rix met an acquaintance called John Barron in a tavern for gay sex.

LGBT culture in Liverpool, England has a recorded history since the 18th century. Many historic LGBT firsts and pioneering moments in the LGBT rights movement either took place in Liverpool or were achieved by citizens of the city.

== Prominence in the UK and Northern England ==
As part of one of the largest cities in the United Kingdom, Liverpool's LGBT community is widely acknowledged as one of the most active and prominent in the country. In 2017, Liverpool was voted number 51 most LGBT friendly city in the world. The poll was taken by the gay community in major hubs around the world.

The city is the location of Britain's first and only official gay quarter, the only LGBT combined arts organisation in Northern England, the UK's most gay friendly university and one of Europe's largest free LGBT Pride festivals.

In recent years, Liverpool's LGBT community has been at the focus of global attention. Liverpool hosted the Eurovision Song Contest 2023 which led to a significant number of international LGBT tourists visiting the city.

In July 2023, Pride in Liverpool officially hosted the Pride parade on behalf of Kyiv, the capital city of Ukraine. Kyiv was unable to host the event due to sustained military invasion and occupation through the escalation of the Russo-Ukrainian War.

== 18th century ==
The history of gay and LGBT Liverpool is one full of contrasts and contradictions from larger than life characters, legendary gay clubs and relative tolerance, to the anonymous and underground subculture of cottaging, repression and outright persecution. As a commercial city and major port, the history is long and manifold. The earliest experiences of homosexuality can be traced back to the Georgian era when Liverpool was growing rapidly in population and stature, right through to its height as second city of the British Empire during Queen Victoria's reign.

In England, sex between men was punishable by death until 1861 under the Buggery Act 1533.

In summer 1806, twenty four men aged 17 to 84 from in and around Warrington, Manchester, and Liverpool were arrested for sodomy and other homosexual offences (three men were from Liverpool: Aspinall, Denton, and Smith and were all acquitted). Nine of the men were eventually tried by magistrates John Borron and Richard Gwillym at the Lancaster assizes. The trials became known collectively as the "Remarkable Trials", a reference to a pamphlet of the same name published shortly afterwards.

After the executions of three men, the two magistrates decided to investigate the scale of, and clamp down on, further homosexual offences in the region. They relied heavily on the interviews, statements and confessions of a Manchester artisan named Thomas Rix. During his testimonies, Rix spoke of his life and sexual experiences in Liverpool in the 1790s, suggesting that sodomy was widespread in the town. Rix spoke of homosexuals congregating in the ropewalk which led from Whitechapel and Dale Street.

According to Rix, most of his homosexual encounters with other men were casual and took place in streets, taverns and pubs. He made particular reference to a tavern "kept by a widow woman in Trueman Street at the bottom of Dale Street in Liverpool."

Acquaintances and sexual partners that he met involved a man named John Barron, a broker, a publican, a joiner and a weaver. His encounters also involved other artisans "from other classes and petit-bourgeois milieux", including three gentleman's servants and a fustian cutter named Simister who was well known for manipulating young men into homosexual sex.

== 19th century ==
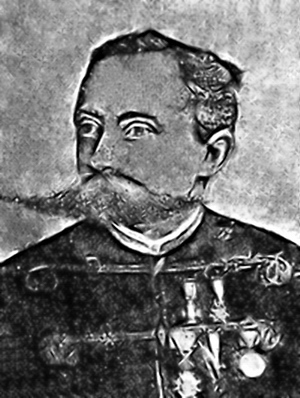
Jack the Ripper suspect Francis Tumblety who had a homosexual relationship in Liverpool

Research by Dr Jeff Evans highlights the extent to which gay men were arrested and persecuted in the court papers of Liverpool between 1850 and the 1970s.

In 1861, Parliament removed the death penalty for the crime of buggery under the Offences Against the Person Act 1861. The punishment was now life imprisonment or a jail sentence of not less than 10 years.

The research by Dr Evans showed that between 1850 and 1918, there were more incidences in Liverpool than anywhere else in the entire county of Lancashire where inter-male sex related cases were being actively pursued by the police and courts. During these years, there were a total of 276 incidences in Lancashire where magistrates insisted on a man accused of a homosexual sex crime should be sent to trial. Only four urban centres in the county recorded these incidences in double figures: 109 occasions were in Liverpool, 35 were in Manchester, 36 in Salford and 11 in St Helens.

Evans compared the high number of cases in Liverpool to the rest of Lancashire, where it was a relatively rare occurrence for police forces to build successful criminal cases against homosexual crimes, or for gay men to be sent to trial. He argues that Liverpool was a notable exception to the rule.

From the 1890s, Evans argues that the police forces in larger conurbations were able to prosecute inter-male sex cases in greater numbers due to the fact they were able to more easily identify areas where it was taking place. From as early as 1806, Liverpool City Police force had identified an established meeting place for homosexual sex at the bottom end of Dale Street in Liverpool City Centre.

It was also during this period it is known that Jack the Ripper suspect Francis Tumblety had a homosexual affair with well-known author Hall Caine whilst spending time in the city. Tumblety is said to have engaged in 'unusual sexual activities' and became known for his 'mania for the company of young men and grown-up youths', and for despising women. In 1888, he was arrested on charges of gross indecency and indecent assault with force and arms against four men in Liverpool, euphemisms for homosexual activities. It would have been later in the same year he was arrested on suspicion of the infamous Whitechapel murders.

During the 1870s, Constantine P. Cavafy lived in Liverpool with his family. Widely considered the most distinguished Greek poet of the 20th century, his homosexual orientation informed much of his work which included sexually explicit erotic poetry.

1895 saw a high-profile case involving three homosexual men in Liverpool which culminated in the hanging of William Miller, a 27-year-old sailor, at Watson Prison. Miller had been lodging with Edward Moyse, a wealthy local bookshop proprietor, and his young apprentice John Needham, who were both homosexuals. Over time Miller had become violently jealous of the pair and proceeded to batter Moyse to death with a fire poker as well as attempting to take Needham's life. Miller had also turned his attentions on finding Moyse's money. After surviving the attack, Needham was able to raise the alarm, inform the police and positively identify Miller, who was later tried and hanged for murder.

== 20th century ==
=== 1910s–1920s ===
According to a thesis by Dr Jeff Evans, in the couple of decades that followed World War I, police managers and their governing bodies in Liverpool were choosing to punish homosexual sex crimes in an even more severe and disproportionate manner than previous years. In the period between 1919 and 1939, Liverpool continued to be the location with the most number of homosexuals being sent to trial compared to anywhere else in Lancashire. Evans notes that Liverpool was flourishing as a large and busy port with a booming commercial sex industry, but argues that this was not necessarily the case why so many gay men were being prosecuted. Evans argues that Liverpool was an exceptional case within Lancashire where a more explicit 'moral agenda' was taking place to stamp out homosexual sex acts. There was also a marked increase in the number of cases where the most serious charge of 'gross indecency' was being pursued.

=== 1930s ===
In his interview with Our Story Liverpool, a local LGBT history project, the late artist Yankel Feather recounts his experiences of cottaging in public toilets off Princes Road in the 1930s. Due to the lack of openly gay clubs and bars at this time, many gay men visited lavatories as a means of meeting others in secret for both sex and company. Yankel explains how life was still very difficult and how men would make the most of whatever pleasures they could get in life. During the Second World War, he goes onto describe how a 'gay identity' had not yet developed and how the word 'queer' was still being used to describe 'difference'.

=== 1940s–1960s ===
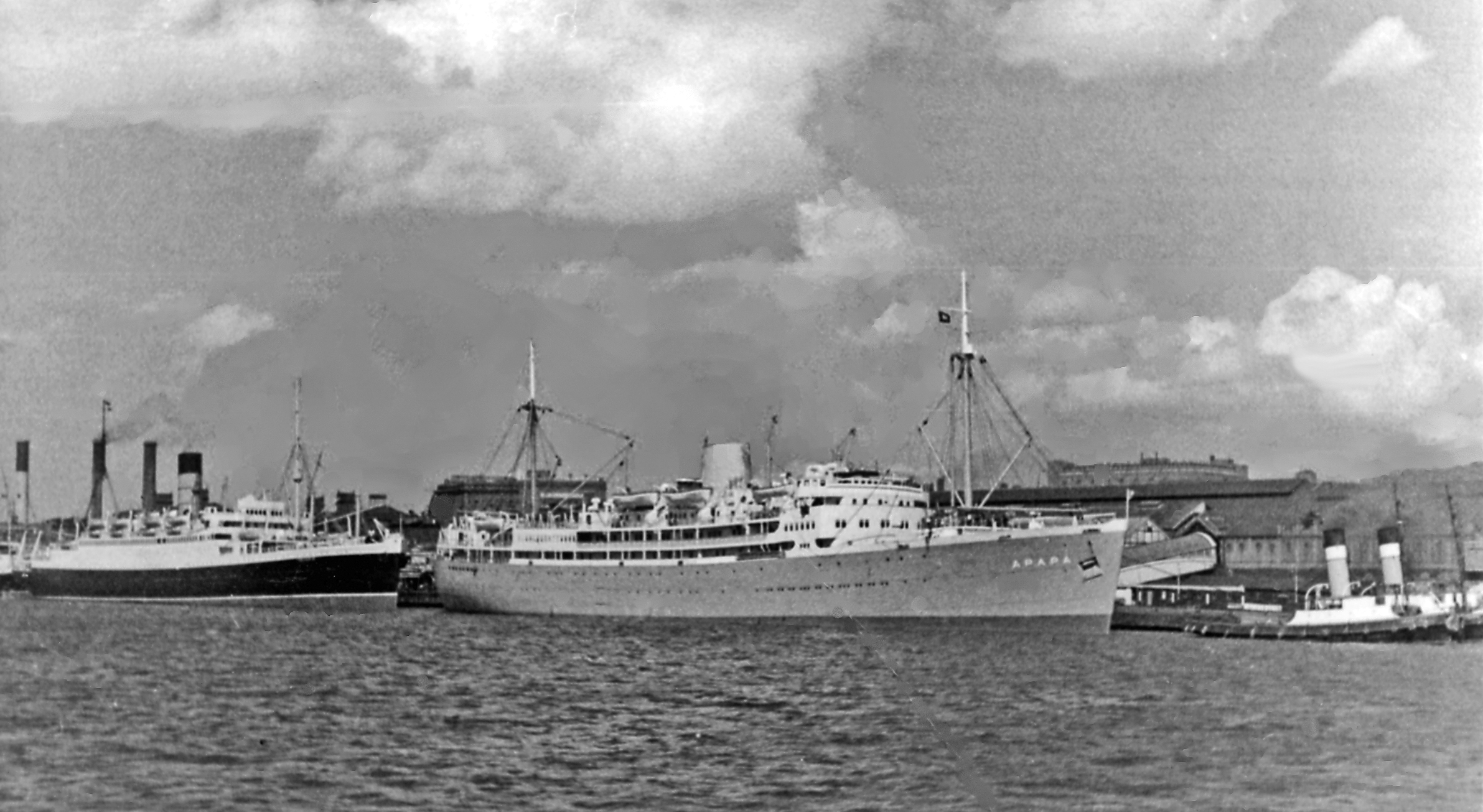
Liverpool's busy port brought a large number of gay stewards, sailors, soldiers and airmen to the city

A number of contributing factors at the advent of World War II meant Liverpool had earned itself a reputation as 'gay centre of The North'. Liverpool's strategic importance as the great port of the British Empire brought with it a constant flow of passenger liners and merchant ships and a regular influx of gay stewards, sailors, soldiers and airmen choosing to spend time and money in the city. The general sense that death could very easily be around the corner and consequential 'live for the moment' ethos led to semi-secret pockets of acceptance and development of a vibrant underground subculture of homosexual bars and cottages. Gays and lesbians found refuge in the pubs around Queen Square close to the city's music clubs and theatres in what had evolved into an unofficial gay village. The area was already familiar to the 'theatrical crowd' and had been associated with 'disreputable activity' since the early 19th century.

Gay frequented bars included the Stork Hotel, Magic Clock, Royal Court bar, Old Royal and the Basnett Bar. Numerous other places such as the Black Cat & Bear's Paw existed further out from the main strip.

The neighbourhood provided asylum well into the 1960s, but people who patronised the bars tended to be confined to those who were aware of the criminality and comfortable enough being out. Sex between men was still a criminal offence and being gay was highly disapproved of socially. Local radio DJ Pete Price recalled how the gay clientele were still forced to exercise caution when frequenting the area as despite being relatively tolerated by local police, considerable adversity would still be felt. As a consequence, the semi-covert community had adopted its own slang terms and language.

The Magic Clock was characterised as 'home away from home' for a lot of gay men, a 'little old fashioned traditional pub with stained glass windows, beaten copper bar top and big brass bar pumps' full of 'Quentin Crisp types', 'camp little queens' in suits and glamorous eyelashes. The barmaid known as 'Babs' was known to be a gay tolerant motherly figure and the straight clientele were very aware of the type of place it was, very often the only place gay people could mix with others who were like them. Regulars recall how pubs in those days closed at 10pm and when the alcohol had finished many would continue onwards to house parties.

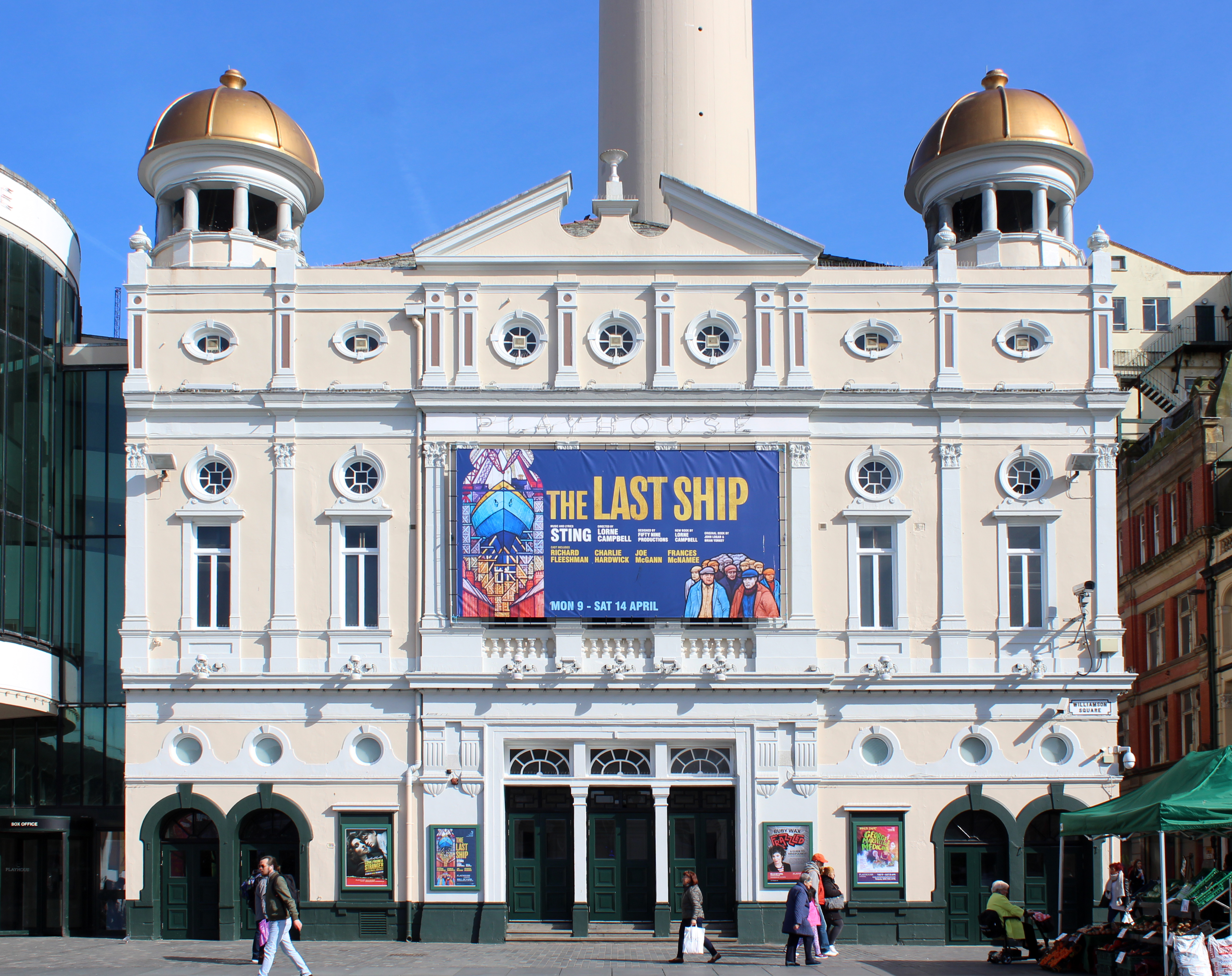
Liverpool Playhouse Theatre on Williamson Square (adjacent to Queen Square) was at the centre of a gay neighbourhood from the 1940s

Cinemas also provided an alternative place where gay men could meet. The Liverpool News Theatre on Clayton Square and Tatler News Theatre on Church Street were known in gay circles as a meeting place for sex. Closer to the bars, the Playhouse Theatre also had a strong gay element and the gay community would often mix with members of the cast.

The cottaging culture was still very much prominent, with several public toilets identified as hotspots for homosexual activity. Public conveniences dotted around Liverpool City Centre had earned themselves nicknames, the 'Wheel of Fortune' and the 'Garden of Allah' amongst some of the titles. Married men would visit regularly after work, recommend busy areas to other men and found themselves dodging undercover police officers who set out to entrap those participating in sexual acts, many were caught and arrested. In the early fifties, the Army and Navy store on Byrom Street employed a lot of men who had served time in prison for these crimes. With their reputations damaged, many had been unable to find work elsewhere. Few places for lesbians existed by the early sixties and they were to a larger extent less obvious in public. Lesbians and gay men had their own separate networks and often did not socialise together with women preferring to meet up in houses.

Shortly after the Wolfenden report of 1957 and the beginnings of the Gay liberation movement, articles about homosexuality began to appear in the Liverpool University Guild Gazette. The language and tone was still largely negative with terminology such as 'queer', 'sodomite', 'perversion' and 'illness' still in use in reference to homosexuality.

=== 1970s ===
The 60s saw the Campaign for Homosexual Equality formed and by the early 70s the Liverpool branch had formed their own gay society at Liverpool University. The society championed gay rights, organised events, meetings, and published pieces in the university's newspaper to challenge stereotypes and myths about gay people. At national conferences and protests, the society helped to influence the national student debate surrounding sexuality.

By 1975, most of the bars that had provided a safe haven for so long around Queen Square had been demolished to make way for the new St. John's Shopping Centre, Roe Street Gyratory and bus station. The Bar Royal on Wood Street had become the 'place to be'. Guests there were heavily vetted on arrival by its owner Sadie and the main door was bolted as people entered. The bar became a hive of activity where students mixed with dockers and glamorous transvestites and transsexuals mixed harmoniously with lesbians and gay men. By the close of the decade, the various groups had separated as heterosexual 'New Romantics' had begun to take over. After a brief close, re-opening and boycott due to rampant misogyny, the bar finally closed when Sadie died in the late 1980s.

=== 1980s ===
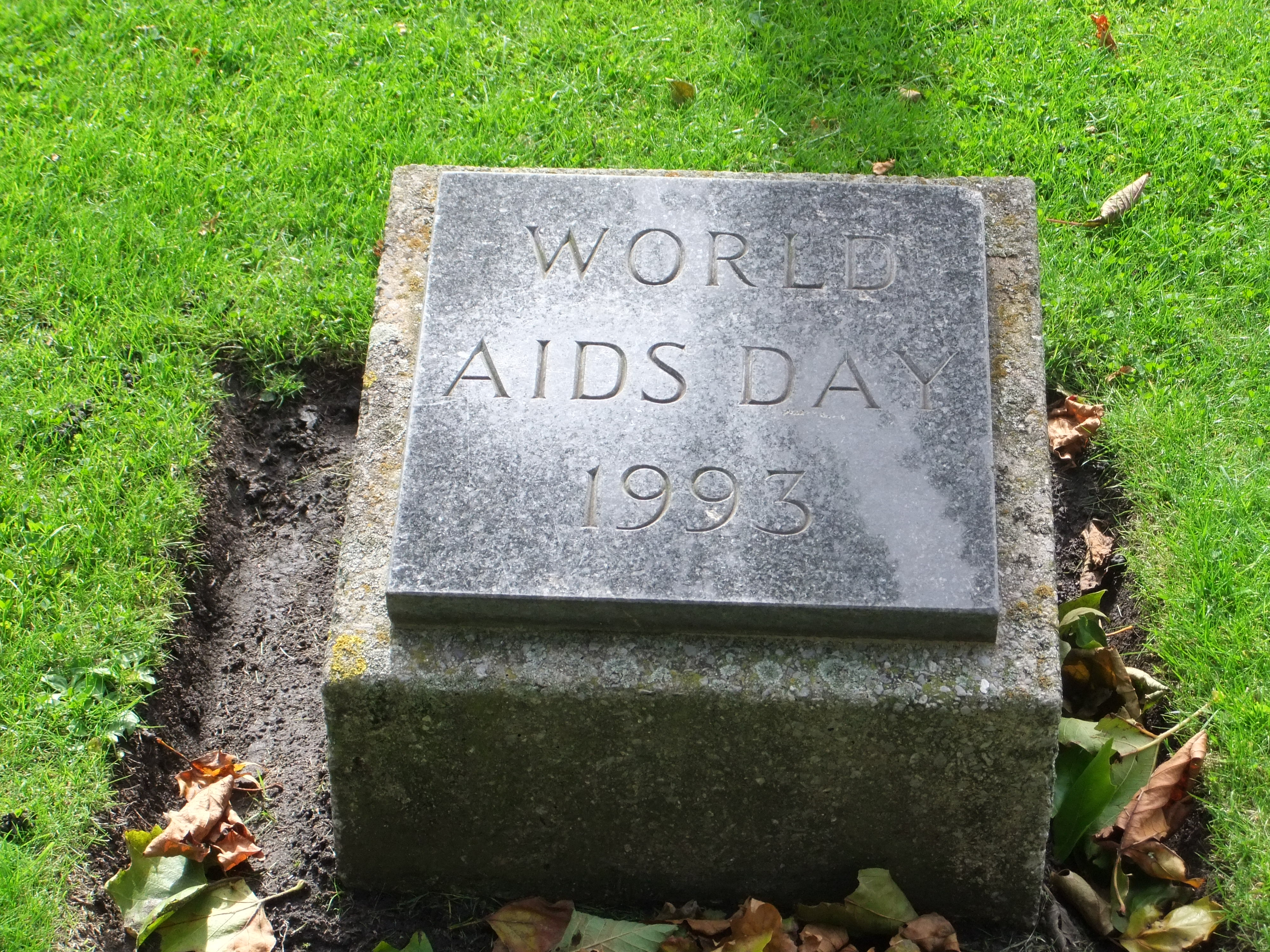
World AIDS Day plaque at St John's Gardens, Liverpool to remember those who have died in the epidemic

Interviewees from Our Story Liverpool recall memories of the vibrant 1980's gay scene which included Jody's, The Curzon, Lisbon, Paco's, Reflections, Scarlett's and Sadie's. Most of the venues were based on or around Stanley Street, tracing the embryonic stages of the present day gay quarter. Scarlett's and Reflections both served as a meeting place for members of Friend Merseyside, a Liverpool-based LGBT support group which operated a weekly coffee bar, befriending, counselling and switchboard service in the city centre. In spite of the modest freedoms afforded by the bars, interviews reveal how homosexuality was still seen as taboo in mainstream society and how copies of the Gay Times were still being stocked in brown paper bags at the News From Nowhere bookstore, even by the late 1980s.

Interviews in the Liverpool Echo describe how the 1980's AIDS epidemic impacted Liverpool's predominantly underground and tight-knit gay scene. Due to misconceptions about HIV and AIDS that existed at the time and the stigma towards the gay community, many people started to withdraw from social contact. As a result of lost interaction and gatherings, a dramatic drop in the number of people frequenting the gay bars and clubs plus a large number of local gay men dying from the disease, interviewees describe how the 'scene went quiet'. It was not until the late 1980s with the arrival of medication to treat HIV and AIDS such as AZT that the social scene started to recover and ultimately evolve to become more mainstream with the greater incorporation of heterosexual people.

Due to the hysteria over the AIDS epidemic as well as anxieties surrounding the infamous Section 28, which prohibited local authorities from intentionally 'promoting homosexuality', Liverpool City Council chose to cancel a grant to a gay play being performed at the Everyman Theatre in 1988. Following widespread opposition to Section 28, a co-ordinated 'Liverpool Against the Clause' campaign organised protests in nearby Manchester, whilst debates were had on the extent to which one was liable to be prosecuted for working in schools. In an effort to stimulate debate and in a show of solidarity, Tate Liverpool opened David Hockney's exhibition illustrating C.P. Cavafy's explicitly homosexual poems in 1993."Link" (PDF).

=== 1990s ===
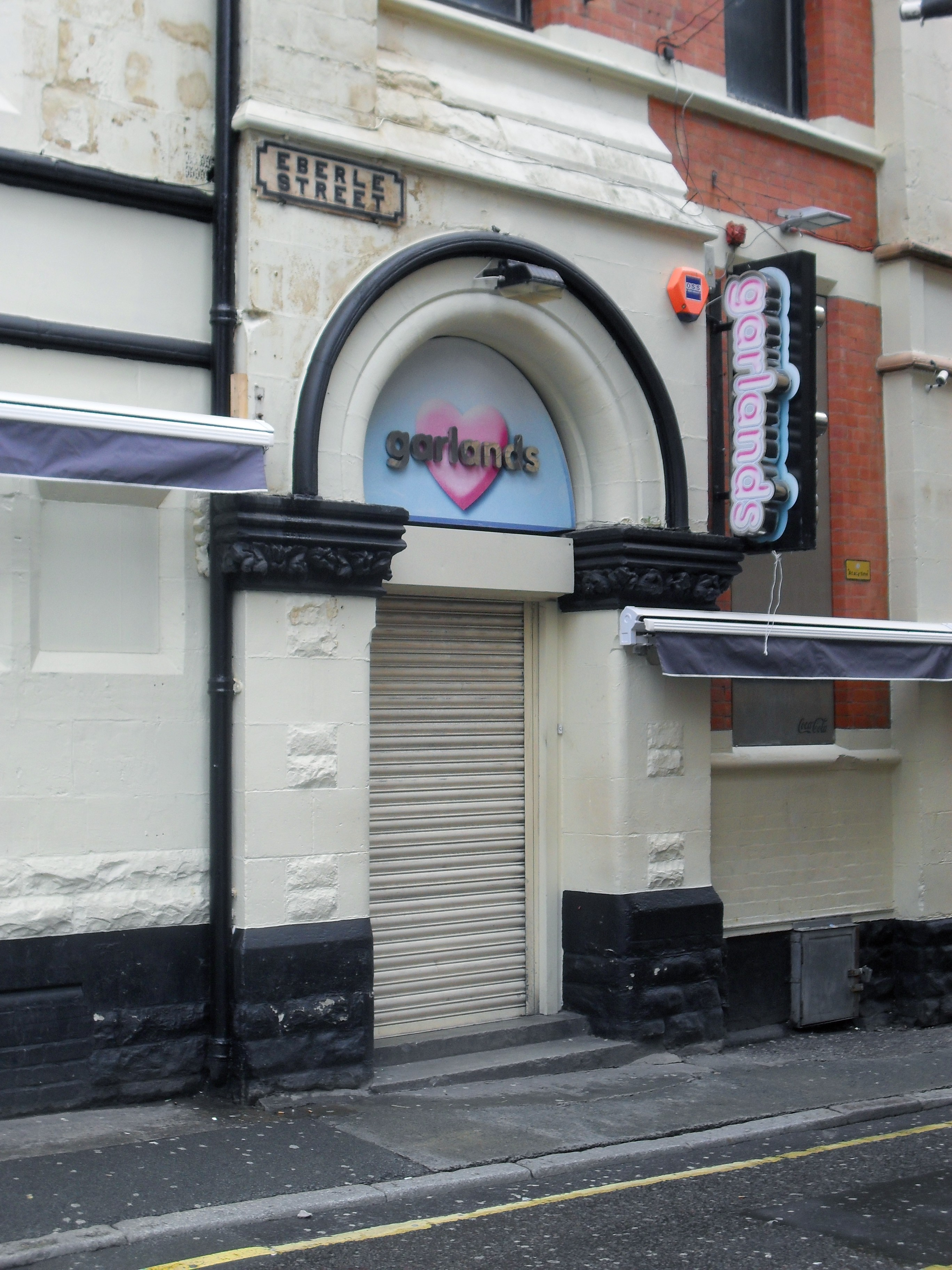
Garlands nightclub which ran in Liverpool's Gay Quarter from 1993 to 2017

Stuart Linden Rhodes, former photographer for Gay Times & APN Northern UK gay scene in the 1990s, published a photo-book in 2022 titled 'Out and About with Linden'. The book was created from a collection of negatives accumulated over a 30-year period and is a documentation of the LGBT venues in the big cities of Northern England throughout the 1990s.

Stuart Linden Rhodes told the Liverpool Echo that by 1992 there were six LGBT venues in Liverpool City Centre, most of which were based in and around Stanley Street. The venues were Reflections, The Curzon Club, The Lisbon, Sadie's Bar Royal, Paco's Bar and Jody's. In the 1990s, he describes a significant transformation within Liverpool's gay nightlife scene, in which the venues were becoming more socially mixed, mainstream and were competing on a scale of national importance. Large breweries had also began to invest and sponsor gay venues and events. He describes the evolution between 1992 and 1997 from a one time scene dominated by small traditional bars and nightclubs to the superclubs of the late 1990s, such as Garlands. This coincided with the fact that LGBT people had begun to celebrate their identity in a more public and visible way.

Pulse Magazine describes a vibrant, expanding gay scene based around Stanley Street during 1994–1995. In the Pulse Magazine 1994 awards, the 'Best New Gay Village' in the United Kingdom joint award went to Liverpool and Edinburgh. The 'Best Real Ale Pub' award went to Time Out bar in Liverpool. The magazine lists The Curzon Club, Garlands, Reflections, Paco's, The Lisbon, Brunswick Vaults and Daley's Dandelion as venues based in the emergent gay neighbourhood.

In June 1994, Garlands is described as a cross between a trendy cafe bar and disco attracting many young people for its high energy dance music policy. The large and spacious cafe bar opened from midday and offered food, drink and satellite TV. Reflections was described as down to earth, dark and seedy which had numerous bars including a quieter one.

In late 1994, Time Out bar opened on Pownall Square which became popular with the 18 to 25 age group, particularly students. It was described as a laid back 'Berlinesque' bar with polished pine floors and was tightly crammed with people.

In the following month, the Escape Club, a 'lavishly decorated' two level venue with balconies, two bars, two dance floors and a capacity of four hundred opened on the other side of the city centre. The total cost of the venue was £1.25million. Baa Bar was also entertaining gay punters on the opposite side of the city centre.

In March 1995, Pulse argues that the most notable gay clubs on Liverpool's gay scene were The Escape and Garlands. Daley's Dandelion opened in June 1995. Throughout the rest of the year, plans were being formalised and fundraisers organised for the Mersey Pride which took place on Pownall Square outside Time Out. The Pink Palace also opened temporarily next to the Masquerade Bar on Cumberland Street in September 1995.

In the 1990s, a series of gay prides were held in Liverpool City Centre (see Liverpool Pride).

== 21st century ==
=== Early 2000s ===
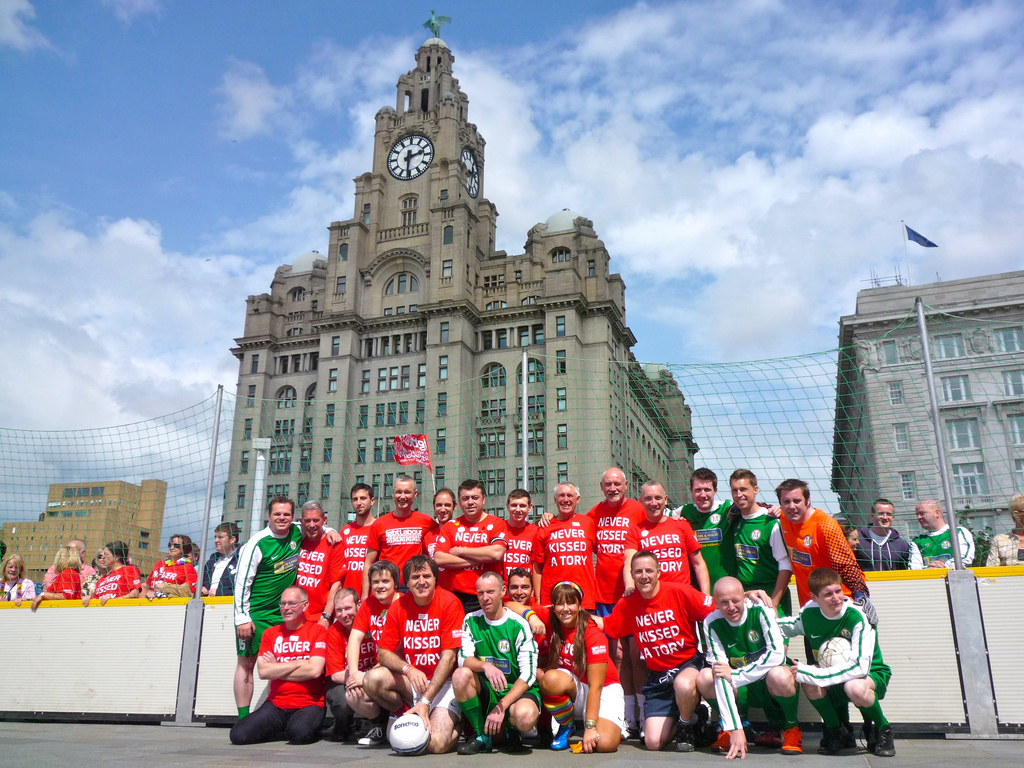
Mersey Marauders FC facing Liverpool City Councillors for the Armistead Cup at Liverpool Pride 2011

In the 2000s, Liverpool's gay community had become increasingly visible and there was a concerted push to take it further. However, comparisons were still being drawn with the gay profile of its closest neighbour Manchester, which along with its successful gay village and Mardi Gras, had for a long time claimed to be 'Gay Capital of the North'.

Liverpool was often accused of lagging behind and not providing adequate provisions for its diverse communities. It had been a decade since the city had held a Pride of its own. Whilst the LGBT community had established roots around Stanley Street and surrounding district for several decades, a debate on developing and promoting it as a 'gay village', akin to other major cities, was only just beginning to gather momentum.

2004 saw the launch of Homotopia and the first Liverpool Lesbian and Gay Film Festival (Outsiders) which together boasted an ambitious programme of LGBT culture across the city. Homotopia's Festival Director, Gary Everett, said "The City is experiencing one of the most exciting chapters in its history, and I hope that this event will unleash the creative energies."

Mersey Marauders, Liverpool's own gay football team was launched later in 2005, whilst city leaders continued debating the Liverpool gay village. The pro side hoped to boost the local economy whilst those with reservations pointed to the fact that a gay district was already growing organically and warned about further ghettoising the community. Prior to the introduction of legalised same sex relationships, Liverpool was one of the first local authorities to grant commitment ceremonies for gay couples at its municipal Register office. Despite not granting legal rights at the time, in 2005, the city became the first ever UK local authority to include a gay couple on the front cover of its civil ceremony promotional material.

A report in 2006 into the experience of LGBTQ+ people living, working, studying and socialising in Liverpool found that of the 210 that took part in the survey 59% had experienced homophobic crime within the Liverpool area. This was significantly higher than in London which reported a hate incidence rate of 47%.

=== 2008 European Capital of Culture ===
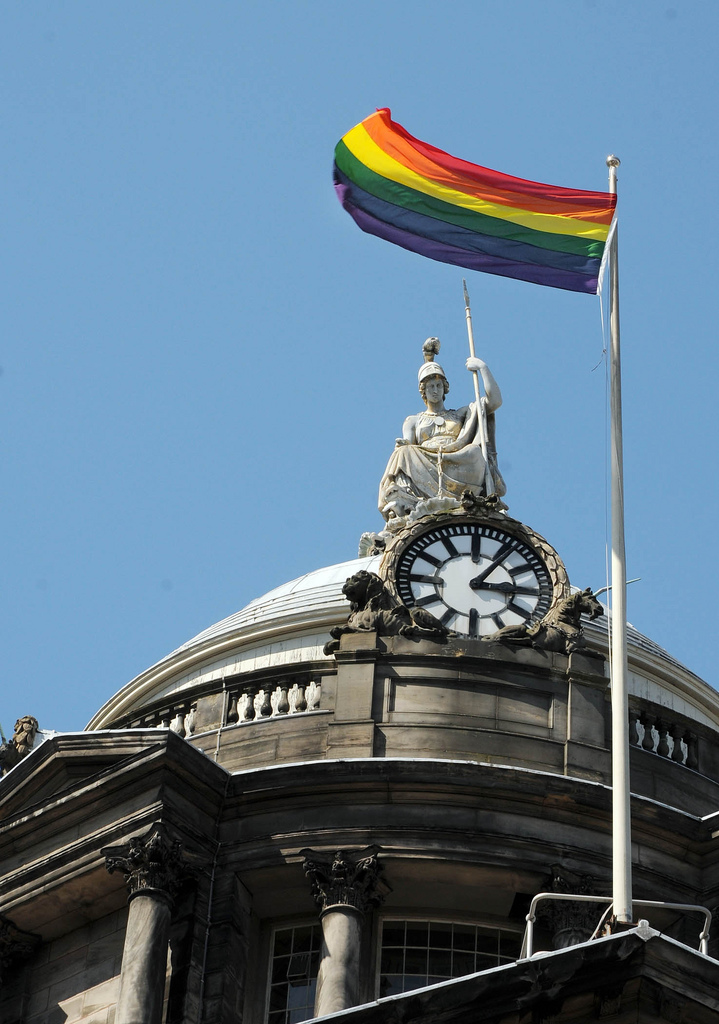
Rainbow flag over Liverpool Town Hall on International Day Against Homophobia & Transphobia 2009.

In 2008, Liverpool held the yearlong title as European Capital of Culture and with the cultural credentials of the city under the spotlight, the LGBT community had begun to question its place in the overall context. Liverpool had successfully celebrated Homotopia and Outsiders for several years, but questions were still being raised as to how 'gay friendly' the area was and why the city was still the largest in Britain to not hold a Pride.

The complexities associated with Liverpool were under scrutiny and reasons as to why the city had not moved forward were explored. Theories included that the city was 'old fashioned, shackled by nostalgia, rough, macho, and submerged by Roman Catholicism'.

Later that year, Liverpool's LGBT Network was established and brought together local individuals and organisations. The venture intended the gay community to be more visible, inclusive and gain a greater role in local decisions. Its key campaigns were to develop Liverpool Pride as well as tackling homophobia in the region.

=== 2008–2009 Michael Causer and James Parkes attacks ===
In the same year Liverpool celebrated Capital of Culture, the homophobic murder of 18-year-old Michael Causer brought national attention to the city. Shocked and outraged by the acquittal of Gavin Alker, who was said to have played a critical role in the murder, the LGBT community organised a protest outside Liverpool Crown Court. Headed by the Causer family, protestors reacted angrily amid the backdrop of placards, remembrance photos, and rainbow flags.

The following year in 2009, the community was again plunged into exasperation after gay trainee police officer James Parkes was left fighting for his life after an attack by 20 teenage youths in the heart of the gay quarter. A candlelit vigil attended by 2500 people was held on Stanley Street with James' boyfriend, local community leaders, and Louise Ellman MP as speakers.

The wider implications of these high-profile attacks have since been felt, not least through helping to galvanise the community by bringing together various disparate groups and organisations, but also causing a shift in attitude at municipal authority level. Merseyside Police have since been voted amongst the top 3 most gay friendly police forces in the UK by Stonewall, and in 2012 the city gained international recognition by becoming the world's first to mark IDAHO with a programme of free events. Moreover, the city now marks IDAHO every year by flying the rainbow flag from prominent buildings in the city centre.

=== Early 2010s ===
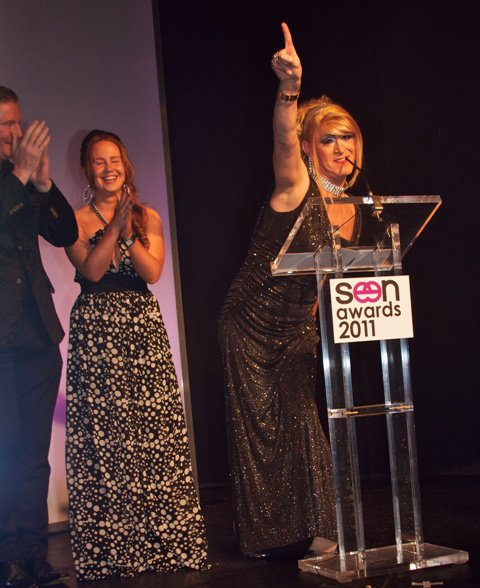
Aunty Marlene wins "Drag Queen of the year" at Liverpool Seen Awards, 2011

The 2010s saw enormous strides in raising the profile of Liverpool's LGBT community. The second official Liverpool Pride in 2011 was attended by over 40,000 people and firmly established it as one of Europe's largest free Gay Pride festivals, generating over £2.6 million for the local economy. Moreover, Liverpool City Council made the decision to officially recognise the Stanley Street district as Liverpool's official gay quarter and signposted the area with street signs emblazoned with the rainbow flag, making it the first UK city to mark a gay quarter in this way. The City Council hoped to make the area an international tourist attraction and had planned extensive regeneration and investment over the following years.

The city was the location for a pivotal moment in the history of the gay rights movement as the Liberal Democrats announced their public support for same sex marriage at their 2010 annual conference held in Liverpool, becoming the first mainstream British political party to do so.

An exhibition called "Hello, Sailor!" was on display at various museums throughout Liverpool for over 12 years between 2006 and 2019. The exhibition, in conjunction with Homotopia and National Museums Liverpool, looked at the experience of gay seafarers on passenger and merchant Ships from the 1950s – 1980s. Through video, photos and personal stories, visitors were able to gain an insight into the hidden history of gay life at sea. The exhibition was one of the few examples where this history had ever been celebrated in a major British museum.

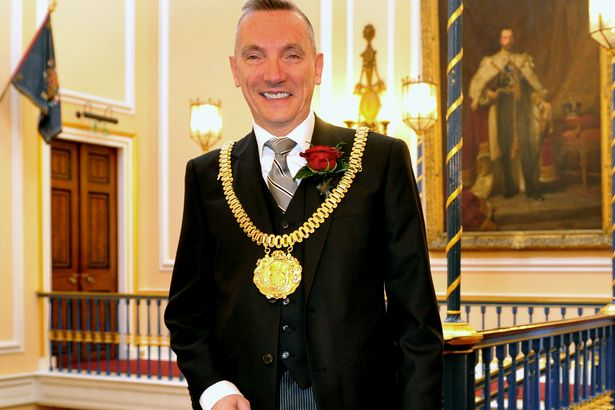
2013: Openly gay Lord Mayor of Liverpool, Cllr Gary Millar, becomes the first British Lord Mayor in a civil partnership

The first ever award ceremony to celebrate the achievements of Liverpool's LGBT community took place on 13 October 2011, organised by Seen Magazine - the city's home grown lesbian and gay publication. Amongst the winners was the Michael Causer Foundation, voted as Best LGBT Charity of the Year.

In the early part of the decade, Liverpool also competed regularly against other UK cities in the annual Mr Gay UK beauty competition, with the representative from the city participating in the national final. The winner of Mr Gay Europe 2007, Jackson Netto, was a student at Liverpool University, however, he represented Germany and not the UK.

=== 2017–2018 hate crimes ===
In 2018, homophobic and transphobic hate crime was at record levels in Merseyside, dramatically increasing since Michael Causer's death in 2008. Of the figures retrieved by the BBC, more than half of the 442 reported victims in 2017 were under-35, and more than 50 were under 18. There were a number of theories and factors suggested as contributing to this rise, one of which was improvements in reporting. It was suggested that LGBTQ+ people generally felt more comfortable reporting hate crimes and that police were taking them more seriously. However, the number of offenders being brought to justice had not been found to have increased in line with the number of hate crimes recorded. It was reported that only one in five homophobic hate crimes were solved. "Merseyside Police told BBC Three there has been a 38% rise in trans hate crime since [2017], with most victims aged between 26–35".

In December 2018, according to Freedom of Information responses received from 38 police forces across England, Scotland and Wales, Merseyside had the highest rate of recorded homophobic hate crimes.

=== 2020s ===
On 22 June 2021, hundreds of people demonstrated in Liverpool City Centre after reports of at least four people being attacked in suspected homophobic hate crimes in the city within the space of a single month.

A young woman, her girlfriend and sister were attacked and threatened with rape and murder at the end of May. A gay couple and their friend were attacked at knifepoint on 11 June. In addition, two 19-year-old bisexual friends, Curtis Stewart and Josh Ormrod, were battered in separate assaults only days apart during the following week.

The protest, organised by bar staff from Liverpool's LGBT venues, started at the corner of Church Street and Paradise Street at 1pm and consisted of a march past St Johns Shopping Centre, Williamson Square and finished at Victoria Street in the gay quarter. Speeches and statements in condemnation of the attacks were made by Liverpool Mayor Joanne Anderson, Metro Mayor of the Liverpool City Region Steve Rotheram, Merseyside Police and Crime Commissioner Emily Spurrell and Andi Herring of Liverpool City Region Pride Foundation.

Merseyside Police confirmed that patrols would increase in and around the city's Pride Quarter and would include "high visibility" and plain clothes officers.

=== 2020 COVID-19 pandemic and Linda Gold's Funny Boyz ===
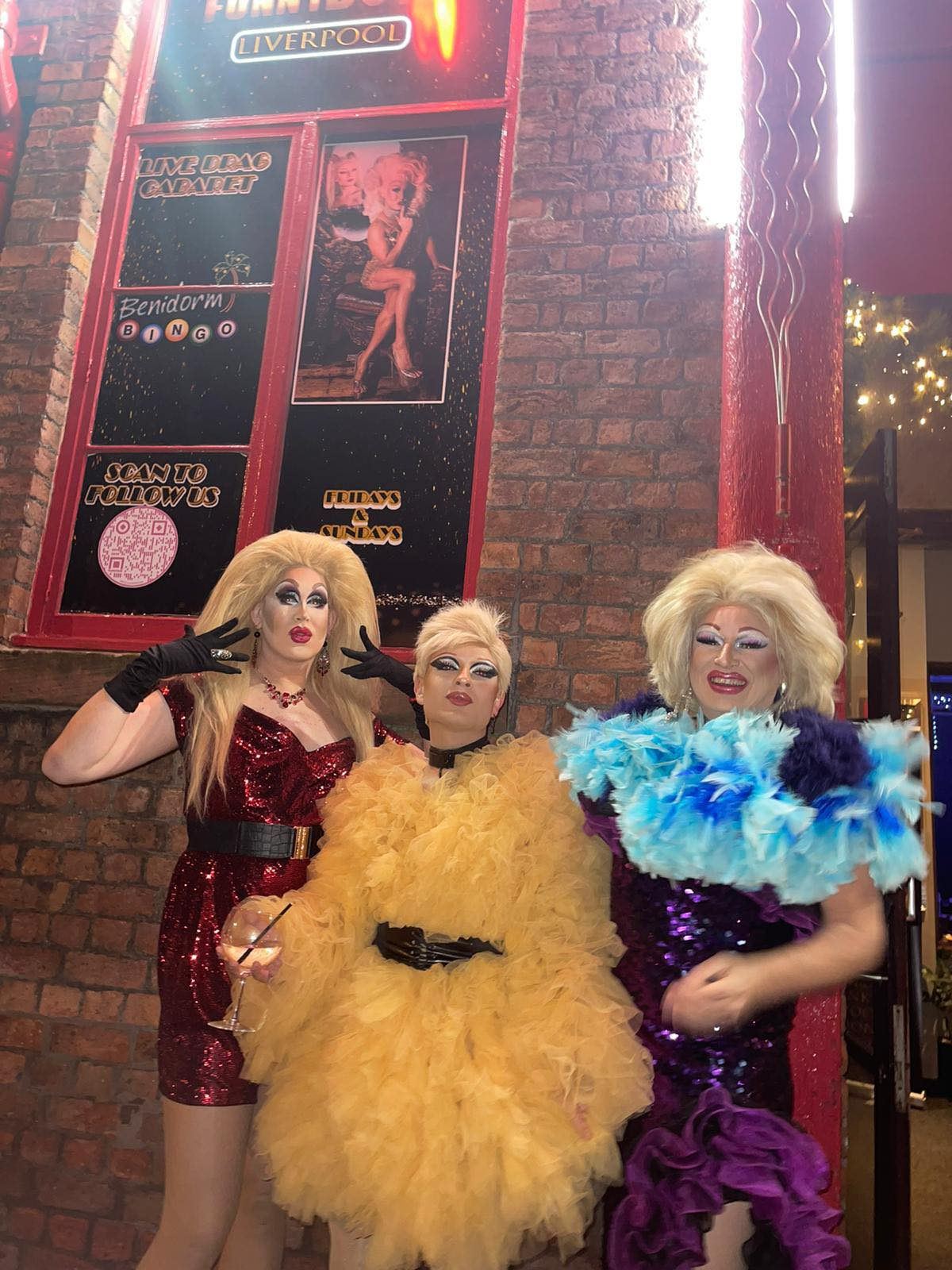
Linda Gold's Funny Boyz at Blundell Street, Liverpool

In February 2021, a number of prominent members from Liverpool's LGBT community spoke to the Liverpool Echo to describe how the series of recent lockdowns surrounding the COVID-19 pandemic had devastated the local LGBT community. In particular, the measures had led to a feeling of isolation amongst the city's drag queen circuit through them not being able to perform to live audiences, earn their living and to self express. Much of the drag queen community had also suffered a deterioration in their mental health.

Between March 2020 and the time the Liverpool Echo article had been published, the UK had been through a sequence of restrictive controls to stem the spread of Coronavirus which had directly affected the hospitality industry. The measures included three full national lockdowns to bars and clubs, a local lockdown which applied specifically to the Liverpool City Region, 10pm curfews in the hospitality sector, the 'rule of six' on indoor and outdoor social gatherings, and a rule whereby patrons to bars and clubs could only drink alcohol in a venue when it was accompanied by a 'substantial meal'.

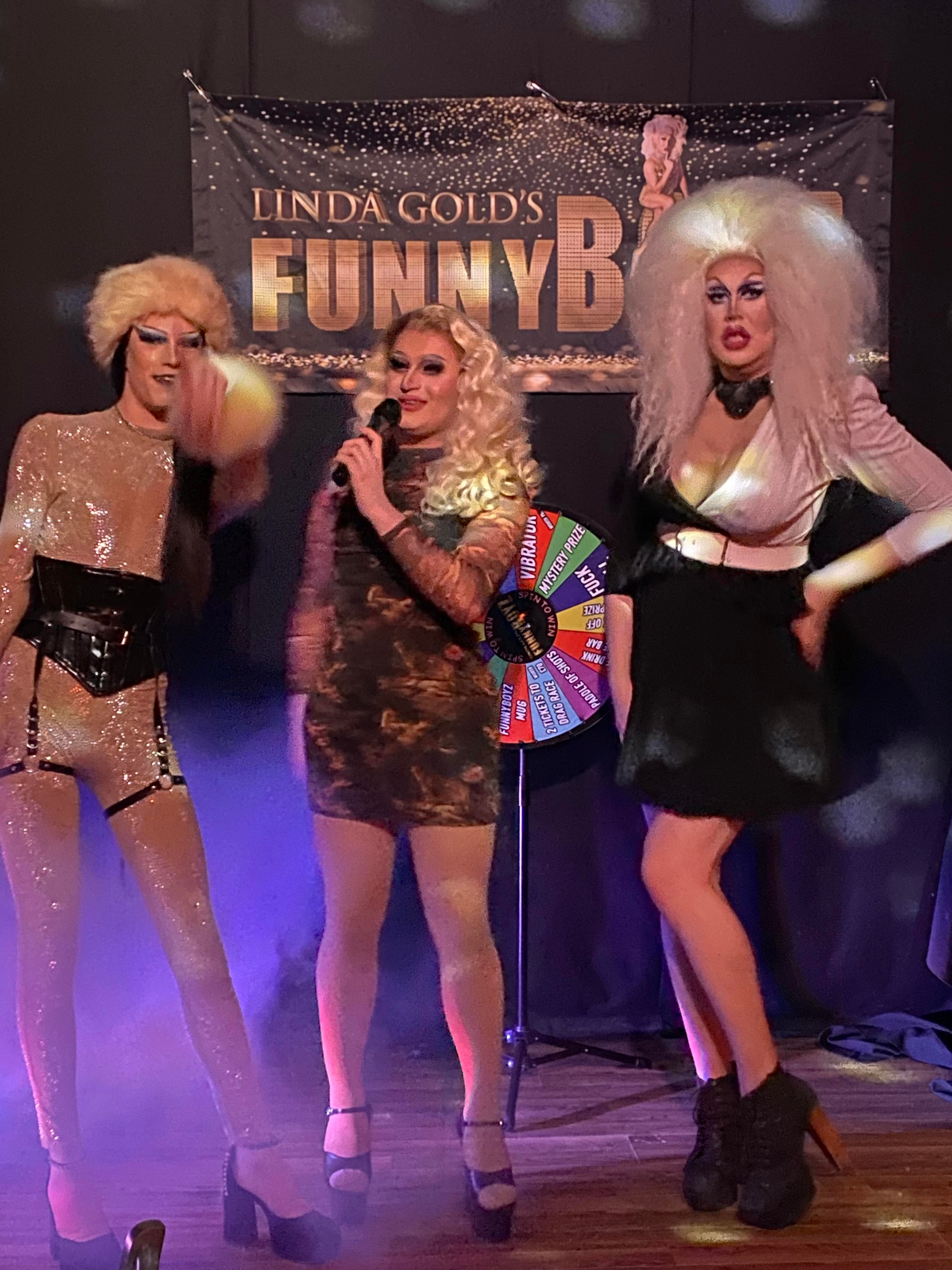
Linda Gold's Funny Boyz at Blundell Street, Liverpool

Linda Gold, a Liverpool born drag queen, who had been entertaining crowds for over two decades, told the Liverpool Echo that the feeling amongst drag queens was that they had been 'cast aside'. Whilst suffering a loss to their income, many were also unable to use the Government's furlough scheme on account of being self-employed entertainers. Linda Gold said this had come at a time when Rupaul's Drag Race was gaining popularity which had led to new interest in drag performance in the public eye.

During the 2020 lockdowns, Linda Gold had entered into a partnership with a collective of five licensed venues across the UK to launch a new event called 'Funny Boyz'. Linda told the Liverpool Echo that due to severe losses to income, she had spent close to £100,000 worth of savings with no return.

Towards the end of 2020, Linda had attempted to establish Funny Boyz club on Liverpool's Stanley Street with a large planned event but was forced to cancel at the last minute following the Government's announcement of the second national lockdown.

As a direct response to the government restrictions, many Liverpool drag queens had started to showcase their performances online which often included live shows on social media. Linda Gold began an online show called EuroDrag TV, a spin off of her EuroDrag brand which had run since 2015 and was described as 'Europe's largest drag competition'. The new online show consisted of comedy sketches, interviews with celebrities, drag queens, games and bingo.

In December 2020, Linda Gold reattempted to relaunch the Funny Boyz club in Liverpool during a brief window where the UK government allowed venues in Tier 2 regions to open for business. Linda told Gay London Life that the events were heavily supported, complied with government guidelines and were intended to spread "colour to the world at a time when everybody was desperate to escape months of lockdowns and restrictions". The venture sparked a backlash amongst drag peers who accused her of 'spreading COVID' during sensitive moments of the pandemic and they were forced to close shortly after. The events were successfully relaunched on 17 May 2021 in Liverpool and in numerous cities across the UK including Brighton, London, Manchester and Blackpool.

As of January 2022, Funny Boyz events have also been held in Aberdeen, Glasgow, Norway, Finland, Sweden, Denmark, Italy, Spain and The Netherlands.

=== 2023 Eurovision Song Contest ===
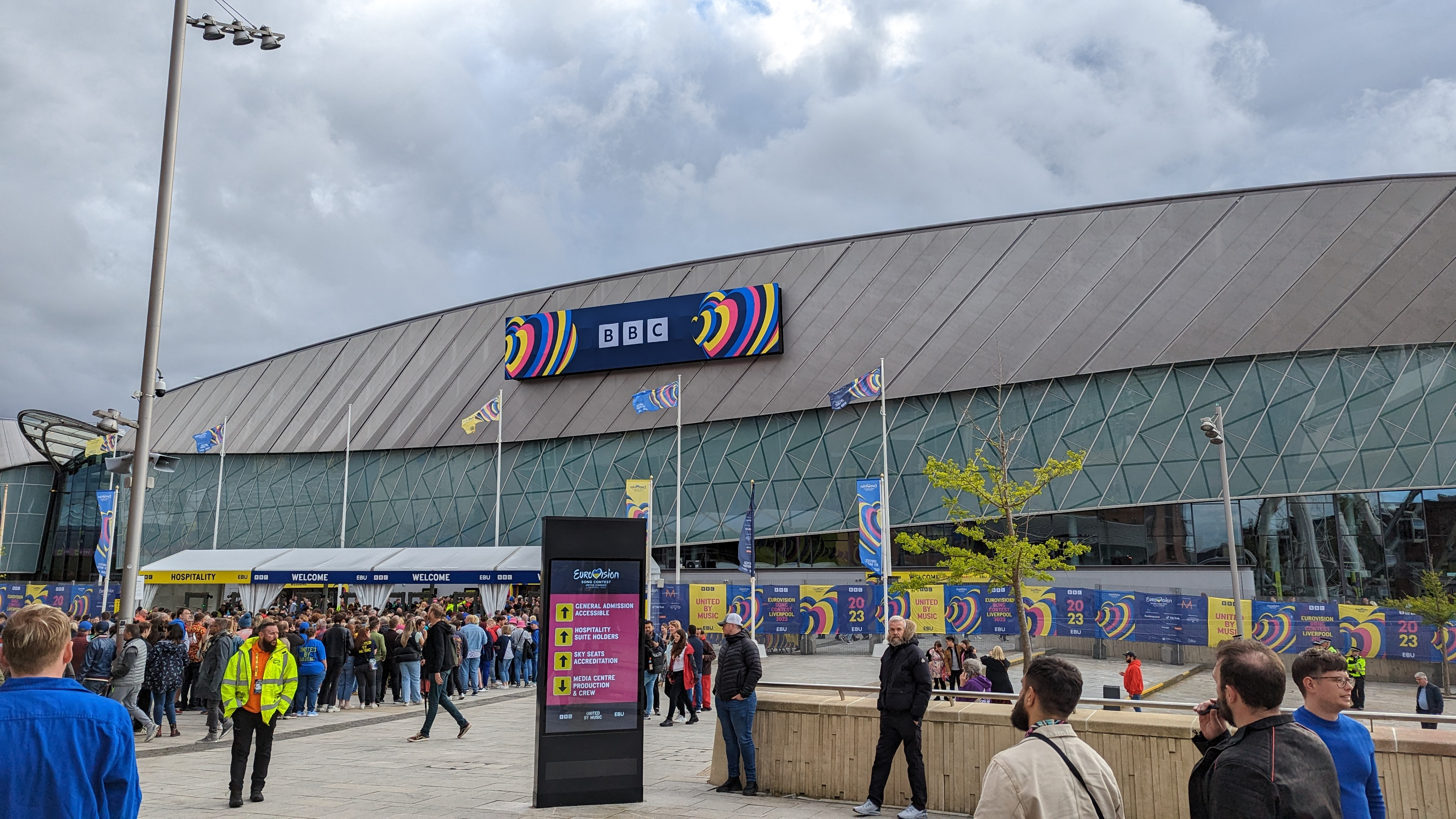
Liverpool Arena dressed with Eurovision Song Contest 2023 branding and security area

Liverpool hosted the Eurovision Song Contest 2023 on behalf of 2022 winner Ukraine. Ukraine was unable to host the contest due to the escalation of the Russo-Ukrainian War and 2022 Russian invasion. Data obtained by Merseyside Police and the Liverpool BID Company suggested that up to an additional 500,000 visitors came to Liverpool over the two weeks leading up to the event.

The Eurovision Song Contest has long appealed to a mass international LGBT audience due to a combination of elements within the show including glamour, camp and flamboyant themes and a consistent history of LGBT representation within the performances themselves.

Gay Times and PinkNews reported a significant increase in LGBT tourists visiting Liverpool for the contest, particularly to the bars and clubs in the city's Pride Quarter. The Pride Quarter had embraced the festival with a schedule of Eurovision themed events which included extended opening hours, outside bars and seating, big screens and bunting featuring union jacks, Ukraine flags and rainbow flags.

A series of events specifically for the LGBT community were also held across the city to coincide with the contest including 'Queer Joy' at the Royal Albert Dock in collaboration with Skittles, Gay Times, Getty Images and Queer Britain, as well as Queerovision, an LGBT wrestling show and an LGBT festival featuring drag, performance, choreography, vogue, music, carnival and circus.

== Homotopia festival ==
Liverpool is the host city of Homotopia: The only lesbian, gay, bisexual and trans combined arts organisation in the North of England. Homotopia is a month-long festival of gay culture including theatre, film, photography and art, as well as delivering a national and international programme of social justice and education initiatives all year round. In the 2008 festival, attendance figures reached 12,000, and by 2011 its web-based TV service reached 200,000 people a year.

Homotopia has been attended by numerous high-profile figures from international gay society, including Peter Tatchell, Holly Johnson, Armistead Maupin, and Amy Lame. In its formative years, Homotopia also represented the gay community with its own float in Liverpool's annual Lord Mayor's Parade, along with other communities in the city.

== Population ==
=== By sexual orientation ===
In the UK Census 2021, for the first time ever people were asked "Which of the following best describes your sexual orientation?" The question was voluntary and was only asked of people aged 16 years and over.

In the Liverpool City Region as a whole, 123,367 Census respondents described their sexual orientation as gay or lesbian, bisexual, pansexual, asexual, queer, other or did not specify an answer. The remaining (majority) of respondents described themselves as straight or heterosexual. The Census gave respondents the option of choosing from: straight or heterosexual, gay or lesbian, bisexual or other sexual orientation. If respondents selected "Other sexual orientation", they were asked to specify the sexual orientation with which they identified. The most common responses of "other sexual orientation" included: pansexual, asexual or queer. These numbers are specified below. All other different answers given are listed as "All other sexual orientations".

The Office for National Statistics confirms that the numbers only convey how people responded to the question, and should not be interpreted as a definitive explanation of whom they are attracted to or their actual relationships.

The table below shows how residents answered in each of the six local authority districts of Liverpool City Region.

Local authority	Number of persons (aged 16 years and over) by sexual orientation in the local authorities of Liverpool City Region (Census 2021)							
Local authority	Straight or Heterosexual	Gay or Lesbian	Bisexual	Pansexual	Asexual	Queer	All other sexual orientations	Not answered
Halton	95,532	1,555	976	162	32	4	7	5,676
Knowsley	114,338	1,803	889	137	27	13	10	7,082
Liverpool (City)	354,781	8,587	7,511	1,173	266	192	74	30,444
Sefton	212,421	3,301	2,024	348	98	25	22	14,151
St Helens	138,290	2,407	1,335	227	71	7	18	8,217
Wirral	237,613	4,179	2,727	406	148	49	29	16,958
Total (Liverpool City Region):	1,152,975	21,832	15,462	2453	642	290	160	82,528

=== By gender identity ===
In the UK Census 2021, for the first time ever people were asked "Is the gender you identify with the same as your sex registered at birth?" The question was voluntary and was only asked of people aged 16 years and over. Respondents could select either "yes" or "no" to the question and then write in their gender identity if they chose to. When respondents answered that their gender identity was different from their sex registered at birth, within this group some then chose not to specify a different gender. The remainder identified as a trans man, trans woman, non-binary or wrote in a different gender identity.

The table below shows how residents answered in each of the six local authority districts of Liverpool City Region.

Local authority	Number of persons (aged 16 years and over) by gender identity in the local authorities of Liverpool City Region (Census 2021)						
Local authority	Gender identity the same as sex registered at birth	Gender identity different from sex registered at birth but no specific identity given	Trans woman	Trans man	Non-binary	All other gender identities	Not answered
Halton	99,109	194	65	83	32	28	4,437
Knowsley	118,217	202	64	86	25	17	5,688
Liverpool (City)	375,804	1,332	461	463	355	160	24,451
Sefton	221,174	340	157	162	85	50	10,422
St Helens	143,771	256	92	122	40	33	6,256
Wirral	248,682	353	209	183	124	86	12,474
Total (Liverpool City Region):	1,206,757	2,677	1,048	1,099	661	374	63,728

== Liverpool transgender community ==
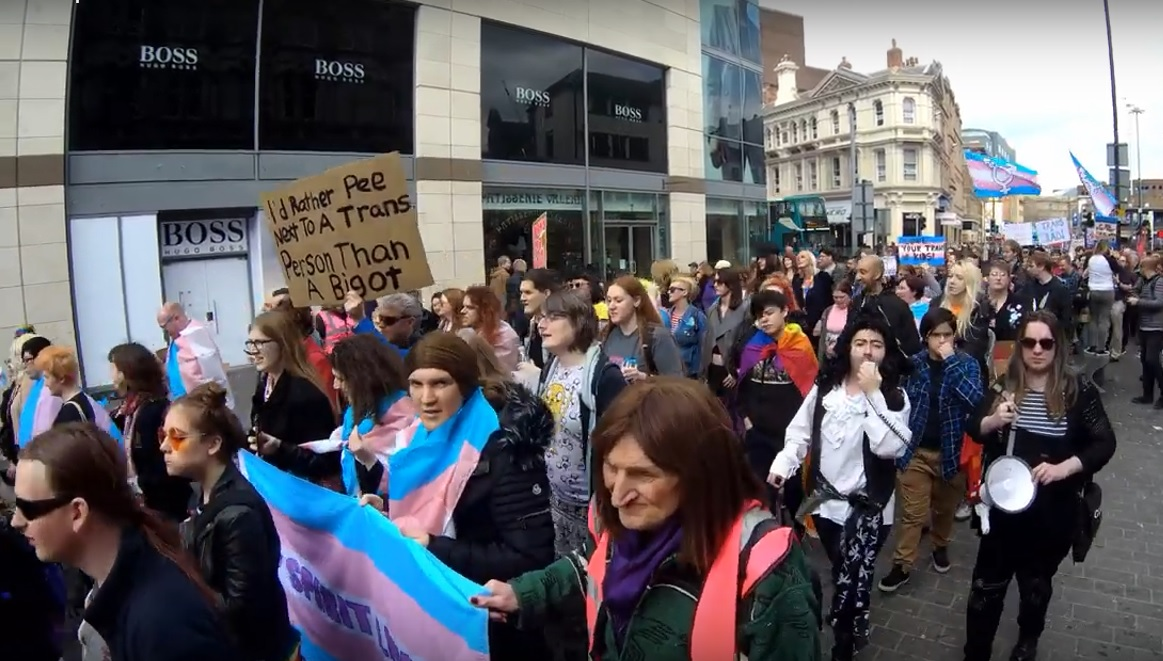
Liverpool Trans Pride March 2019

Liverpool is home to a large number of organisations that support the needs of the transgender community. Many of the organisations provide advocacy, advice or guidance in accessing medical treatment on the NHS or campaign for and champion trans rights. Groups in the Liverpool area include In-Trust Merseyside, LIV.FAST Network, Liverpool Action for Trans Health, Sefton Embrace, Spirit Level, The Action Youth, Trans Health Merseyside and TransWirral.

The Navajo Merseyside & Cheshire LGBT Charter Mark is sponsored by local transgender groups and acknowledges organisations that meet certain standards of good practice towards the LGBT community. More than 60 organisations have achieved the Charter mark standards throughout the Liverpool area to date.

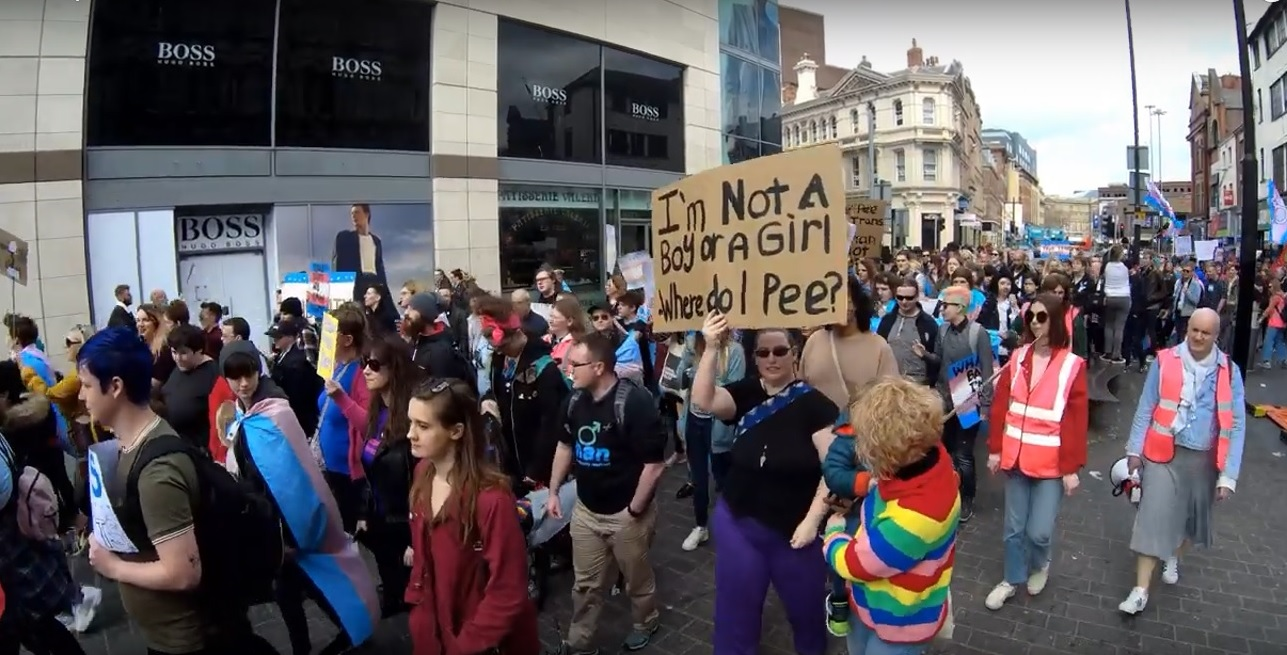
Liverpool Trans Pride March 2019

In 2019, Liverpool held its very first Trans Pride on International Transgender Day of Visibility (TdoV). A Trans Pride march, a number of awareness, education and celebratory events were held in the city. Whilst this was the first Trans Pride, Liverpool has a long history of celebrating the transgender community and flies the transgender Pride flag every year from public buildings on TdoV.

In September 2018, Liverpool City Council approved a motion in support of trans people which stated that the council believes "TRANS WOMEN ARE WOMEN" and that "there is no place in our city for hatred and bigotry." The motion came in response to concurrent anti-trans campaigns that had taken place in Liverpool whilst the British government was proposing to simplify the process of legally changing genders. The city vowed to remove anti-trans stickers seen around Liverpool, the Town Hall and other public buildings would be lit up in the trans colours of blue, white and pink and local planning officers would "actively encourage" developers and businesses to include gender-neutral toilets in public buildings.

== Timeline of Liverpool-related LGBT facts ==
Date	
1960	Liverpool born April Ashley became Britain's first transsexual.
1974 (February)	The first ever lesbian kiss on UK television took place on a BBC Two drama titled 'Girl’. The kiss was shared between Liverpool born Alison Steadman and Myra Frances. (Not to be confused with the first pre-watershed kiss on Brookside – also a Liverpool LGBT first.)
1976	Gay Youth 'R' Out (GYRO) was founded in Liverpool, now officially the UK's longest running LGBT youth group.
1984 (June)	Liverpool pop band Frankie Goes To Hollywood, fronted by openly gay band members Holly Johnson and Paul Rutherford, scored the longest-running number-one single in the UK of the 1980s. Their song, Two Tribes, spent nine weeks at the top spot. The band were also the second act ever to top the Official UK Singles Chart with their first three singles since Gerry & The Pacemakers (also from Liverpool). Frankie Goes To Hollywood rose to initial fame thanks to their first single Relax, widely noted as one of the most controversial songs of the decade. To date it is the 6th best selling single in the UK of all time.
1985	Liverpool based soap opera, Brookside, featured the first openly gay character on a British TV series.
1994	Liverpool based soap opera, Brookside, broadcast the UK's first pre-watershed lesbian kiss.
1994 (February)	Liverpool born, Edwina Currie, became the first British MP to introduce a motion in the House of Commons to equalise the age of consent for gay men. Her motion was narrowly defeated and instead of an equal age at 16, the age of consent was instead lowered to 18. Currie has since said "As a Jewish Scouse female, I knew enough about discrimination and could never see the justification for [an unequal age of consent]".
1997	Angela Eagle, MP for Wallasey (Merseyside), became Britain's first 'out' lesbian MP.
1999	Wallasey born Caroline Paige, became the first openly-serving transgender officer in the British Armed Forces. She joined the Royal Air Force in 1980 prior to her transition and then continued to serve after her gender reassignment in 1999.
2001	The UK's first ever televised gay wedding was screened live on air from Liverpool's Albert Dock on ITV's This Morning.
2002 (October)	A 30-year-old lesbian from Liverpool became the first person to successfully challenge the British government's unfair discrimination against homosexual couples under the Mental Health Act 1983. Following her landmark legal proceedings against Liverpool City Council and the Secretary of State for Health, the government was forced to change the law under the European Convention on Human Rights. It was accepted that the gay partners of mental health patients in same sex relationships would qualify as 'nearest relatives' and, therefore, they would have the same rights as heterosexual unmarried couples.
2005	Liverpool Register Office became the UK's first to include a gay couple on the front cover of official civil ceremony promotional material.
2008	Angela Eagle, MP for Wallasey (Merseyside), became the first female Member of Parliament to enter a civil partnership.
2010 (August)	Hollyoaks, produced and filmed at the Liverpool-based Lime Pictures studios, became the first ever British soap opera to introduce a teenage transsexual storyline.
2010 (September)	The Lib Dems became Britain's first major political party to formally endorse same-sex marriage. They made the official announcement at their Liverpool party conference.
2011 (March)	Liverpool born Anton Hysén came out as Sweden's first openly gay male footballer and the second openly gay high-level footballer in the world, ever.
2011 (November)	Liverpool became the first British city to officially recognise a gay quarter with rainbow street signs.
2012 (May)	Liverpool was the first city in the world to officially mark IDAHO with a programme of free events.
2012 (June)	Ullet Road Unitarian Church, Liverpool, hosted the first UK civil partnership on religious premises.
2012 (July)	Liverpool Football Club became the first Premier League club ever to be officially represented at a UK 'Pride'. Liverpool Pride was the first Pride in the country to achieve the feat.
2013 (March)	Liverpool's Echo Arena hosted the UK's very first National Gay Wedding Show with 200 exhibitors providing products and services from across the whole wedding market.
2013 (May)	Liverpool became the first UK city with a gay couple as first citizens. Lord Mayor Gary Millar was sworn in whilst his civil partner, Steve Macfarlane, became Lord Mayor's Consort.
2013 (September)	Everton F.C. (based in the city of Liverpool), became the first Premier League football team to announce that its players would wear rainbow laces in support of an anti-homophobia campaign.
2015 (October)	Hollyoaks, produced and filmed at the Liverpool-based Lime Pictures studios, was the first ever British soap opera to cast an openly transgender actor to play a regular transgender character. Due to her role on the show, actress Annie Wallace who played the character Sally St Claire, went on to become the first ever transgender actor to be nominated for a BAFTA award.
2017 (June)	For the first time ever in a major British theatre Romeo and Juliet was made into a story about gay lovers. The production took place at Liverpool's Everyman Theatre.
2017 (November)	Liverpool Football Club became the first British Premier League club to become a Stonewall Diversity Champion. The programme by Europe's leading LGBT charity helps to create inclusive workplaces.
2018 (November)	For the first time in global history Gay Times held their annual award ceremony outside London (the UK's largest LGBT award ceremony). Gay Times Owner, James Frost, chose Liverpool as a 'wonderfully vibrant, thriving and culturally diverse city'.
2019 (May)	Liverpool born David Burton Sampson became Britain's first openly gay black mayor when he was sworn in as Mayor of Basildon, Essex.
2019 (November)	Liverpool drag queen The Vivienne was declared the UK's first ever RuPaul's Drag Race Superstar.
2020 (December)	Liverpool mum Adrianne Elson-Steven and her partner Michael became the first transgender couple to give birth to twins in UK history.
2020 (December)	Arthur Britney Joestar, an asylum seeker who settled in Liverpool, became the first non-binary person to be granted refugee status in a UK court. The landmark ruling concluded that Arthur would suffer persecution if sent back to El Salvador.
2021 (September)	In September 2021, Drew Cockton, founder of luxury fragrance brand Owen Drew, will hold the first-ever LGBTQ+ Business Awards for North West England, in the Liverpool City Region. The awards will represent business sectors in Liverpool City Region, Greater Manchester, Cheshire and Lancashire and will be rolled out nationally in 2022.
2021 (December)	Liverpool born April Ashley dies on 27 December at age 86.
2021 (December)	At Liverpool's 24 Kitchen Street, panels from the UK AIDS Memorial Quilt were on display in a nightclub for the first time in UK history. The exhibition was a celebration of LGBT resilience, queer history and health throughout history.
2022 (June)	Liverpool born John Hyland, former co-chair of Pride in Liverpool and founder of the Liverpool City Region Pride Foundation, became the first openly gay Councillor in Northern Ireland.
2023 (January)	Bingo Allison, whilst working as a vicar in Liverpool, came out as the first openly non-binary priest to be ordained in the Church of England.
2023 (May)	Liverpool was the host city of the Eurovision Song Contest 2023. Volunteers who helped to welcome visitors to the city received 'first of its kind' training on LGBT inclusion and diversity to support the contest's long held fan base in the LGBT community.
2023 (May)	The UK's first ever gay dating TV show had its world premiere at Everyman Cinema Liverpool. Presenter Dannii Minogue and a range of guests attended the premiere of the BBC Three show, I Kissed A Boy.

== TimNotable LGBT people from the Liverpool City Region ==
- Fisayo Akinade (Actor)
- Marc Almond (Musician, singer-songwriter)
- Martyn Andrews (TV presenter and broadcast journalist)
- April Ashley (Former transsexual model)
- Clive Barker (Author, film director, screenwriter, producer, actor, playwright, painter, illustrator & visual artist)
- Lee Baxter (singer)
- Danny Beard (RuPaul's Drag Race UK and Britain's Got Talent contestant)
- Chris Bernard (Film director)
- Pete Burns (Singer-songwriter)
- Chris Butler (Animator, writer and director)
- Dan Carden (MP, Labour Party politician)
- Marcus Collins (Singer)
- Craig Colton (Singer)
- Terence Davies (Screenwriter, film director, sometime novelist and actor)
- Shaun Duggan (Playwright, television writer)
- Angela Eagle MP (MP, Shadow Chief Secretary to the Treasury)
- Becky Easton (Footballer)
- Brian Epstein (Businessman, personal manager, impresario)
- Kenny Everett (Comedian, radio DJ and television entertainer)
- Alicya Eyo (Film and television actress)
- Yankel Feather (Painter)
- Robert Flemyng (Actor)
- Andi Fraggs (Singer-songwriter, producer)
- Victor Grayson (Politician, MP)
- Chelcee Grimes (Singer, songwriter, television presenter, and footballer)
- Liam Hackett (Founder & managing director of Ditch the Label)
- Kenneth Halliwell (Actor, writer and collagist)
- Antony Hamilton (Actor, model and dancer)
- Jonathan Harvey (playwright)
- Stephen Hough (Classical pianist, composer and writer)
- Anton Hysén (Football player)
- Holly Johnson (Musician, painter, writer)
- Amy Kane (English former football midfielder)
- Låpsley (Singer, songwriter, musician and producer)
- Leon Lopez (Actor, singer-songwriter, model, television presenter)
- William MacDonald (serial killer)
- Christopher Maloney (English singer) (Singer and musician)
- Ste McCabe (Singer, songwriter, radio DJ)
- Molly McCann (Mixed martial artist)
- John McGrath (artistic director)
- Don Melia (Cartoonist, editor, activist, and philanthropist)
- George Melly (Jazz and blues singer, lecturer, critic and writer)
- Kris Mochrie (Actor)
- Damien Moore (Member of Parliament for Southport)
- Paul O'Grady (Comedian, television presenter, actor, writer and radio DJ)
- Kele Okereke (Singer and rhythm guitarist)
- Lily Parr (Professional women's association football player)
- Pete Price (Radio presenter)
- Richard Quest (Journalist, reporter and anchor at CNN International)
- Steve Radford (Politician, former leader of the Liberal Party)
- Adele Roberts (Film and television actress)
- Paul Rutherford (Musician, singer)
- Sister Sister (Drag queen, RuPaul's Drag Race UK contestant)
- Graeme Smith (radio presenter)
- Luke Strong (gymnast)
- Magda Szubanski (Actress, comedian, television presenter, radio host & author)
- Tanya Tate (Glamour model, writer, international cosplayer and pornographic actress)
- Robert Thompson (Convicted for the murder of James Bulger)
- Vivienne, The (Drag queen, RuPaul's Drag Race UK ambassador)
- Tom Walmsley(Playwright, novelist, poet and screenwriter)
- Steven Webb (Actor in theatre, television and film)
- Rosie Wilby (Stand-up comedian & singer songwriter)
- Christopher Wood (English painter)
