= Stanley Street, Liverpool =

Street in Liverpool, England

Coordinates: 53.4073°N 2.98722°W

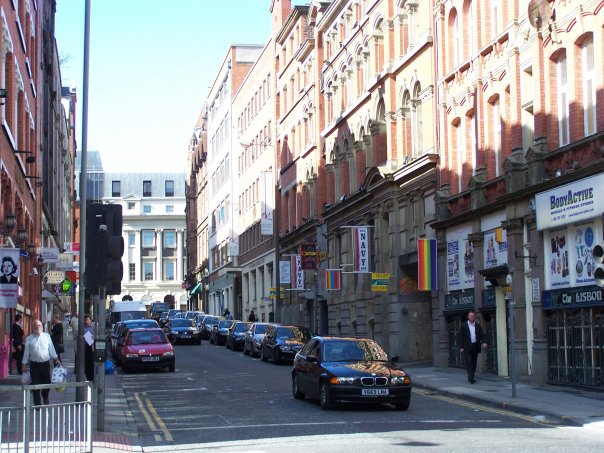
Stanley Street - The main street in Liverpool's Gay Quarter

Stanley Street, in the centre of Liverpool, England, runs south between Dale Street and Whitechapel. As well as being home to numerous businesses ranging from estate agents, solicitors, bars and restaurants, there are also apartments in upper floors of some of the buildings. As part of the Big Dig, the southern half of the street between Whitechapel and Victoria Street was repaved in 2007, and is used as a taxi-rank serving Liverpool's central shopping district and Mathew Street.

Stanley Street is also the symbolic heart of Liverpool's Pride Quarter.

== History ==
In the early 18th century, Stanley Street went by the name 'New' or 'News Street'. It was known as a place where second-hand, or ready-made, furniture was sold and nearly every building there was devoted to this trade. New Street became a local byword to mean 'everything that was rickety and sham' in the way of household goods. New Street originally ran between Dale Street and Frog Lane, which was later renamed to Whitechapel.

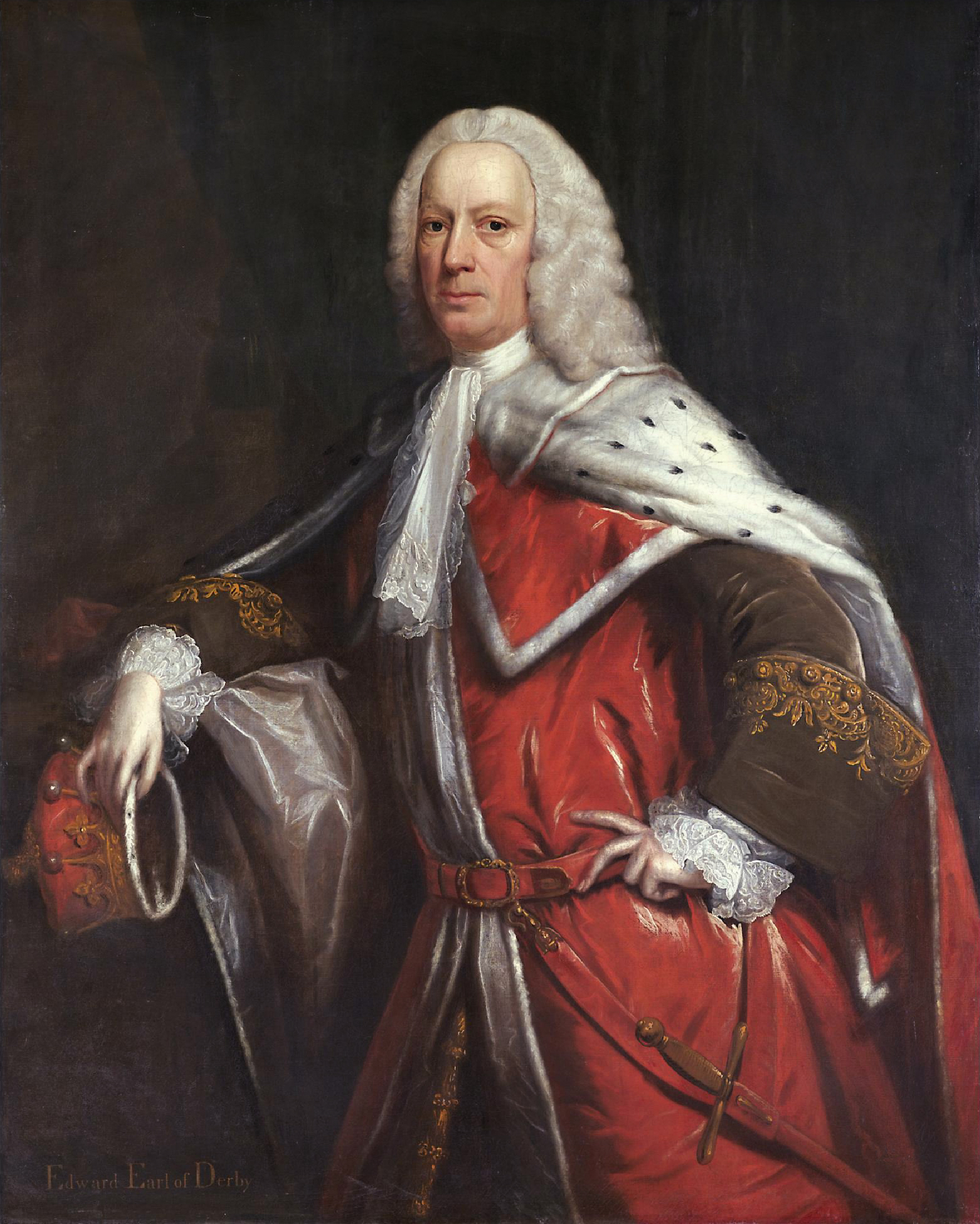
Edward Stanley, 11th Earl of Derby

During this time, a large portion of the land in the Dale Street area belonged to the Moores family of Bank Hall, Liverpool. When their estates were sold around 1712, the Dale Street property passed into the hands of a local aristocrat: Edward Stanley, 11th Earl of Derby, the Plumbes and others. In 1744, records held by the National Archives/Lancashire Archives show the transfer in ownership of the street between The Corporation of Liverpool and the Earl of Derby.

The record reads: "Lease for 999 years of a small piece of land for an opening out of Frog Lane into a new street intended to be built by his Lordship, or his Lessees, leading from Frog Lane into Dale Street. Rent, a peppercorn"

Stanley Street was then laid out around the same time and took the name from Edward Stanley and his aristocratic family.

Victoria Street did not exist as a parallel street to Dale Street until around 1867 to 1868. When New Street was originally built, it was not linear as is seen on the present day Stanley Street. The land at the lower end did not originally belong to the Earl and, therefore, did not continue all the way to Frog Lane (later Whitechapel) in a straight line. It took on a zigzag course as a result. When Stanley Street was leased by the Earl, the upper end became known as 'Upper Stanley Street', while the lower end was known as 'Lower Stanley Street', or 'Derby Street', for a significant period after. After Victoria Street was built in 1867 to 1868, this was altered and Stanley Street then formed a straight line leading from Dale Street to Whitechapel, as it is seen today.

There are several Grade II listed buildings on Stanley Street (see Listed buildings in Liverpool), due to their local historical importance. A number of blocks survive from the 1860s to the 1880s, which were originally built to accommodate offices and warehouses. During this period, some of the buildings were used to store cheese, bacon, butter and fresh and dried fruit. Granite Buildings of circa 1882, by G E Grayson, is an example of a building designed for offices to be accessed on Stanley Street itself, while the rear elevation on Progress Place was used to raise and lower merchandise throughout the block.

Stanley Street was also the location for Liverpool's first synagogue, in existence in the 1750s. The synagogue no longer stands, but a special commemorative plaque was unveiled in 2008 in Whitechapel, close to the original spot of the synagogue.

== The Beatles ==
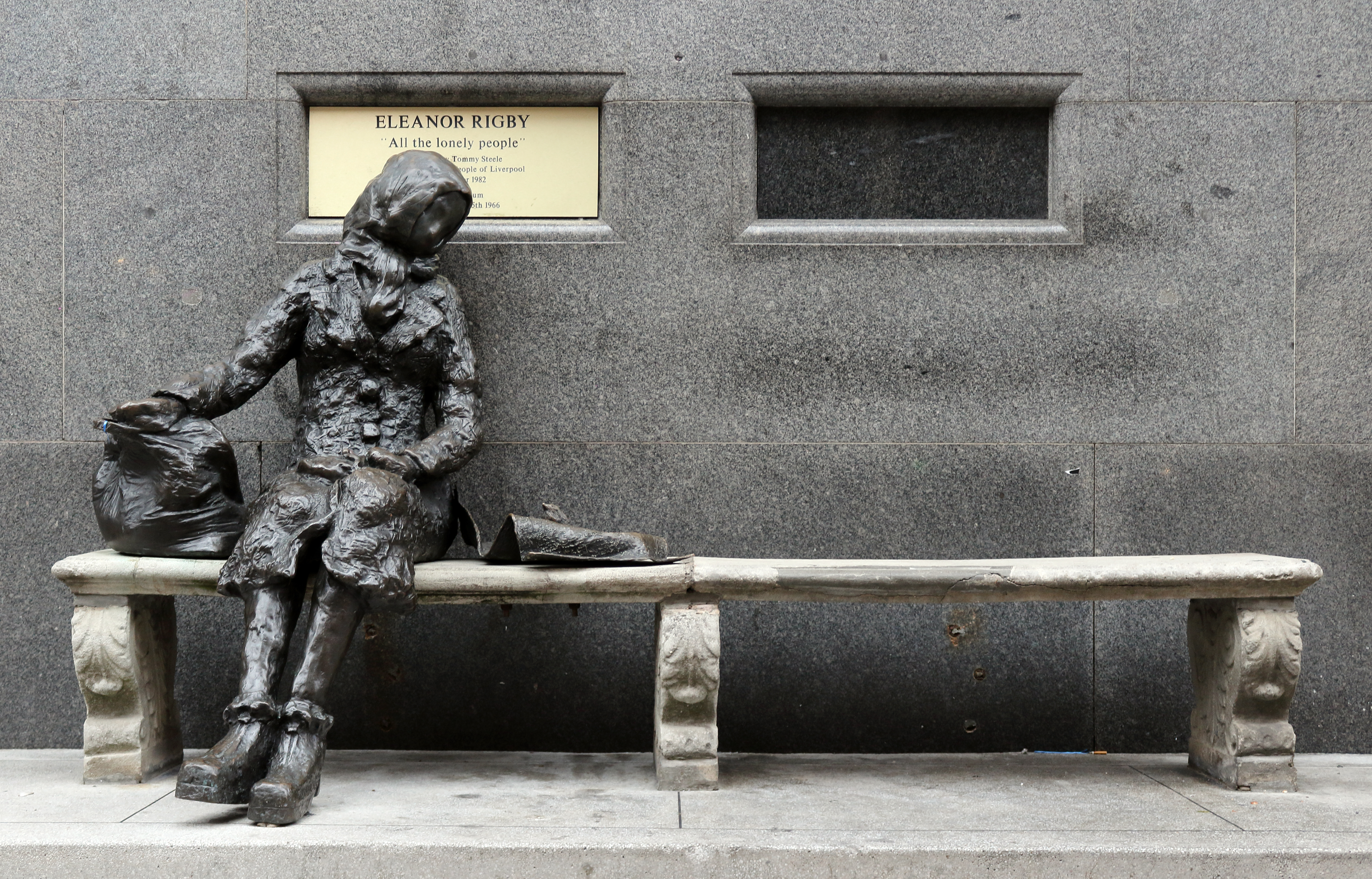
Eleanor Rigby Statue in Stanley Street

Stanley Street also gains considerable interest from Beatles fans, due to its close proximity to Mathew Street and the Cavern Quarter (home of The Cavern Club). It is the location of the statue of Eleanor Rigby, designed by London musician and artist Tommy Steele. The statue is dedicated to "All the lonely people", and was donated to the City of Liverpool in 1982 as a tribute to The Beatles. A hotel called 'The Eleanor Rigby Hotel' is also located here.

At the time when The Beatles were performing in Liverpool, Stanley Street was the site of Hessy's Music store, one of the city's biggest music retailers. It was here that Mimi Smith (John Lennon's aunt), bought Lennon his first guitar in 1957. The street has also been home to an independent radio station, Radio City.

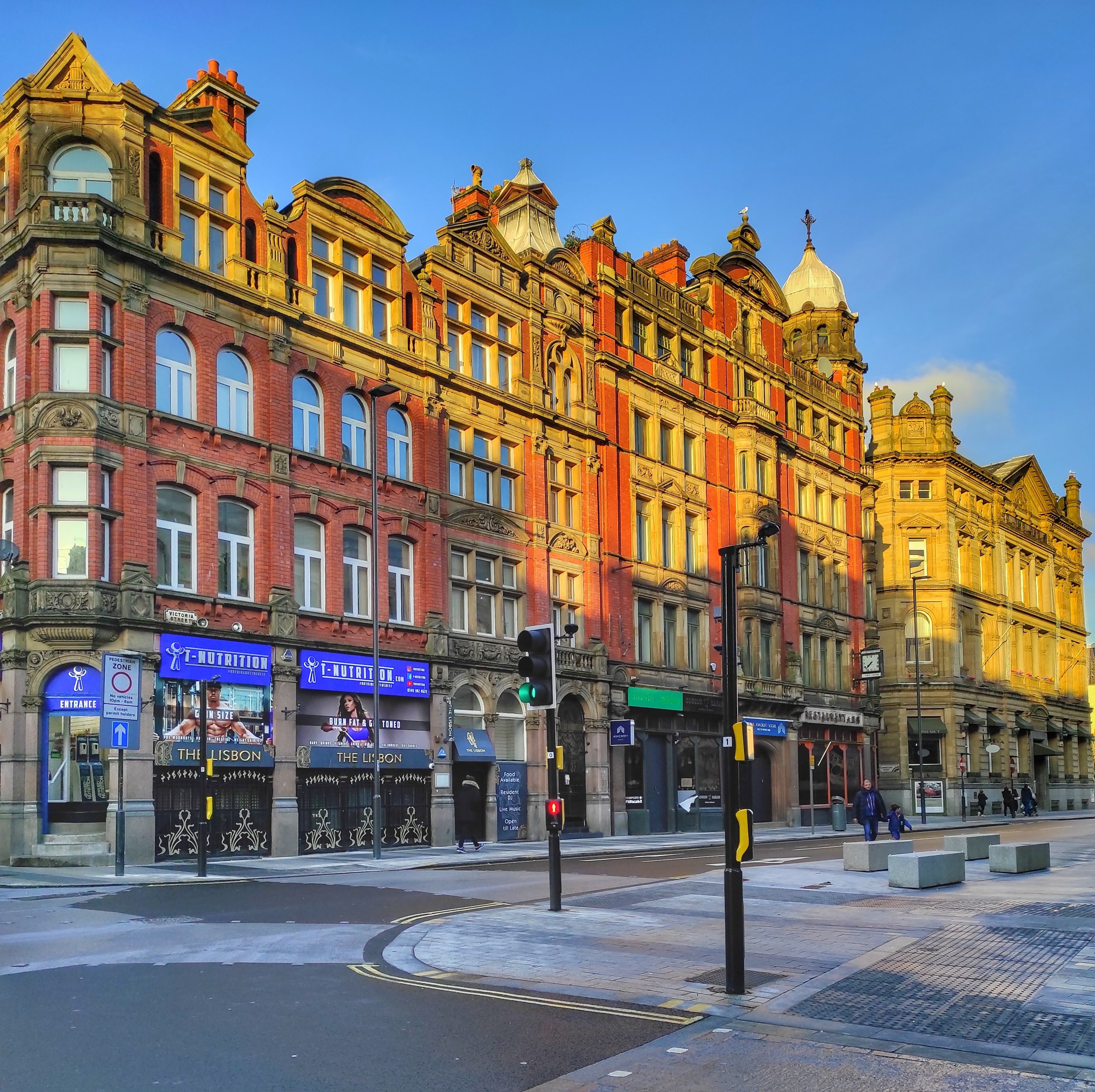
The Lisbon gay pub, Grade II listed

== LGBT Community ==
Stanley Street is also very much a focal point for Liverpool's LGBT community and is home to a cluster of gay bars and clubs between Dale St and Victoria Street. Stanley Street is the most recognised and referenced street in Liverpool's Pride Quarter.

In response to campaigns from members of Liverpool's LGBT community, including Councillor Steve Radford, of Liverpool-based Liberal Party (UK, 1989), Liverpool City Council, approved the partial pedestrianisation of Stanley Street in 2009, between Victoria Street and Dale Street. With the use of rising automatic hydraulic bollards from 10pm-6am every night, the intention was to enhance the night time leisure experience of the area and to promote it as part of the gay quarter. Liverpool's LGBT community has roots in the area since the 1970s, although more recently there have been campaigns for it to be a more popular tourist destination for the LGBT Community. A report for Liverpool City Council in 2011 suggested the possibility of earlier closure of Stanley Street, from 6pm onwards each day. The longest established gay venue on the corner of Stanley Street/Victoria Street is 'The Lisbon', housed in The Lisbon Buildings, just below street level. Its unique ceiling is arguably its most admirable feature, and is often the first thing people notice when inside. The other bars on Stanley Street tend to be newer additions to the gay scene.
