= Pride Quarter, Liverpool =

Gay quarter in Liverpool, UK

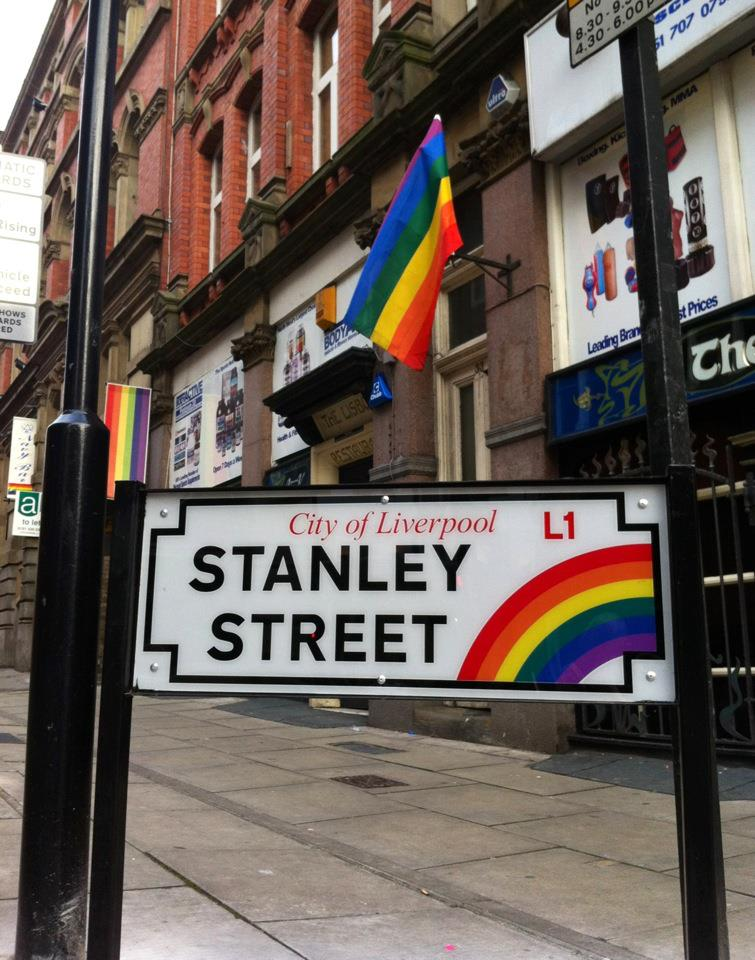
- (Above) Rainbow street sign on Stanley Street. (Below) Map of LGBT venues in the Pride Quarter (October 2023)
- Interactive map of Pride Quarter, Liverpool
- Location: Liverpool City Centre, Liverpool, England, UK
- Postal code: L1/L2
- Coordinates: 53°24′26″N 2°59′13″W
- North: Dale Street
- East: Cumberland Street
- South: Victoria Street
- West: Eberle Street

Other
- Known for: LGBT community, Gay bars & clubs, Gay clubbing, Liverpool Pride

The Pride Quarter, also known as the Stanley Street Quarter, Liverpool Gay Quarter or Village, is an area within Liverpool City Centre, England. It serves as the main focal point for Liverpool's lesbian, gay, bisexual and transgender community. The quarter is made up of mixed use developments including residential blocks, hotels, bars, nightclubs and various other businesses, many of which cater for the LGBT community. Aspects of the annual Liverpool Pride are also held in and around Stanley Street.

The neighbourhood encompasses Stanley Street, Davies Street, Cumberland Street, Sir Thomas Street, Dale Street, Temple Street & Lane, Victoria Street, Hackins Hey, Leather Lane and Eberle Street. Stanley Street has often been seen as the symbolic heart of the 'gay quarter' due to being the location of 'The Lisbon' pub, Liverpool's oldest gay venue, which has claimed an LGBT following since the 1960s.

On 12 August 2011, Liverpool City Council officially recognised the area as the city's 'gay quarter'.

In June 2021, the district was rebranded as the 'Pride Quarter' with support from the Liverpool City Region Pride Foundation and Marketing Liverpool. The rebrand was intended to refresh and unite the UK's first formally recognised LGBT+ area. It was also intended to cement the city's position as 'the most LGBT+ friendly in the UK' and mitigate the impact of COVID-19 restrictions on the various venues.

To officially launch the reinvention, 13 LGBT venues in the quarter held the ‘Pride Quarter Indoor Festival’ on Saturday 31 July 2021. A dedicated page on the Visit Liverpool website was launched to promote the neighbourhood as a destination in the city. Banners revealing the quarter's new identity were also installed on Stanley Street.

== History of LGBT Liverpool ==
=== Victorian criminalisation to Queen Square ===
In keeping with Liverpool's history as a major seafaring port, the local gay community can be traced as far back as the Victorian era. Research into this area has been on the whole scarce in the past, however, interest has grown considerably in recent times.

In his 2011 lecture, Policing Sex Between Men: 1850–1971, historian Jeff Evans examined 70,000 criminal records dating back to 1850. He was able to shed light on hundreds of records of men prosecuted under the Criminal Law Amendment Act 1885 (the law used to prosecute Oscar Wilde) found in the court papers of Liverpool and North West England.

Due to the legacy of Victorian laws and homosexual criminalisation, the city's lesbian and gay community would be largely underground for the next century and little is known about it during this period. However, recent research has highlighted the existence of an unofficial gay quarter around Queen Square from as early as the 1940s, which earned itself the nickname "Covent Garden of the North". Although sex between consenting men was not decriminalised until the Sexual Offences Act 1967, the gay community enjoyed relative acceptance in this area. Establishments such as the Stork Hotel, the Roebuck, Spanish House, Magic Clock, Royal Court, and The Dart all boasted a substantial gay clientele, albeit liaisons were still held in secret to a degree. By the early 1970s, a society named 'The Homophile Society', which campaigned for homosexual equality, was formed at the University of Liverpool.

=== Queen Square to Stanley Street ===
The building of the new St. John's Shopping Centre and subsequent demolition of the original Queen Square meant the gay community was forced to find a new home. By 1972, with the opening of Paco's, the community had now began to settle around Stanley Street in what was to develop into Liverpool's modern day Pride Quarter.

=== Timeline of Liverpool's LGBT scene ===
Date	Sequence of Events	Sources
1940s – 1960s	Queen Square the centre of Liverpool's original gay quarter	
1960s – 1970s	Building of St. John's Shopping Centre marks beginning of decline for original gay scene. Landscape of Queen Square changed as Roe Street Gyratory and bus station opens. Original gay bar, The Stork, is demolished in 1975.	
1970s – 1980s	Critical mass of gay venues now centred on Stanley Street. Opening of several gay establishments in the area including Jody's, The Curzon, The Lisbon, and Paco's. First recorded Liverpool Gay Pride Festival took place in 1979.	
10 Dec 2009	Stanley St/Cumberland St/Eberle St are pedestrianised at night	
7 Aug 2010	City's first "Official" Pride festival held in the Gay Quarter	
February 2011	Plans to revamp gay quarter unveiled by Liverpool City Council	
6 Aug 2011	Main focus of Liverpool Pride is relocated to Pier Head. G-Bar, Garlands, and the informal Liverpool Gay Business Association organise first ever independent Gay Quarter Pride to complement existing celebrations	
12 Aug 2011	Liverpool City Council officially recognises Gay Quarter as a distinct city centre district. Plans to revamp the area are approved	
11 Nov 2011	Liverpool becomes the first British city to install rainbow street signs identifying the Gay Quarter	
6 Dec 2013	Liverpool City Council cabinet members endorse the creation of the Stanley Street Quarter Community Interest Company	
13 June 2021	To coincide with the tenth anniversary of formal recognition as an LGBT neighbourhood, the area was officially rebranded as the 'Pride Quarter'.	

=== Further research ===
Research into Liverpool's gay past took a significant turning point in 2004 as part of the inaugural Homotopia celebrations, the city's home grown gay arts festival. A major project titled 'Tales From Yester-Queer', organised in conjunction with The Armistead Project, Unity Theatre and Liverpool Record Office, became the first ever attempt to pay tribute to the experiences of older lesbian and gay Liverpudlians. The project involved collecting and collating various spoken, written and video sources, as well as a short film commission 'Gayzin Liverpool', produced by local filmmaker Sandi Hughes.

The event became the catalyst for a major public perspective of gay and lesbian Liverpool and shortly followed was 'Our Story Liverpool', an oral history resource which recorded the experiences of community members from the 1930s to the present day.

A similar and more recent project titled "Pink: Past & Present" has also explored the rich lesbian and gay history of the city which had its world premier in November 2010.

== Regeneration schemes ==
=== Victoria Street redesign ===
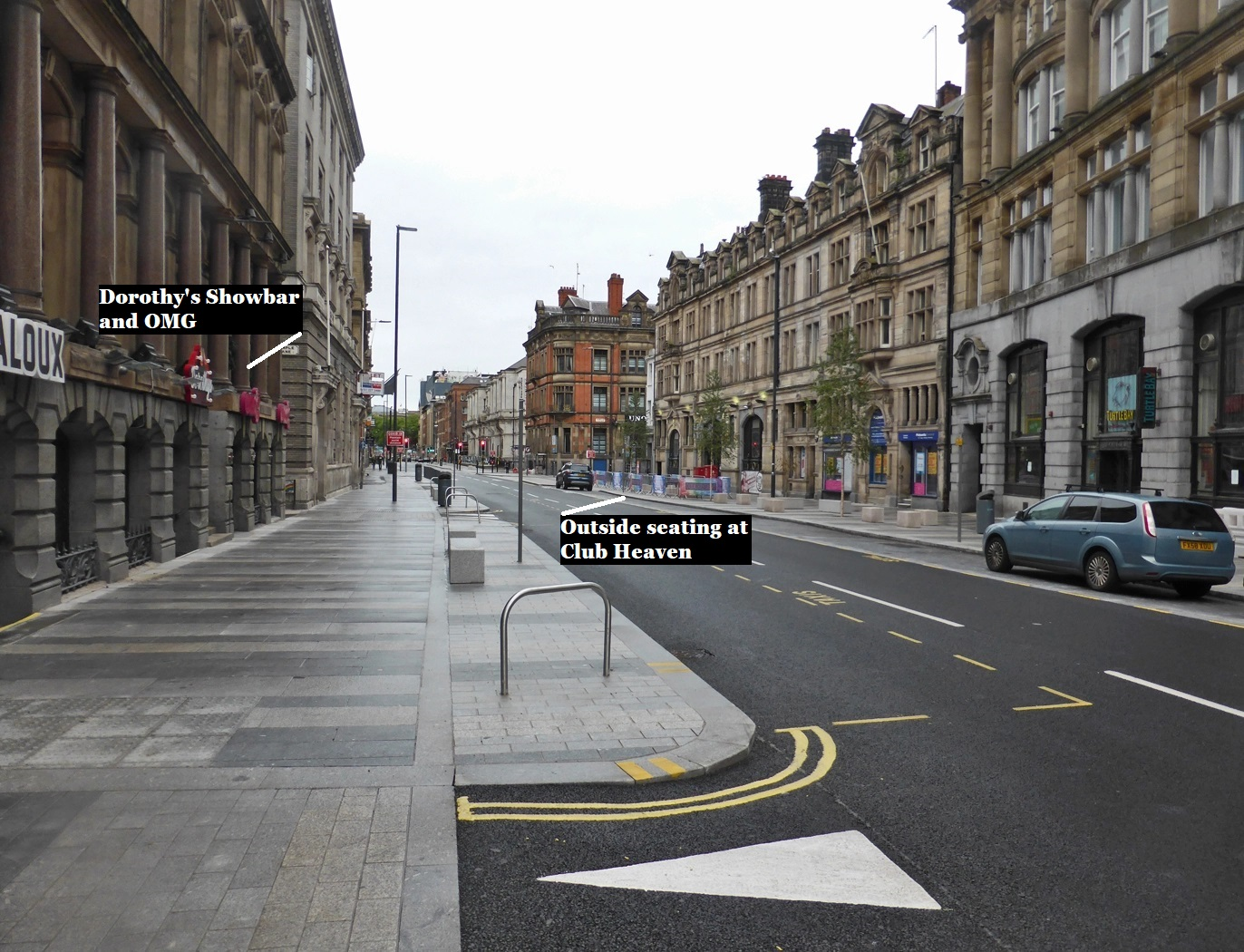
Public realm improvements on Victoria Street (July 2020)

As part of the Liverpool City Centre Connectivity (LCCC) scheme, a major redesign of Victoria Street began in February 2019 which fully completed in July 2020.

The entire length of Victoria Street, running from North John Street to the Queensway tunnel, underwent changes to the public realm. Pavements were widened, trees were planted, bus stops were removed and relocated. The scheme was designed to accommodate street cafes.

During the COVID-19 pandemic lockdowns and restrictions, prominent LGBT venues including The Lisbon, OMG, Dorothy's Show Bar, On Point and Heaven began to utilise the new widened pavements by introducing outdoor seating areas.

=== Eberle Street redesign ===
On the Liverpool Pride weekend of July 2016, a revamp of Eberle Street was unveiled. The original tarmac footway and concrete kerbing was removed and replaced with decorated paving. The overhaul featured illustrations from the Wizard of Oz including Dorothy's ruby slippers and her dog Toto.

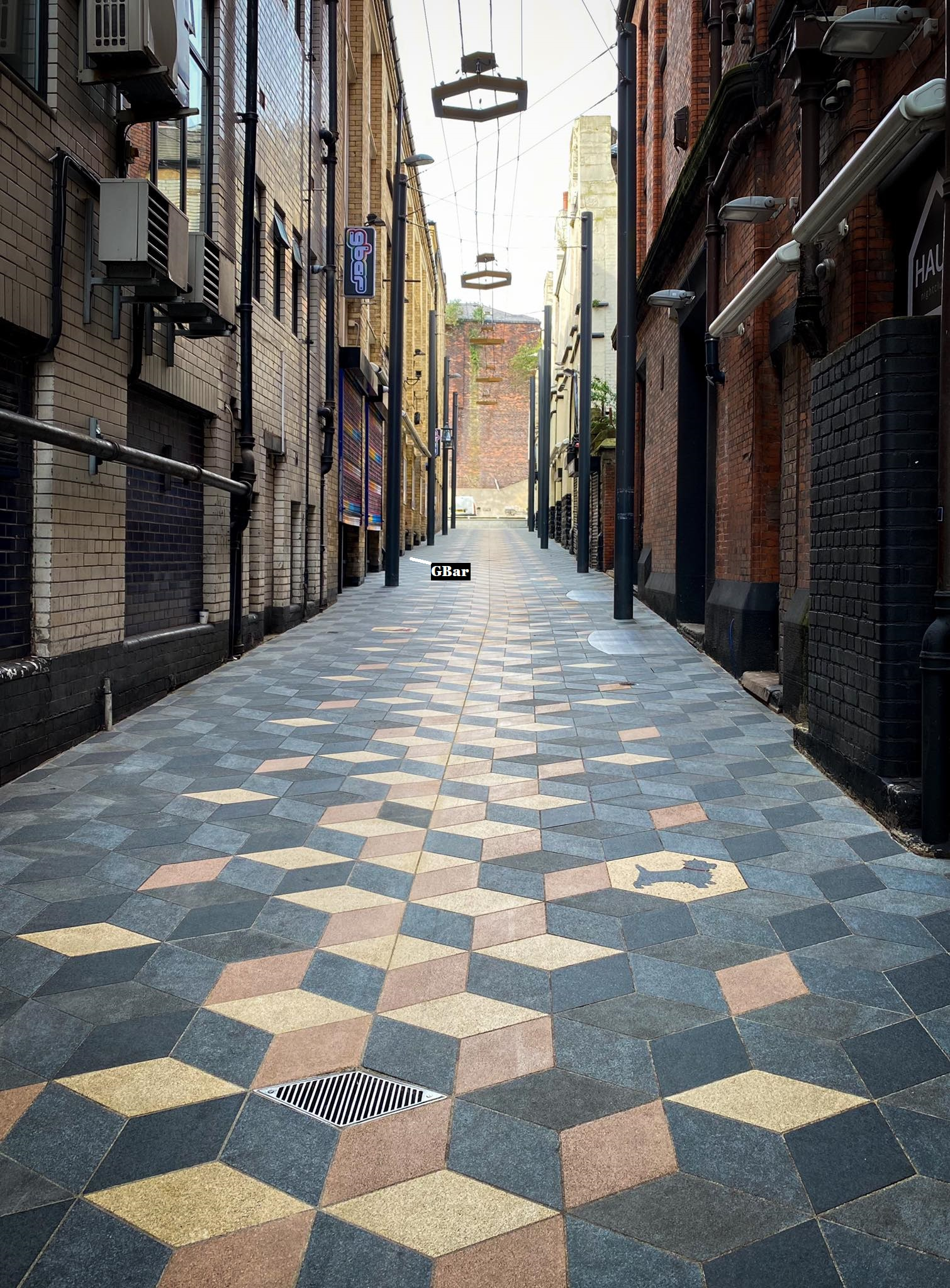
Eberle Street public realm improvements (March 2020)

The references were chosen to celebrate the heritage and history of Eberle Street as part of the city's LGBT community, particularly as the home of long-standing gay venues G-Bar and Garlands (named after Judy Garland).

=== Pedestrianisation ===
The process of partially pedestrianising the gay quarter began in June 2008. Liverpool City Council launched a Public consultation on the partial closing of streets in the neighbourhood, with a view to enhancing the night time leisure experience. The council had originally proposed to restrict traffic in Stanley Street, Cumberland Street and Eberle Street after 6pm with the use of automatic hydraulic bollards at strategic locations.

After various businesses raised concerns over restricted access to the streets, the city council proposed to reduce hours of street closure and held a second consultation in November 2008. It was decided that reduced hours of street closure would be a compromise to accommodate deliveries to some day-time businesses in the area.

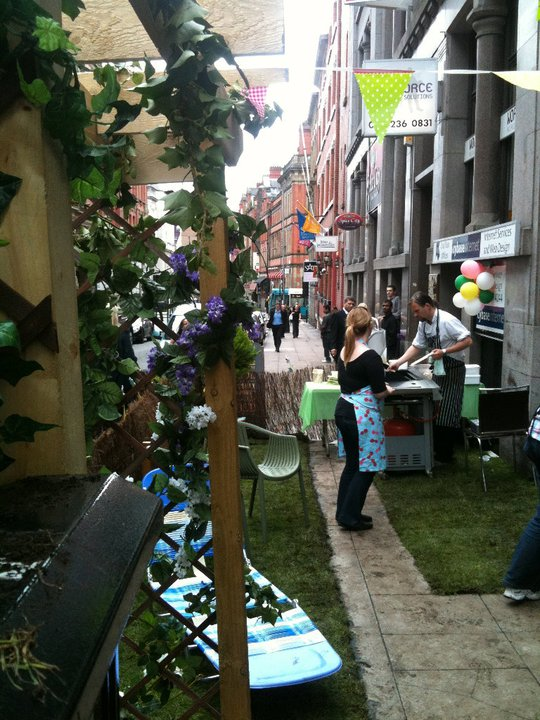
Regular community events now take place on Stanley Street thanks to partial pedestrianisation

As a result of campaigns from the LGBT community, the council held a third consultation between Friday 23 January 2009 and Friday 20 February 2009, and proposed longer hours of pedestrianisation. After analysing public opinion, the city council decided that hours proposed the third time round were insufficient in ensuring pedestrian safety.

A fourth and final consultation was held in September 2009 and no objections from the public were lodged.

Liverpool's gay quarter was finally pedestrianised on 10 December 2009. Stanley Street is now closed to traffic between 10pm-6am seven days of the week, Cumberland Street is closed between 6pm-6am seven days of the week, and Eberle Street is closed for 24 hours of the day seven days of the week.

Thanks to partial pedestrianisation and a cooperative effort to promote the Stanley Street quarter to shoppers and tourists, a number of sporadic day time community events have been held over the years. In 2012, Mother's Day celebrations, an Arts & Literature Day, street entertainment, pavement cafes and a series of markets were held.

=== Earlier redevelopment proposals ===
Original plans to completely revamp Liverpool's gay quarter were unveiled in February 2011, but the plans did not come to fruition. City leaders argued that a vibrant gay village around Stanley Street was key to the economic success of Liverpool city centre as an international tourist destination. Urban planner Feria Urbanism carried out a £12,000 study in conjunction with the City Council which aimed to showcase the gay quarter amongst the best in the UK. The company consulted with businesses and residents in the area to see how public areas and safety could be improved. Shortly after the formation of the Stanley Street Quarter Community Interest Company the plans were revisited in 2014.

Councillor Nick Small, cabinet member for employment and skills, said: "We have made strides in recent years and are being seen as a more gay-friendly city than was the case a few years ago. We now need to look at how we can develop and promote the quarter."

As a result of the 2011 plans, numerous regeneration options for the gay quarter were under discussion. New rainbow coloured paving, artworks, gateway features, tree planting, new outdoor seating, street furniture and ideas for a new public square were explored. A consultation on Feria Urbanism's draft report titled "Stanley Street: Strategic direction for a vital urban quarter (May 2011)" took place. Suggestions for which organisations and stakeholders should take responsibility for proposed actions and recommendations were made. The original timeline of these proposals envisaged the first phase of regeneration to take place within 2–5 years which would then make way for a longer-term vision. As part of the first phase of redevelopment, Liverpool became the first city in the UK to install street signage bearing the rainbow coloured Gay Pride flag on 11 November 2011. The signage now identifies the city's Gay Quarter located on Stanley Street, Cumberland Street, Temple Lane, Eberle Street and Temple Street.

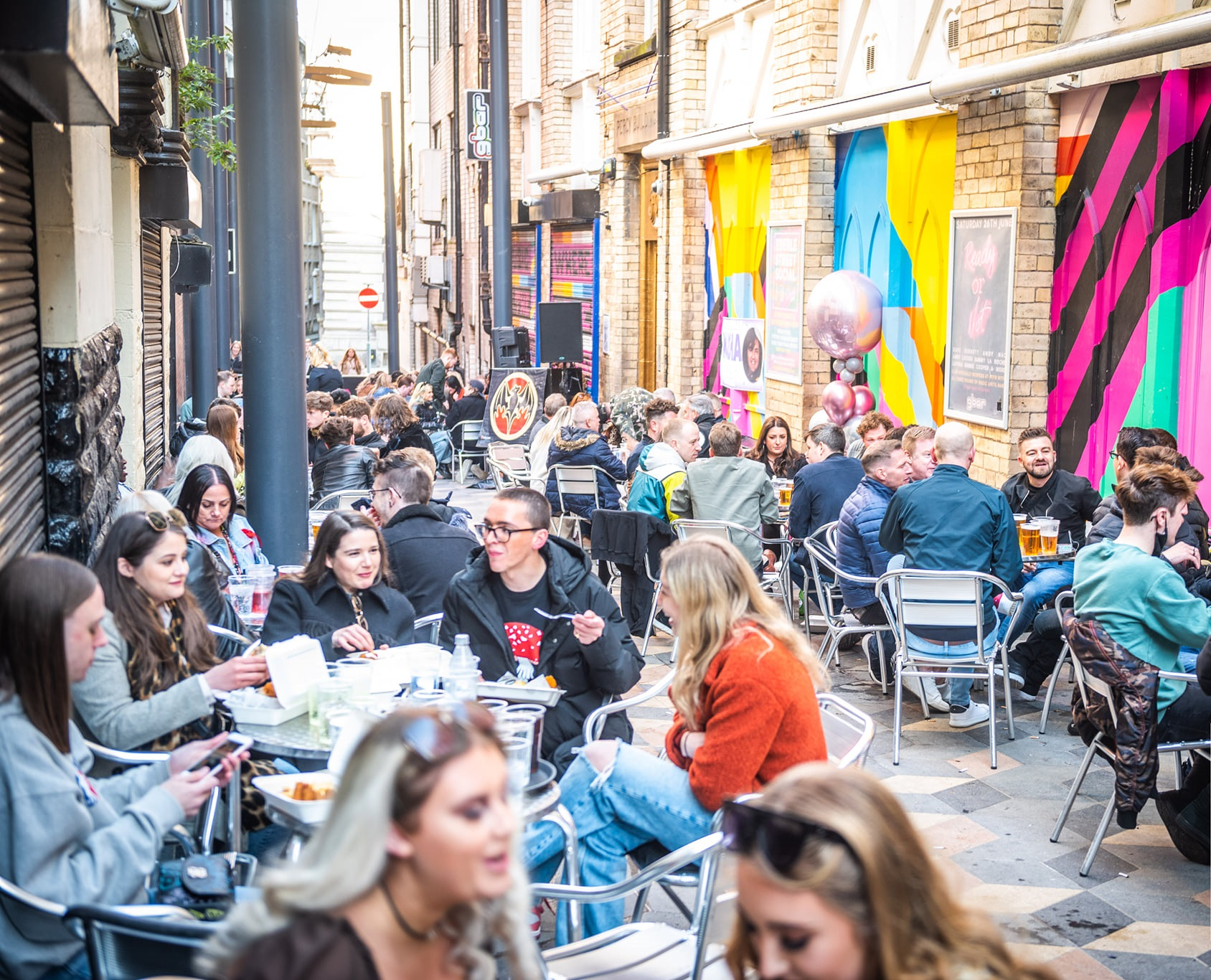
Outside seating on Eberle Street at GBar (May 2021)

== Community interest company ==
In December 2013, Liverpool City Council approved the formation of a dedicated Community interest company to help attract investment into and improve the quarter. The company was dissolved in 2018.

== Tourist destination ==
To celebrate the tenth anniversary of the Stanley Street district being formally recognised as an LGBT+ neighbourhood, the area was rebranded as the Pride Quarter, with support from LCR Pride Foundation and Marketing Liverpool. A dedicated page on the Visit Liverpool website was launched to promote the Pride Quarter as a tourist destination in the city. The gay quarter's nightlife, hospitality and events offering was featured on the page.

VisitBritain, Britain's national tourism agency, acknowledges Liverpool as one of Britain's most notable gay cities, and recognises the growing investment in the Gay Quarter. Liverpool City Council hopes that further investment, including partial pedestrianisation will further promote Liverpool as a gay destination.

In a similar fashion to most other major British cities, the gay scene of Liverpool is fast changing with several bars and clubs often changing in ownership and offer. There are roughly a dozen night time establishments operating in the quarter at any given time within a 200-metre (one eighth of a mile) radius of Stanley Street. There are also numerous other gay frequented venues dotted elsewhere around the city centre, particularly in the Baltic Triangle.

It is often argued that the oldest gay venue in the city is The Lisbon, which has claimed a considerable gay following since well before the 1970s.

== LGBT culture in Liverpool ==
Research commissioned by the North West Regional Development Agency approximated that there were around 94,000 LGBT persons living in Liverpool's metropolitan area by mid 2009 - equivalent to the GLB population of San Francisco.

== Crime ==
In recent years, a series of attacks have resulted in a call for increased police protection in the quarter. Perhaps the most high-profile attack was that of James Parkes, an off-duty trainee police officer, who was set upon by up to 20 teenage thugs in a homophobic attack outside the well known gay club Superstar Boudoir on Stanley Street in October 2009. Multiple skull fractures, a fractured eye socket and a fractured cheek bone left the officer fighting for his life. In May 2011, drag artist Lady Shaun suffered a broken jaw after being knocked out by a man who punched her in the face. Just two weeks earlier, 21-year-old choreographer Calvin Fox was assaulted by two people on his way home after a night out. In September the same year, two separate attacks in the gay quarter left two young men with serious head and facial injuries. Local authorities acknowledged there was indeed an increase in "homophobic" crime. Openly gay Councillor Steve Radford said, "Liverpool has a long way to travel in its journey to become a gay-friendly city". Chief Inspector Louise Harrington commented, "We have to strike a balance between a heavy police presence which could scare people off and those that say it makes them feel safer." In response to these events, Liverpool City Council took strides to improve the safety of the area, particularly after dark. Several community safety initiatives were implemented shortly after which included a marshalled Taxi Rank and the installation of gates on Progress Place, a section of private land off Stanley Street, where many of the attacks in the area have been linked as well as antisocial behaviour.

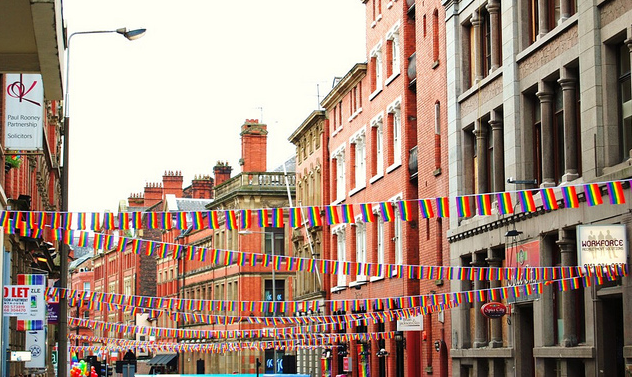
Rainbow buntings on Stanley Street at Liverpool Pride 2010

== Liverpool Pride ==
Up until 2010, Liverpool was the largest British city to not hold a Pride festival. On 7 August that year, the city's first "Official" Pride festival (officially sponsored by Liverpool City Council and public authorities), attracted an audience of over 21,000, the majority of whom came from outside the city. The festival took place around the city's Gay Quarter with stages on Dale Street, Exchange Flags, and North John Street, and a city centre march was held during the day. Organisers hailed the festivities a massive success and now plan to hold larger events in the future At Liverpool Pride 2011, it was announced that visitor numbers had doubled to over 40,000. On 11 March 2011, Liverpool Pride became a registered charity. In 2012 Liverpool Football Club were the first Premier League team to publicly support a Pride event with members of staff and fans marching in the parade with a banner provided by the club.
