= Yankel Feather =

English painter (1920–2009)

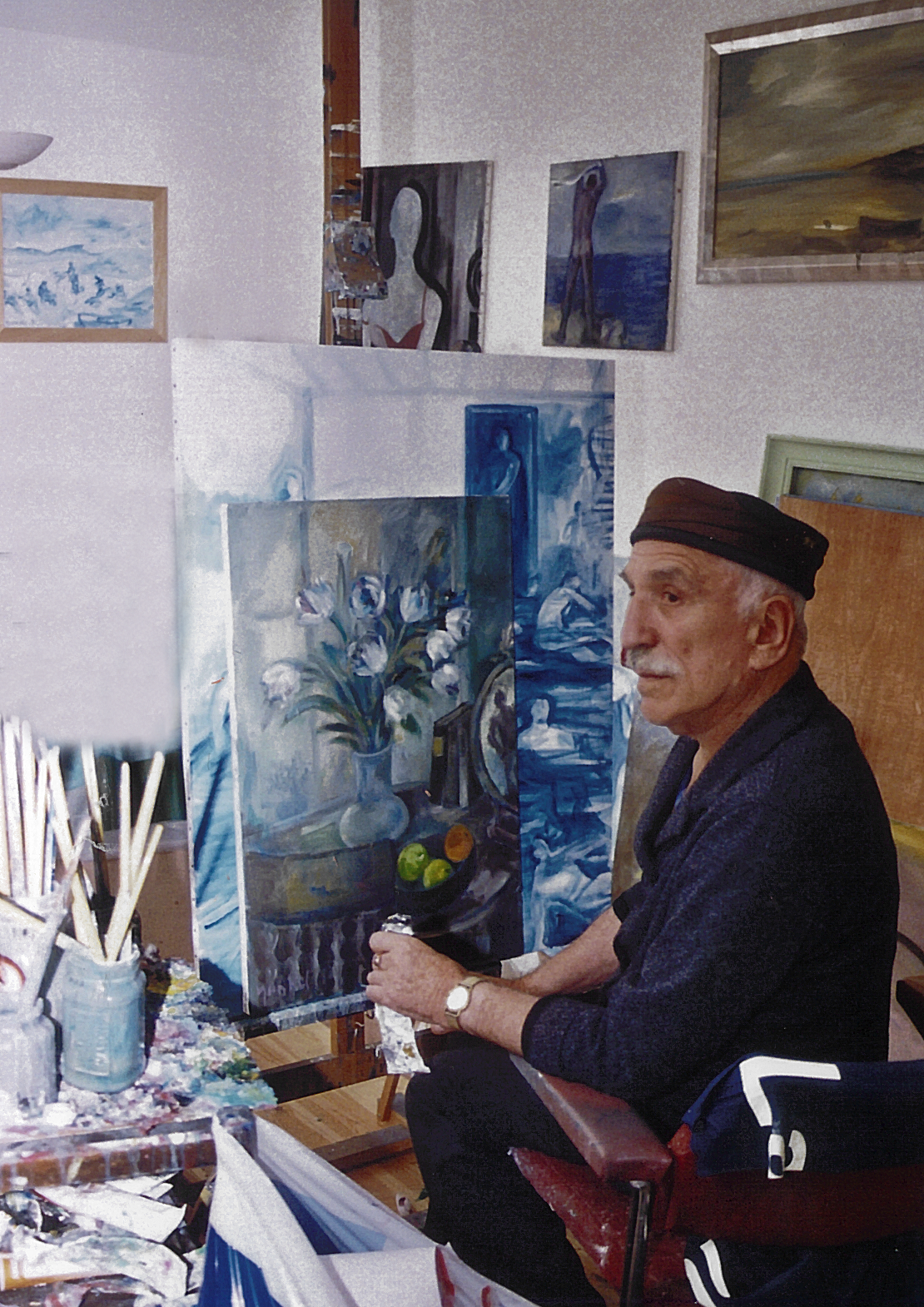
- Born: 21 June 1920; Liverpool
- Died: 18 April 2009 (aged 88); Hove
- Occupation: Painter
- Parent(s): Rachael Michelovsky (also known as Rachael (or Rose) Lewis), William Feather

Yankel Feather (21 June 1920 – 18 April 2009) was a British painter, and a member of the Liverpool Academy of Arts and the Newlyn Society of Artists. Paintings by Feather are in the public collections of the Royal Pavilion and the Walker Art Gallery. He was an expressionist painter. His early works were more formal, and in later works Feather's style became more expressive and changed as he began painting from memory. His subject matter included still lifes, populated scenes of Liverpool dance halls, and seascapes of his St Ives period.

== Early life ==
Feather was born in Toxteth Liverpool in 1920 into a poor family as the youngest of seven children. He went to Harrington County Primary School and later to a Jewish secondary school. Feather met his absentee father, an Austrian immigrant, only once. When he was fourteen his mother died. He took up painting after visits to the Walker Art Gallery.

In 1937, Feather joined his sister Leah in south London. He studied part-time under the potter Heber Matthews at Woolwich Polytechnic between 1937 and the outbreak of the Second World War.

== War years and beyond ==
At the beginning of the Second World War Feather returned to Liverpool. He was employed at the Rootes Aircraft Factory, before being conscripted into the Highland Light Infantry.

In his early life he was continuously struggling as he needed to earn a living while also finding time for his passion to become an artist. His first solo exhibition was at Gibbs Book Shop in Manchester in 1940. He became friends with Terry Frost in 1947. Frost later recalled: "I owe a lot to Yankel Feather, one of my first painter critics in 1947. I soon realised he was a bit of a Van Gogh person, full of talent, bursting with a trapped enthusiasm, supported by a genuine love of art and art history. I first saw his work when the Hanover Gallery had offered him a show. Wow! This was around 1948 and he was painting thickly, and with love, still lifes of flowers."

He acquired his artistic techniques though observation of works of the great masters, such as Velasquez, Rembrandt and Degas, in public galleries in Liverpool and London. He remembered their techniques and applied them in his art throughout his career. He took studios at Park Walk in Chelsea in the Forties and became part of the artistic bohemian fringe whilst working as a telephone operator. Feather exhibited at Helen Lessore's Beaux Arts Gallery in London during the 1950s.

== Liverpool ==
In the 60s and 70s he was well known in the city, owning night clubs and antique shops. During the time when Merseybeat hit the world his friends were Brian Epstein, The Beatles, Cilla Black, Adrian Henri, Arthur Ballard, George Jardine and many more. While in Liverpool he exhibited with the Liverpool Academy of Art alongside Sam Walsh, Maurice Cockrill, Adrian Henri, Don McKinlay, Nicolas Horsfield and Mike Lawson. He attended various art schools. His works are in his own distinctive style - strong, with lightness of brushstrokes over strong linear form with lots of movement.

Feather's Liverpool roots influenced him both socially and professionally. Inspired by Lowry, whom he met at the Walker Art Gallery and visited at Mottram during the mid-1960s, Feather contrived from memory evocations of his working-class roots. His later pictures of boys playing football on dockside waste land or of the vast edifices on the Mersey front, shared the documentary nostalgia of Lowry's mills and terraced streets. Feather also showed with perverse pride a coveted but damaged painting slashed by an irate John Lennon, whom Feather, an acquaintance of Brian Epstein, had evicted from The Basement. Another acquaintance, Peter Brown, an employee of the Beatles' organisation Apple, invited Feather into Savile Row premises in 1970 where he saw the break-up of The Beatles at first hand. Ringo Starr was one of many notable Liverpudlian owners of Feather's exuberant, poetic work.

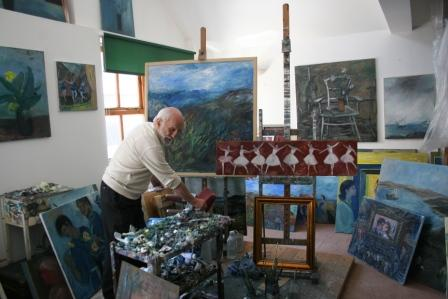

== Cornwall ==
Feather sold his club in Liverpool in 1967 and after trading for ten years in antiques he was able to retire to Cornwall in 1977. He became a lifelong friend of the abstract artist Sir Terry Frost. It was here that Feather started to come to public notice and gain recognition for the quality of his work.

He lived near St Just in west Cornwall for 20 years, painting prolifically and exhibiting at the Salthouse and New Millennium Galleries in St Ives during the 1980s and 1990s.

== Personal life ==
Openly gay, Feather found love with two long-term partners late in life. He met Bill King whilst living in Cornwall. King died in 1993 from a heart attack. Terry Arbuckle shared his studio home at Hove in Brighton. He expressed his sexuality in a series of simplified linear paintings which show an anonymous and austere outline absent from other paintings.

== Art ==
Yankel Feather's paintings all come from distinctive periods of his life and work. His early years during the Mersey Beat days in Liverpool, depict rhythmical colourful movement in crowded dancehalls at a time when he was a club owner.

Inspired by the atmosphere in his Basement Club in Liverpool (set up by Feather in 1958) he painted every aspect of dance: from the Twist during World War II to Rock 'n' Roll, to decades of ballet shows. Feather's paintings also explore Cornish landscapes and seascapes, market scenes from Morocco and views of a crowded Brighton beach.

Throughout his life, flowers were a recurrent subject matter, acting as a bridge between the vibrant dancehalls and the bleak British coastline.

Yankel Feather believed he was born to be an artist. Despite being born into harsh poverty and having little academic training, Yankel was determined to pursue his career, and more importantly, his passion in painting. Feather painted almost always from memory.

"From Velasquez I learnt how to see, from Hilton I learned how to feel and from Fuseli I learned how to fly"– Yankel Feather

== See also ==
- St. Ives School of Art
- Liverpool Academy of Arts
- Newlyn Society of Artists
