= Caroline Paige =

Transgender British military officer (born 1959)

- Born: 1959 (age 66–67); Wallasey, Wirral, England, UK
- Military career
- Allegiance: United Kingdom
- Branch: Royal Air Force
- Rank: Flight Lieutenant
- Conflicts: Gulf War

Flight Lieutenant Caroline Paige (born 1959) was the first transgender officer to serve openly in the UK Armed Forces. Before her transition in 1999, she served in the Cold War intercepting Soviet bomber planes, and was involved in the Gulf War and Bosnia conflict. She switched to Battlefield Helicopters in 1992 and flew several operational tours post-transition, including Bosnia, Iraq and Afghanistan, before her retirement from the military in November 2014.

== Military career ==
Paige joined the Royal Air Force (RAF) in 1980. After completing navigator training at RAF Finningley, she was posted to Phantom F4s in the Air Defence role at RAF Leuchars.

In 1998, Paige finally accepted that she needed to resolve her lifelong battle with her gender identity. After informing the RAF of her need to transition, she was accepted in service as a female officer. Eighteen months later, she was publicly 'outed' on the front page of the newspaper The Sun (10 August 2000). After a short tour at RAF Innsworth on the Recruiting Policy desk, working on the implementation of ethnic minority recruiting policy, she successfully agreed to her return to RAF Benson, to join No 28 (AC) Squadron ready for its reformation as the first squadron to receive the Merlin HC Mk3 Battlefield Helicopter.

Over a five-year period, her work was recognised with two Commander Joint Helicopter Command Commendations for 'Exceptional Service', with a third commendation from the commander-in-chief of the Royal Air Force in the Queen's New Year Honours List of 2012.

Paige served in the RAF for thirty-five years and remained flying in thirty-four of them. She completed seventeen operational tours.

== Transitioning gender in the military ==
Following her transition in early 1999, Paige was influential in promoting transgender equality and inclusion in the UK armed forces. Her 2000 public 'outing' by The Sun newspaper led to much criticism of the decision to allow her to remain in the military. Critics declared that transgender people would be a liability, especially if they were allowed to serve with front-line forces.

Paige determined to help make the military a more inclusive environment for those following in her footsteps. She became an equality and diversity adviser for the military in 2000, trained as a mentor, became a member of the RAF LGBT Forum and Proud2Serve support groups, and participated as a key note speaker at several military conferences and training events throughout the UK. Her role in the UK armed forces earned her a permanent-under-secretary, Ministry of Defence Peoples Award in 2011.

In 2014, Paige advised the Palm Center of San Francisco State University regarding a national commission offering implementation guidance seeking the inclusion of openly serving transgender personnel in the US military.

On 10 October 2014, she was interviewed on The World radio program.

On 13 October 2014, Paige joined former and active duty transgender military personnel from other nations as panel members at a conference held in Washington, D.C., co-sponsored by the American Civil Liberties Union and the Palm Center.

On 23 October 2014, she and a fellow panel member, former US Navy Petty Officer Landon Wilson, co-authored an op-ed piece for CNN, discussing how both were deployed to Afghanistan, and both received commendations for that service, but Wilson's promotion and commendation were accompanied by discharge papers for being transgender.

Paige has worked with the charity Stonewall's School Role Models Programme, where she contributes her story to support, educate and inspire people, and to illustrate the positive values of respect, diversity and inclusion.
