= Oxford Friend =

LGBTQ+ charity

- Founded: 1980
- Headquarters: Oxford, Oxfordshire, England, United Kingdom
- Website: OxfordFriend.co.uk

Oxford Friend was an Oxford-based LGBTQ+ charity that offered emotional support and counseling to the lesbian, gay, bisexual, and transgender community in Oxford and Oxfordshire. The original volunteers were affiliated with the local branch of the Campaign for Homosexual Equality (CHE). Listening services were provided through telephone, email, Facebook, and instant messaging. The charity also offered training on LGBTQ+ issues for educational institutions and other organizations in and around Oxfordshire. Oxford Friend raised funds through a grant from Oxford City Council (as part of their campaign to support the local LGBTQ+ community), donations, and external training packages.

The group was established in 1980 and registered as a charity in 1988. In 2006, the group was honored with the Queen's Award for Voluntary Service. Oxford Friend officially closed on 31 March 2020.

== See also ==
- Facebook page
- Twitter page
- Website
- Brighton Gay and Lesbian Switchboard
- Gay & Lesbian Switchboard of New York
- London Friend
- Switchboard (UK)
