= Sandall =

Sandall may refer to:

Surname

- Jane Sandall, midwifery and women's health academic
- John Sandall, Gascon medieval Lord High Treasurer, Lord Chancellor and Bishop of Winchester
- Robert Sandall (1952–2010), British musician, music journalist and radio presenter
- Roger Sandall (1933–2012), essayist and commentator on cultural relativism, author of The Culture Cult
- Scott Sandall, American politician and a Republican member of the Utah House of Representatives

Places

- Sandall Park, park in Doncaster, South Yorkshire, England
- Kirk Sandall, suburb of northeastern Doncaster in South Yorkshire, England

== See also ==
- Sandal
- Sandl
