= Worthing Pride =

Annual LGBT event in Worthing, England

- Date: 5–6 July 2024
- Frequency: Annually, in July
- Locations: Worthing, England
- Inaugurated: 2018
- Participants: 25,000 (2019)

Worthing Pride is an annual LGBTQ+ Pride celebration held in the town of Worthing, West Sussex, England.

== Background ==
The event began in 2018. It raises money for local charities. Worthing Pride 2022 raised money for LGBTQ Switchboard, a charity providing support to LGBTQ people across Sussex.

The 2018 and 2019 parades began at the Burlington Hotel in West Worthing, moving into the town centre along the town's promenade, past Worthing Pier to the Beach House grounds near Splashpoint Leisure Centre. Crowds of around 25,000 attended the 2019 celebrations including the parade, with 5,000 tickets sold for the main event in Beach House grounds.

Due to the COVID-19 pandemic, the event was cancelled in 2020. The main event returned to the grounds of Beach House in 2021, however the Pride Parade along the seafront was cancelled due to COVID-19 restrictions.

The full event returned in 2022, being held at Steyne Gardens for the first time. Between 2022 and 2025, the event is expected to generate over £1 million in revenue for the local economy, raising significant money for local LGBTQi charities.

== See also ==
- Brighton Pride
