= London Friend =

British LGBTQ charity

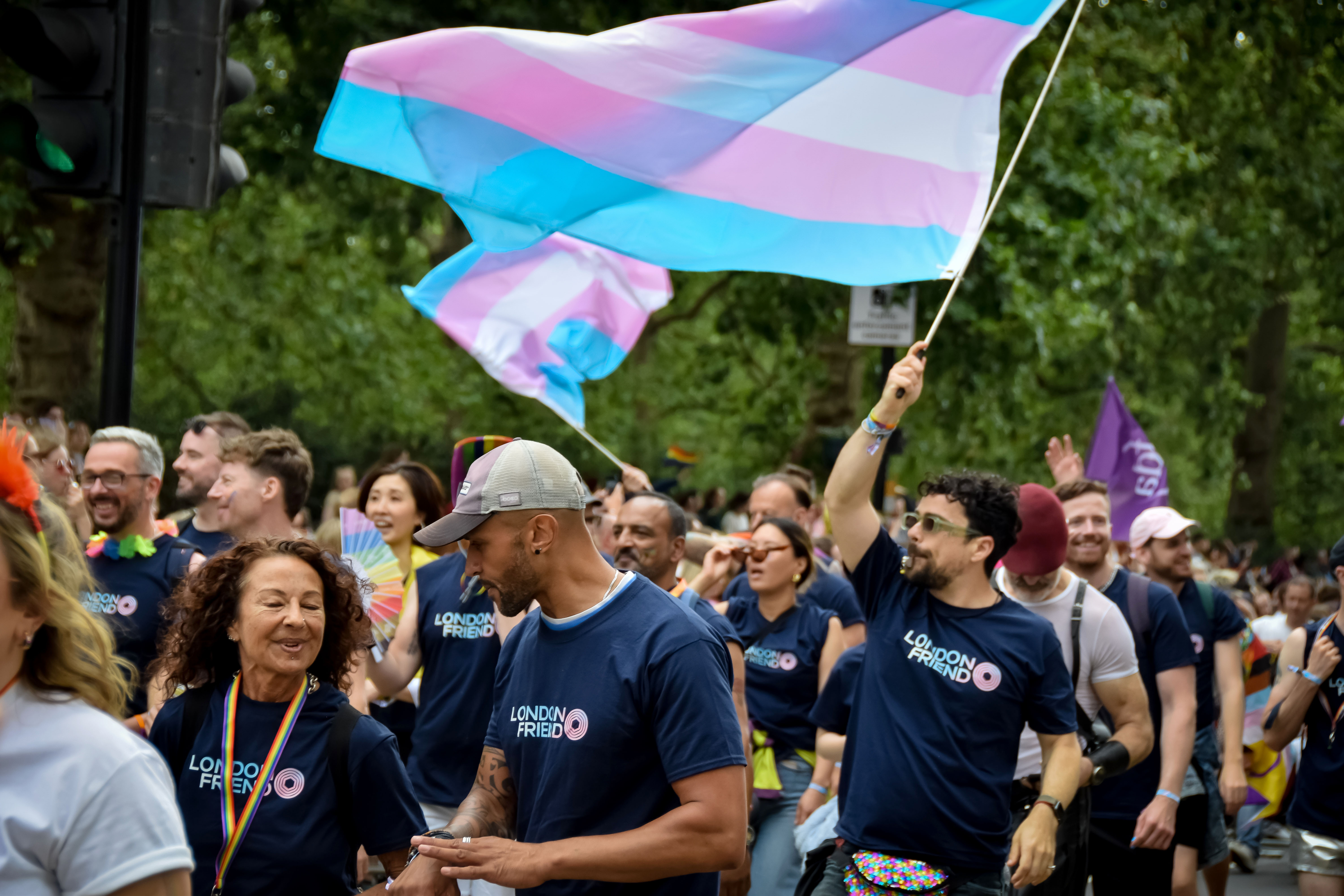
London Friend at Pride in London 2023

London Friend a British LGBT charity supporting the health and mental well-being of the LGBT community in and around London and South East England.

== History ==
London Friend was originally a part of Friend which was a befriending offshoot of the Campaign for Homosexual Equality (CHE) and first operated from a flat in Earl's Court, before moving to a community centre in Church Street, Westminster.

In 1974 London Friend appeared alongside CHE in a documentary titled 'Speak for yourself' produced by London weekend Television at which time the organisations offices were in at 47 Church St, London NW8. The organisations were working closely together through social events, Friend was a counselling service, whereas CHE was a campaign and political group[. London Friend was separated from CHE in 1975 and then obtained premises in Upper Street, temporarily in Seven Sisters Road, and later in Caledonian Road. The Caledonian Road premises were reported by January 2011 to be under threat and an appeal was launched to safeguard the building. During 2012, as a result of the appeal, and also additional funding following a merger with another charity, London Friend was able to purchase the property. Meanwhile continued expansion has meant that additional space is now being used at the GMFA office elsewhere in Islington.

== Provisions ==
London Friend has at various times provided befriending, counselling, meeting spaces, helplines, support groups, a library of gay and lesbian books, and training for volunteers, police cadets and social workers.

== Charity single ==
In 2011 British electronic singer Andi Fraggs recorded a charity single "Reality" for London Friend, followed by a fundraising show at Madame Jojo's in London's Soho.

== Awards ==
- Queen's Award for Voluntary Service 2016
- GSK IMPACT Award 2016
- National Diversity Awards 2014

== Official website ==
Official website

== See also ==
- Brighton & Hove LGBT Switchboard
- Gay & Lesbian Switchboard of New York
- Gay Liberation Front
- Switchboard (UK)
