= Andy's Man Club =

Mutual aid fellowship

- Andy's Man Club Limited
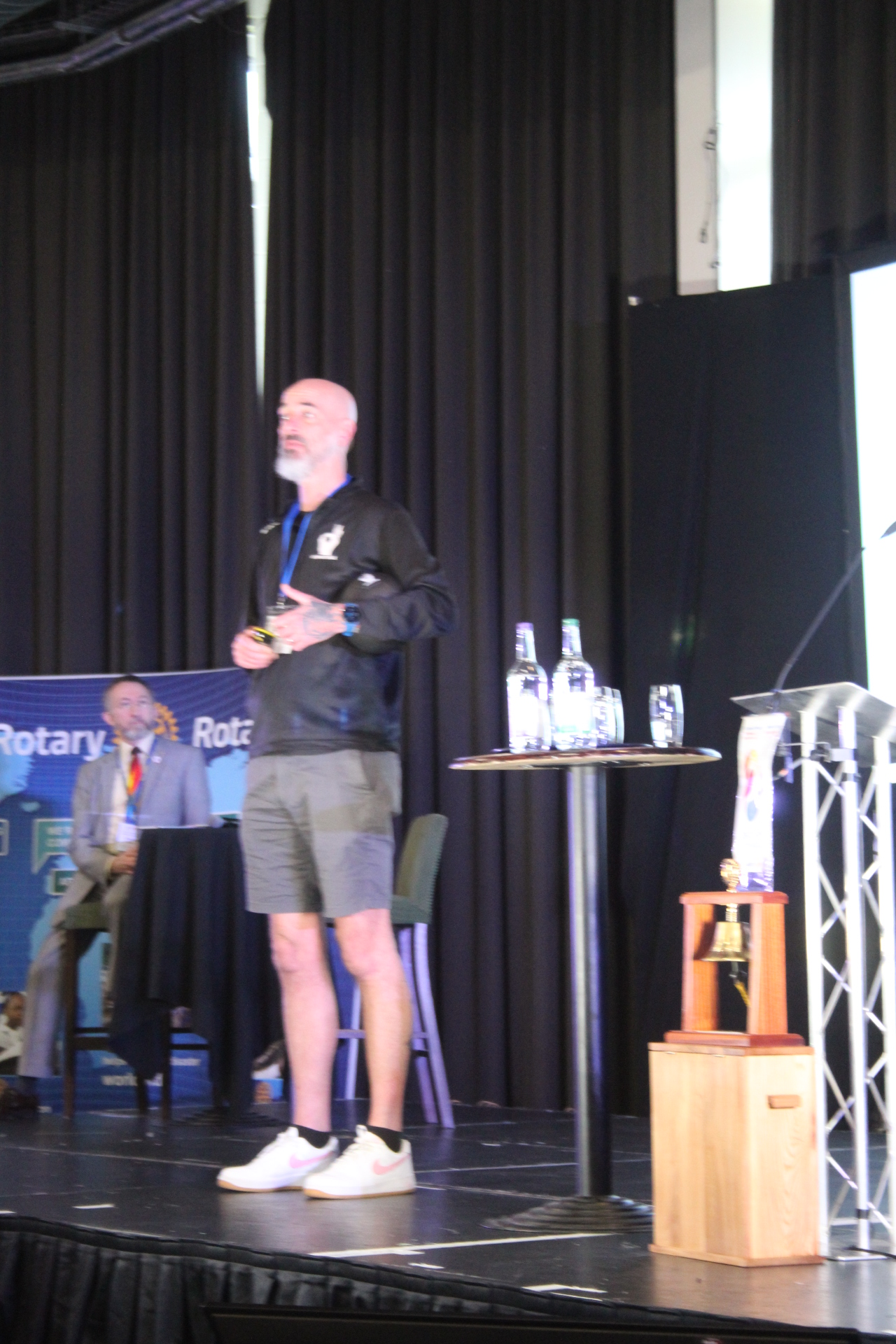
- Presentation at Scottish Rotary conference in 2024 by Alex McLintock
- Abbreviation: AMC
- Named after: Andy Roberts
- Formation: 2016; 10 years ago
- Founder: Luke Ambler; Elaine Roberts
- Founded at: Halifax
- Type: Limited Charitable Company
- Purpose: Male mental health
- Headquarters: Halifax
- Website: andysmanclub.co.uk

Andy's Man Club is a UK charitable organisation that coordinates weekly peer-to-peer support groups for men in the UK. It aims to help and improve mental health in men through self-help peer-to-peer interaction. The charity organises weekly 2-hour group talking sessions at over 320 venues across the UK mainland, led by a trained group member known as a facilitator.

== History ==
It was formed in 2016 by Luke Ambler and his mother-in-law Elaine after his brother-in-law Andy died by suicide. This led them to discover that suicide is the leading cause of death in men under 50 years old in the UK and that in this demographic there is a cultural stigma towards discussing mental health. The first meeting, held in Halifax, was attended by nine men. The charity has since set up groups in towns and cities across the UK mainland and by February 2020 had over 800 men attending every week.

In 2021, it earned the Queen's Award for Voluntary Service.

In March 2024, Andy's Man Club meetings were attended by over 4,500 men across the country; 10% these were new to the meeting. As of February 2025 this had risen to over 270 groups attended by 5,800 men.

== Focus ==
The charity's slogan is "it's okay to talk" and describes itself as "A bunch of blokes having a chat over a brew and biscuit". There are over 300 groups across the UK that meet each Monday from 19:00 to 21:00. Each group meeting is led by a volunteer 'group facilitator', who has been trained by the organisation to facilitate each meeting. Upon entry to a group session, free drinks and biscuits are offered to the attendees. The group meeting is arranged around five questions, with each attendee invited, but not obliged, to answer each question in turn before repeating the process for the next question. Often passing a branded ball between members to encourage them to talk and give focus to the attendee. The first three questions are always the same: "How has your week been?", "Name something positive from your week?" and "Anything to get off your chest?" followed by two questions that vary each week and are intended to promote positive discussion.

== Locations ==
There are over 320 locations in the UK that have a regular Andy's Man Club meeting: Some locations have multiple groups - Manchester has 5 groups within the city itself, and another 11 in the outer suburbs.

- Aberdeen
- Abergavenny
- Ainley Top
- Alton
- Altrincham
- Arbroath
- Armadale
- Ashton-Under-Lyne
- Ayr
- Barnet
- Barnsley
- Barnsley North
- Barrow-in-Furness
- Basildon
- Bathgate
- Batley
- Berwick-Upon-Tweed
- Beverley
- Blackburn
- Blackpool
- Bolton
- Bournemouth
- Bradford central
- Bradford south
- Bridlington
- Brighouse
- Bristol north
- Bristol south
- Broxburn
- Burnley
- Bury North
- Bury South
- Cambridge
- Carlisle
- Castleford
- Caterham
- Chelmsford
- Chesterfield
- Chorley
- Cleckheaton
- Cockermouth
- Corby
- Cowdenbeath
- Crosby
- Cupar
- Deeside
- Dewsbury
- Doncaster Armthorpe
- Doncaster Central
- Doncaster Stainforth
- Dunbar
- Dundee East
- Dundee West
- Dunfermline North
- Dunfermline South
- Eastleigh
- Edinburgh Merchiston
- Edinburgh South Gyle
- Exeter city
- Exeter Wonford
- Eyemouth
- Fareham
- Featherstone
- Forfar
- Galashiels
- Gateshead
- Glasgow
- Glasgow Kelvin Hall
- Gleneagles
- Glenrothes North
- Glenrothes South
- Goole
- Gosport
- Grimsby
- Grimsby Albion Street
- Grimsby East Marsh
- Guildford
- Halifax Central
- Halifax North
- Harrogate
- Hartlepool
- Hebden Bridge
- Hemsworth
- Holmfirth
- Honiton
- Horden
- Huddersfield
- Hull Airco
- Hull Humber
- Hull Kingston Rovers
- Hull Sirius Academy West
- Hull University of Hull
- Immingham
- Inverkeithing
- Keighley
- Kelty
- Kinross
- Kilmarnock
- Kilsyth
- Kirkcaldy
- Leeds Bramley
- Leeds College of Building
- Leeds Milford
- Leeds Pudsey
- Leeds Seacroft
- Leeds South
- Lichfield
- Littlehampton
- Liverpool
- London Euston
- Manchester
- Manvers
- Maryport
- Mirfield
- Merthyr Tydfil
- Methil
- Mold
- Newcastle-upon-Tyne
- Newton Abbot
- Oldham
- Paignton
- Perth
- Peterborough
- Plymouth
- Plymouth Marjon
- Pontypridd
- Porthcawl
- Portsmouth
- Preston North
- Preston South
- Rhondda
- Rochdale
- Romford
- Rosyth
- Rotherham
- Scarborough
- Scarborough Eastfield
- Selby
- Sheffield Central
- Sheffield North (Hillsborough Park)
- Sheffield South (Beighton)
- Southampton
- Southport
- Southend-on-Sea
- Stafford
- St. Andrews
- Sunderland
- Tadcaster
- Teignmouth
- Torquay
- Wakefield
- Warrington
- Washington
- Whitehaven
- Wigan
- Workington
- Woking
- Wolverhampton
- Wrexham
- York

== Similar organisations ==
Other similar organisations such as ManKind and In Sam's name have come to exist, some with a local focus and others with a national.

== See also ==
- Men's health
- Mental disorders and gender
- Mental health in the United Kingdom
