= Chinese community in London =

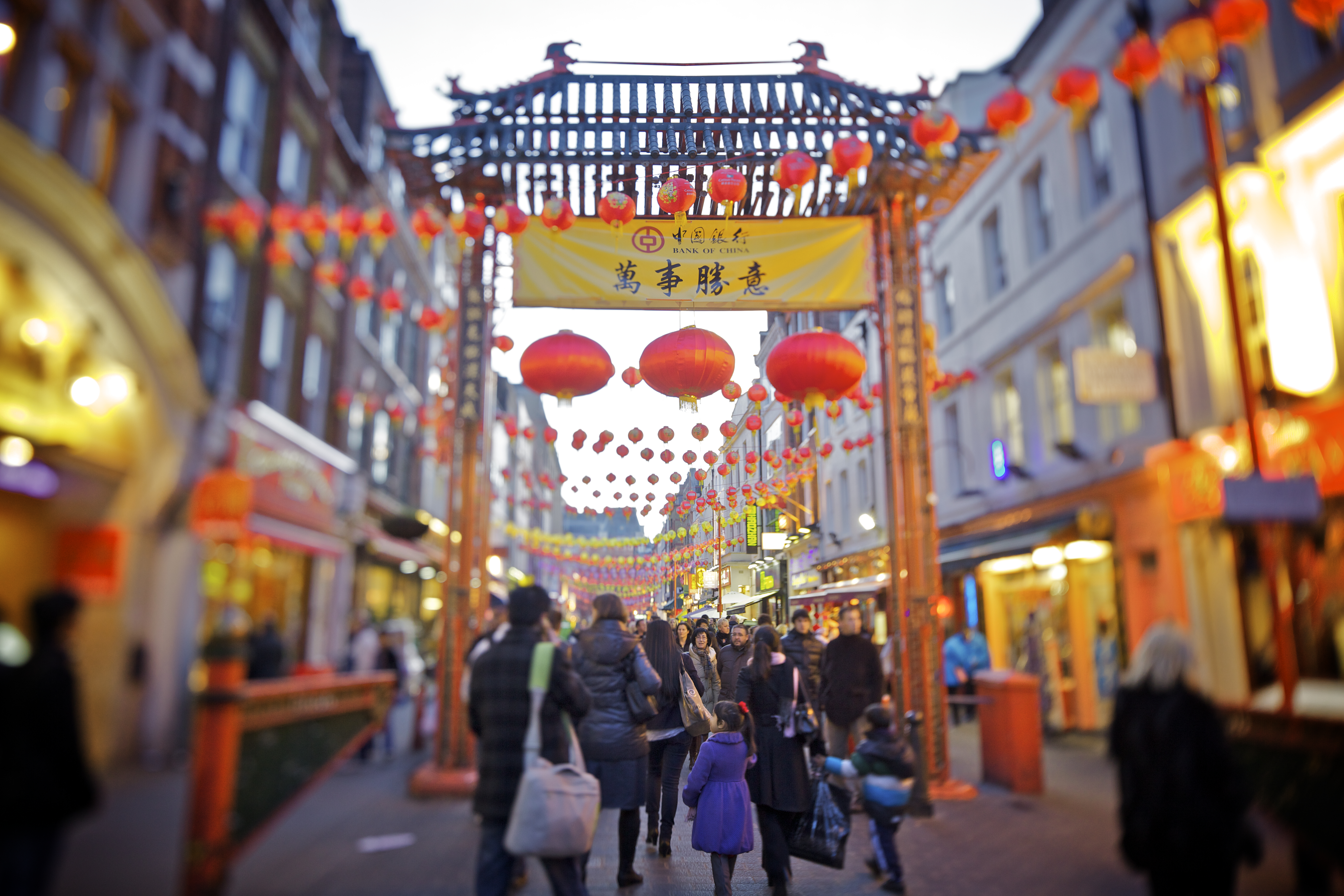
Chinatown, London

There are 120,250 Chinese people in London, comprising 1.5% of the city's population. 33% of ethnic Chinese people in the United Kingdom reside in London.

As of 2000, more recent ethnic Chinese arrivals originated from mainland China, Taiwan, and Vietnam while historically Chinese had migrated from Hong Kong, including the urbanised areas and the New Territories; Singapore; Malaysia; and elsewhere in southeast Asia.

== History ==
According to John Eade, a Chinese community representative stated that in the 1780s Chinese sailors visited London, making them the first Chinese to do so. In the latter half of the 1800s the first wave of Chinese immigrants came to London. Chinese lived in Soho by the time World War II occurred.

Since Hong Kong was a British territory, many Chinese immigrants from Hong Kong as well as Macau (which were, and still are, very similar in terms of economy and geography) were either brought over or travelled to London and subsequently the rest of the U.K. Another wave of Chinese immigration occurred in London during the 1950s and 1960s. The London economy prompted Chinese from many places to move, while changes in international rice markets prompted some Chinese from the New Territories of Hong Kong to move to London. During the same era, many Chinese moved from Whitehall to Soho.

In the 1970s and 1980s many Chinese working in Soho continued to work there but began moving to suburbs. Non-Chinese began replacing the Chinese in Soho in the 1980s. As of the late 1980s Soho remained the centre of the London Chinese community. The Chinese were not involved in the development of the Soho LGBT community.

== Demographics ==
Proportion stating their ethnic group was Chinese in the 2011 census in Greater London.

According to the 2011 census, Greater London included 124,250 British Chinese, making up 1.5% of the overall population. The borough of Barnet had the highest population with a Chinese ethnic group followed by Tower Hamlets and Southwark, with Camden ranking second by local proportion.

London demography (2011 census)
Borough	Population	Percentage
City of London (not a London Borough)	263	3.4%
Barking and Dagenham	1,315	0.5%
Barnet	8,259	2.3%
Bexley	2,514	1.2%
Brent	3,250	1.2%
Bromley	2,768	1.1%
Camden	6,493	2.9%
Croydon	3,925	0.9%
Ealing	4,132	1.2%
Enfield	2,588	0.8%
Greenwich	5,938	2.8%
Hackney	3,447	0.9%
Hammersmith and Fulham	3,140	1.8%
Haringey	3,744	1.5%
Harrow	2,629	1.2%
Havering	1,459	0.9%
Hillingdon	2,889	1.0%
Hounslow	2,405	1.0%
Islington	4,457	2.1%
Kensington and Chelsea	3,968	2.6%
Kingston upon Thames	2,883	1.8%
Lambeth	4,573	1.5%
Lewisham	6,164	2.8%
Merton	2,618	2.3%
Newham	3,930	1.1%
Redbridge	3,000	1.5%
Richmond upon Thames	1,753	1.5%
Southwark	8,074	2.8%
Sutton	2,240	1.3%
Tower Hamlets	8,109	3.2%
Waltham Forest	2,579	1.0%
Wandsworth	3,715	1.2%
Westminster	5,917	3.3%

The report London's Population and the 2011 Census: First Report Session 2009-10, Report, Together with Formal Minutes and Oral and Written Evidence stated that among recent migrants from China "many work long hours in the unregulated sector and many are entirely, and consensually, disenfranchised from public life in London." Few of the Chinese migrants had formal leases or ownership of property. At the time, there were low levels of English literacy among the migrants.

John Eade, author of Placing London: From Imperial Capital to Global City, wrote that "Chinatown remained one of the most important symbolic centres of community for Chinese across Britain."

According to Paul Barker of the Institute of Community Studies, as of 1998, no part of London had a marked concentration of ethnic Chinese residents.

== Institutions ==
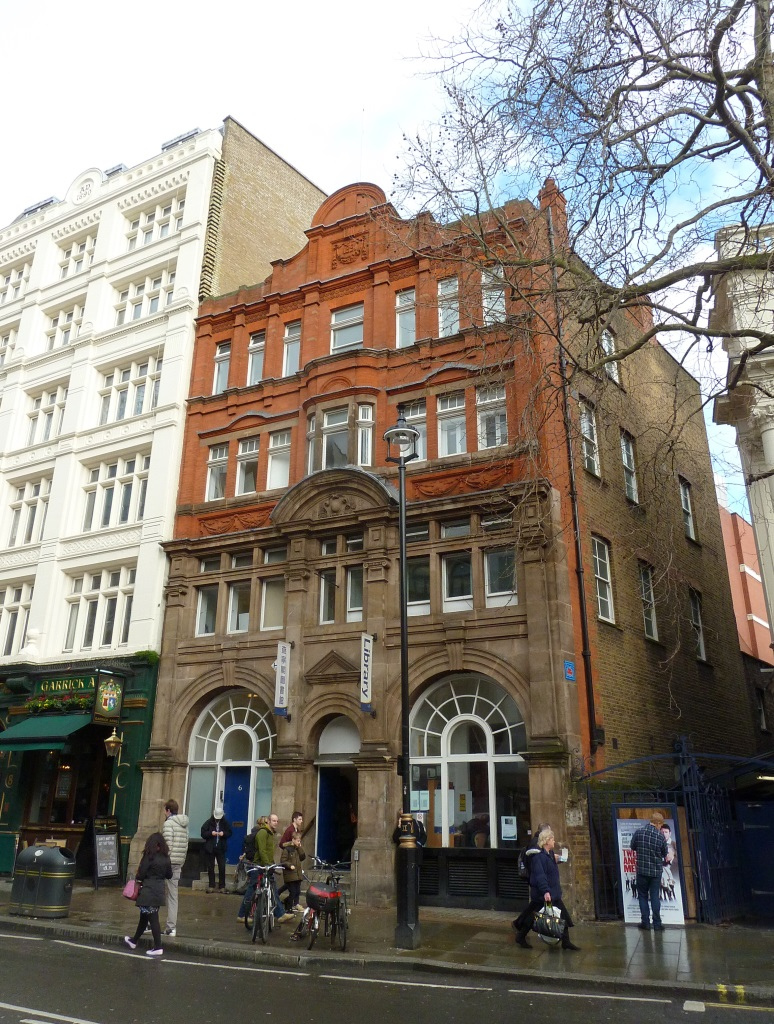
Charing Cross Library

There are Chinese community centres in Chinatown, Barnet, Camden, Greenwich, Lewisham, Kensington, Westminster and Tower Hamlets. Major organisations include the London Chinese Community Centre, London Chinatown Chinese Association, Islington Chinese Association, Kingston Chinese Association and the London Chinese Cultural Centre.

The Ming-Ai (London) Institute focuses on better integrating the London's Chinese community with the wider London community. This is achieved by providing opportunities for British people to learn more about Chinese culture and raising awareness to issues which affecting Overseas Chinese.

The Islington Chinese Association (ICA) is present in London.

== Education ==
The Westminster Chinese Library, based at the Charing Cross Library (traditional Chinese: 查寧閣圖書館; simplified Chinese: 查宁阁图书馆; pinyin: Chánínggé Túshūguǎn), holds one of the largest collections of Chinese materials in UK public libraries. It has a collection of over 50,000 Chinese books available for loan and reference to local readers of Chinese; music cassettes, CDs, and video films for loan; community information and general enquiries; a national subscription service of Chinese books; and Chinese events organised from time to time. The library also hosted a photography exhibition in 2013 as part of the British Chinese Heritage project, with photographs and stories of Chinese workers.

== Recreation ==
The London Dragon Boat Festival is held annually in June at the London Regatta Centre, Royal Albert Docks. It is organised by the London Chinatown Lions Club.

== Politics ==
The Chinese for Labour Group (renamed "East and Southeast Asians for Labour") was formed in 1999 to represent the interests of Chinese people in the Labour Party and improve the quality of life of Chinese communities in Britain. Its current chair is Sarah Owen, it was co-founded and formerly chaired by Sonny Leong, and it lists SOAS University of London professor Stephen Chan as an extraordinary ambassador.

Conservative Friends of the Chinese is chaired by Geoffrey Clifton-Brown MP (Parliamentary Chairman) and Lord Wei of Shoreditch (Nat Wei).
