= Pride in Liverpool =

Annual LGBT event in Liverpool, England

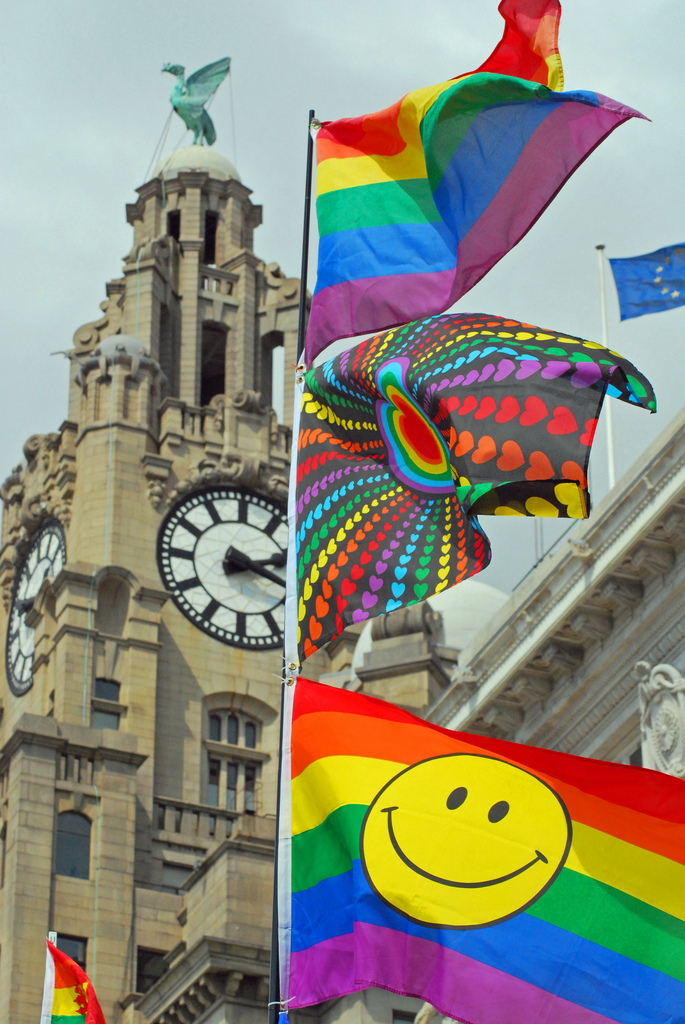
- Liverpool Pride 2011 at the Pier Head
- Frequency: Annually in July/August
- Location: Liverpool City Centre including the Pride Quarter
- Years active: 17
- Inaugurated: 2010
- Participants: 75,000 (Overall festival); 20,000 (March with Pride)
- Website: prideinliverpool.co.uk

Pride in Liverpool (formerly Liverpool Pride), is an annual festival of LGBT culture which takes place across various locations in Liverpool City Centre including the gay quarter. Audience numbers reach up to 75,000 people, making it one of the largest free Gay Pride festivals in Europe.

The event is always held on the closest weekend to 2 August, in commemoration of the death of Michael Causer, the young gay man who was murdered in the city in 2008.

Pride in Liverpool usually features a parade and march which sets off on the Saturday at St George's Hall, winding its way through the city centre and ending up at the main site of the festival. The parade itself attracts over 20,000 participants which excludes the spectators who observe along the route. Also included is a large open air festival featuring a number of stages, street stalls and street entertainment. More relaxed events usually follow on the Sunday which often include sports, arts and cultural events across the city.

Pride in Liverpool is organised by the LCR Pride Foundation, which champions the rights of LGBT people across the six districts of Halton, Knowsley, City of Liverpool, Sefton, St Helens and Wirral.

== Organisation ==
Pride in Liverpool was organised by the LCR Pride Foundation, a registered charity established in 2019. In 2025 the Foundation announced there would be no Pride Festival or march due to "financial and organisational challenges", in part as a result of their decision to end their partnership with Barclays.

On 1 July 2025, Sahir House announced a Pride event and celebrations would take place on 26 July 2025 and would be renamed 'Liverpool's Pride' 'because this pride belongs to all of us'. Sahir House is the city's oldest LGBTQ+ charity and the new Pride would be at a new venue with a new route.

== History ==
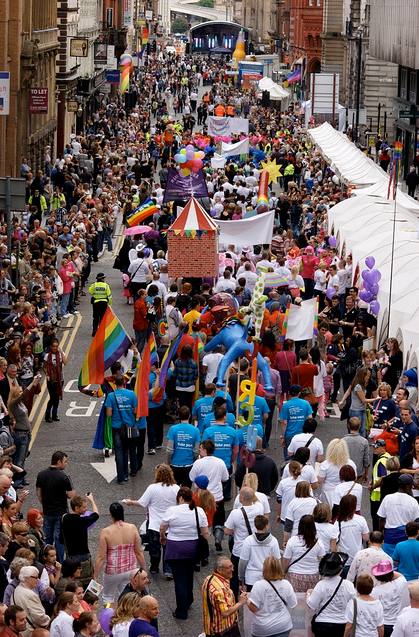
Looking down Dale Street towards main stage at Liverpool Pride 2010

Up until 2010, Liverpool was the largest British city to not hold a Pride and it took many years of campaigning to establish a stable and lasting celebration in the city. The campaign took a significant turning point in 2008 when the newly formed Liverpool LGBT Network voted that establishing a permanent Pride in the city would be one of its key priorities. At the height of Liverpool's year as European Capital of Culture, it was felt that staging a successful festival to rival those of other large UK cities was a realistic and attainable goal. Later in the year, the movement began to gather pace and was bolstered by a renewed sense of urgency and determination following the high-profile homophobic murder of Michael Causer on the outskirts of the city.

A motion in support of Liverpool Pride was approved by a full meeting of Liverpool City Council in 2009.

The first official Pride was successfully held in the gay quarter in 2010, centred on Dale Street and Stanley Street, however, in 2011 due to a funding shortfall the decision was taken to relocate the main focus of the festival to the city's Pier Head. Following this announcement, a public backlash ensued and sections of the local LGBT community planned to boycott the event. In response more than 30 businesses around Stanley Street organised a complementary festival to take place in the gay district alongside the main event.

Whilst Liverpool held its first "Official" Pride in 2010, it was not first ever in the city. Previous Prides have been held in 1979, 1990–1992, and in 1995.

== Past festivals ==
| Year | Dates | Theme | Location | Headliner(s) | Description |
|---|---|---|---|---|---|
| 2025 | Saturday 26 July | Liverpool's Pride | Pier Head, M&S Bank Arena, Liverpool Parish Church, Pride Quarter | Sugababes, local LGBTQ artists, activists, drag queens and organisations. | In Summer 2025, the LCR Pride Foundation ended its sponsorship partnership with Barclays. Following a recent UK Supreme Court ruling, Pride organisers condemned the bank's decision to prohibit transgender women from using female bathrooms in company buildings as contrary to the charity's objectives and ethos and a violation of transgender human rights. As a result, Pride's Board of Directors announced significant financial and organisational challenges and the cancellation of 2025's original festival plans. A last minute attempt to rescue the festival came with input from Sahir House, a Liverpool charity supporting people living with HIV. Fresh plans were announced to start the annual 'March with Pride' at the city's Pier Head for the first time to finish at the M&S Bank Arena where a ticketed event featuring cabaret and market stalls would take place. The theme 'Liverpool's Pride' was chosen as an expression of visibility and resilience. Sahir House organised the event over a period of seven weeks, meanwhile the LCR Pride Foundation committed to working with new sponsors and Liverpool City Council to secure the future of the festival. A vigil to remember LGBT individuals lost to violence, illness, social isolation, discrimination and exclusion was held at Liverpool Parish Church. |
| 2024 | Friday 26 July Saturday 27 July Sunday 28 July | Be Heard | Pier Head, Royal Albert Dock, Pride Quarter | Katrina and the Waves, Jake Shears, Kelly Llorenna, Lolly, Urban Cookie Collective, Danny Beard, Kelly Wilde and more. The Cheeky Girls performed in the Pride Quarter. | LCR Pride Foundation held what they called the 'biggest Pride event the city had ever seen'. Several stages hosted acts across the Pier Head and Royal Albert Dock. Over 12 LGBT venues held festivities in the city's Pride Quarter. A first of its kind open air orchestra concert known as 'Pride Classical' kickstarted the events at Pier Head fronted by Jake Shears, Danny Beard, several pop stars, West End theatre performers and a 32 piece orchestra. Markets, family activities and pop up events featuring artists from the local LGBT community were held across the city centre including the Royal Albert Dock. The British Firefighter Challenge, an annual sporting competition, came to Liverpool for the first time. The annual March with Pride broke all records in terms of the numbers participating. |
| 2023 | Saturday 29 July Sunday 30 July | Shout it Loud | Pier Head, Pride Quarter, Mann Island, Museum of Liverpool, Saint Nicholas Church Gardens, Liverpool One, Royal Albert Dock, Metquarter and St Johns Shopping Centre | Kerry Katona (Pride Quarter) Arthur Britney Joestar (Pier Head) | Pride in Liverpool 2023 adopted a new format compared to previous years. LCR Pride Foundation announced funding issues and lack of a major sponsor and confirmed that there would be no main stage or headline act. However, the festival went ahead with a number of pop-up events, curated zones, street parties, food vendors, chill out zones and areas suitable for children, which were spread across the City Centre. Organisers argued that the new format would allow the event to grow in the future. Continuing Liverpool's Eurovision 2023 legacy and solidarity with Ukraine, Liverpool's annual 'March with Pride' was held jointly with KyivPride on behalf of Ukraine's capital city Kyiv. Kyiv was unable to host their own event at home due to the ongoing Russian invasion. As a result of the combined efforts and attendance from Ukrainian delegates and community members from across the UK and Europe, an estimated 20,000 people participated in the march which set a new record for the festival. Street parties were held on Cumberland Street and Eberle Street in the Pride Quarter with performances hosted by The Masquerade Bar on a stage at Cumberland Street. Fringe events were organised by local businesses in the week running up to and during Pride including drag brunches, film and theatre performances, and a Mersey Ferry evening cruise on the River Mersey. |
| 2022 | Saturday 30 July Sunday 31 July | Come Together | Pier Head and Pride Quarter, Liverpool | Boney M. featuring Maizie Williams, Linda Gold's FunnyBoyz, Filla Crack, House of La Porta, Young Homotopia, Arthur Britney Joestar featuring Many Hands One Heart, performances on the main stage by local LGBT venues including OMG, The Lisbon and Superstar Boudoir. | Due to planned roadworks on Tithebarn Street, the festival site was moved to Liverpool's waterfront at the Pier Head. The annual Pride march, which attracted over 12,000 people, was also altered to follow a route to the Pier Head. Irish pop star Samantha Mumba was due to headline at the main stage but due to difficulty travelling from the United States was not able to perform. The main stage was programmed by Sound City and was hosted throughout the day by Jordan Lee from Radio City (Liverpool) and Hits Radio Pride as well as Jay Hynd from The Guide Liverpool. Film with Pride Cinema Lorry was also held which showed LGBT films including The Adventures of Priscilla, Queen of the Desert, Hedwig and the Angry Inch and Cabaret. |
| 2021 | Saturday 31 July Sunday 1 August | From Now On | Online and Indoor at Pride Quarter, Liverpool | Speeches from local leaders and short interviews were held online. The 13 LGBT venues in Liverpool's gay quarter also held an indoor festival. | The street festivities at Pride in Liverpool 2021 were originally planned to go ahead as normal, however, on 15 March 2021, LCR Pride Foundation announced that the physical events (including the annual March with Pride) would be cancelled for a second consecutive year. The Foundation cited the uncertainty and risks around mass public gatherings and COVID-19 and argued that there was no way to deliver a safe festival for over 50,000 people. Lewis Collins, Chair of the LCR Pride Foundation Board of Directors, said: "Our decision to cancel Pride in Liverpool and March with Pride for 2021 has not been taken lightly." An alternative virtual Pride march was held on the LCR Pride Foundation's social media channels. Individuals, groups and businesses were invited to submit videos and images of marching, cheering and holding placards in their own homes whilst making a pledge outlining actions and changes that they would take to highlight the inequalities and injustices that the LGBT community face. Speeches from local leaders and short interviews were also held. In addition, the LCR Pride Foundation worked in collaboration with Marketing Liverpool to launch the ‘Pride Quarter Indoor Festival' on 31 July. The festival intended to launch a new era for the city’s LGBT quarter exactly ten years after becoming the UK’s first formally recognised LGBT area. The festival included an official rebrand of Liverpool's Stanley Street gay quarter as the 'Pride Quarter' and an indoor festival took place in the district's 13 LGBT venues. A dedicated LGBT page on the Visit Liverpool website was also launched to advertise the Pride Quarter as a tourist destination and banners were put in place in the numerous streets around the area to mark the inauguration. On 18 September at 1pm in Liverpool city centre’s Derby Square, a transgender led collective of local LGBT activists held a protest titled 'Reclaim Pride Liverpool'. The protest demanded better LGBT rights, transgender healthcare and self-determination, a conversion therapy ban, social justice, racial justice and climate justice. The event was not connected to the official Pride in Liverpool festival but was intended as a visible street protest to the commercialisation, corporate sponsorship and funding of Liverpool Pride. It was held in the wake of a surge of homophobic and transphobic violence which had taken place in Liverpool over the recent months. The event gained support from former Labour leader Jeremy Corbyn. |
| 2020 | Saturday 25 July Sunday 26 July | Young at Heart | Online | Jurgen Klopp, Metro Mayor of the Liverpool City Region, Leon Lopez | Physical events were cancelled due to lockdowns and restrictions associated with the COVID-19 pandemic including social distancing and cancellation of mass participation events. Events were moved to digital only. The physical Pride march was replaced with an 'online march' broadcast from the LCR Pride Foundation's social media pages. The online march consisted of video submissions from individuals and organisations across the Liverpool City Region, well wishes and celebratory messages from public figures including Liverpool Football Club manager Jurgen Klopp and Steve Rotheram, the Metro Mayor of the Liverpool City Region. The theme 'Young at Heart' highlighted the physical and mental benefits of self care and being active. The online programme featured a range of themes from virtual interviews with LGBT+ champions and allies, question and answer sessions, inclusive sport, mental health, activism and LGBT+ youth support, film and music. |
| 2019 | Saturday 27 July Sunday 28 July | Come as You Are | Tithebarn Street and Pride Quarter, Liverpool | Little Boots, Saara Aalto, The Vivienne, Queen Zee | Liverpool Pride was rebranded as 'Pride in Liverpool'. It became the first festival to be delivered by the newly established Pride Foundation. The theme 'Come as You Are' was in commemoration of the 50th anniversary of the Stonewall riots. Several stages were held with the main features of the festival being live entertainment, a dedicated youth zone, community expo, market stalls, food and drink vendors. |
| 2018 | Saturday 28 July Sunday 29 July | All Together Now | Tithebarn Street and Pride Quarter, Liverpool | Sophie Ellis-Bextor, Katy B, Courtney Act, Cast from Kinky Boots the musical | The theme 'All Together Now' was a nod to 'Altogether Now', the number one song by the Liverpool band The Farm. It was also intended to celebrate every branch of the LGBTQ+ community coming together regardless of ethnicity, gender, sexuality or belief. The main events were held across three stages around a new larger site on Tithebarn Street. Various exhibitions and workshops were also held across the city's galleries. For the first time ever, Liverpool City Council staff took part in the Pride march. |
| 2017 | Saturday 29 July Sunday 30 July | International Love | Cultural Quarter surrounding St George's Hall & St John's Gardens and Pride Quarter, Liverpool | Atomic Kitten, Kym Mazelle, Marcus Collins, Livin' Joy, Austin Armacost | The theme 'International Love' marked the 50th anniversary of the decriminalisation of male homosexuality in England. Three stages were held: The main stage was sponsored by Barclays and the World On One Stage was sponsored by Manchester Airport. Marc Almond was originally due to perform, but due to TV and radio commitments surrounding the 50th anniversary of decriminalisation, he was forced to cancel. However, he did hold an exhibition at The Gallery on Stanhope Street. |
| 2016 | Saturday 30 July Sunday 31 July | Liverpool Icons | Cultural Quarter surrounding St George's Hall & St John's Gardens and Pride Quarter, Liverpool | Sonia, The Vivienne, Various groups and choirs and a range of X-Factor stars | The theme 'Liverpool Icons' was chosen as a tribute to the first anniversary of the death of Cilla Black, a notable 'Liverpool icon'. The celebrations included live music and entertainment, food, drink, community and education zones, a market place, family activities and speakers. There was also a dedicated Youth Zone with events for under 25s. Liverpool Pride teamed up with Orb Events, the organisers of the very first Pride in 2010, and a new identity, logo and website was launched. |
| 2015 | Saturday 1 August Sunday 2 August | Love is No Crime | Cultural Quarter surrounding St George's Hall & St John's Gardens and Pride Quarter, Liverpool | Local drag acts, guest speakers, musicians and entertainers | The theme 'Love is No Crime' paid respect to those countries where being LGBT was still illegal. Festivalgoers were encouraged to go along dressed in their most 'wild' and 'wonderful' interpretations of the theme. Due to financial constraints, the events were downsized and unlike previous years, The Pier Head was not used as the primary festival site. There were also no road closures or outdoor alcohol drinking zones. Smaller events were held at the city's gay quarter and around St George's Hall including markets, education and community zones, workshops, guest speakers, acoustic music, entertainment, a mobile cinema, a family zone and fundraisers for the following year's Pride. |
| 2014 | Saturday 2 August Sunday 3 August | Glam Fairy Tales | Pier Head and Pride Quarter, Liverpool | Katy B, Samantha Fox, Sonia, Heather Small, The cast of Wicked | In the theme of 'Glam Fairy Tales', participants were encouraged to dress as princes, princesses, white knights or fairy godmothers. The festival was held across three stages: The Waterfront Stage at the Pier Head, the Stanley Street Stage at the gay quarter and the Garlands/GBar Eberle Street Stage. The Pier Head was a ticketed event. |
| 2013 | Saturday 3 August Sunday 4 August | Superheroes | Pier Head and Pride Quarter, Liverpool | Kameelion, Black Lace, Baby D, Amelia Lily | The theme ‘Superheroes’ was voted for by 1,300 members of the public. The day began with a march through the streets of Liverpool City Centre by more than 6000 people, and continued with stages and entertainment at the Pier Head and Gay Quarter. Overall audience figures for the festival reached a record 75,000. |
| 2012 | Saturday 4 August Sunday 5 August | Nautical But Nice | Pier Head and Pride Quarter, Liverpool | Marcus Collins, 2 Shoes, Sarah Whatmore, Sam Clark, Liz McClarnon, Gaydio | Organisers described the event as the biggest, most ambitious and most diverse Prides ever developed in the city. Highlights included three stages across the Pier Head and gay quarter, an LGBT market, food and drink stalls, 2 for 1 tickets on Mersey Ferry cruises, open Zumba classes for all the family and a Health and Wellbeing zone. For the first time ever in the UK, two Premier League football clubs (Liverpool and Everton) were represented in a Pride March. On Sunday, the Big Gay Brunch at Tate Liverpool and Gay Gardens at Bluecoat Chambers were held. Other highlights were the Love Music Hate Homophobia event, the Liverpool Pride Film Festival and the Liverpool Pride arts and culture programme. Audience figures reached a record 52,000. |
| 2011 | Saturday 6 August Sunday 7 August | Summer of Love | Pier Head and Pride Quarter, Liverpool | Rowetta, Andi Fraggs, Britt Love, Kym Mazelle, Six D | The festival was spread across three stages, a football area, over 50 market stalls, a health and wellbeing area and food outlets at the Pier Head and gay quarter. It was attended by over 40,000 people. |
| 2010 | Saturday 7 August Sunday 8 August | Rainbow Circus | Pride Quarter, Liverpool | Natasha Hamilton, Rowetta with AJ Productions, Rozalla, Adam Rickitt, Carol Jiani, Hannah Trigwell, Ian McNabb | The festival featured three stages across Liverpool's gay quarter showcasing over 18 hours of music, dance, cabaret and performances. It was attended by 21,000 people and covered over 70 different acts. |

== Liverpool Lesbian & Gay Pride in the 1990s ==
After holding a one-off event in 1979, for many years the lesbian and gay community of Liverpool could not claim a home grown Pride of their own. The community instead opted to march annually in London in commemoration of the 1969 Stonewall uprisings.

However, between 1990 and 1992, various 'unofficial' community Pride festivals were held in the city thanks to an organised effort between the Liverpool Lesbian & Gay Action group, various arts bodies and local gay clubs.

'Liverpool Lesbian & Gay Pride', as it was known then, was not in any way connected nor indeed related to the contemporary Pride festival. The main differences being that Liverpool Pride is now officially sponsored by public authorities, has a legal structure and framework, is a weekend event as opposed to week-long, and does not include references to 'Lesbian' and 'Gay' in its title through fear of alienating transgender people. Moreover, Pride in the early 90s tended to concentrate more on arts, exhibitions, culture, talks, workshops and function evenings, in contrast to the party on the scene/popstar on stage format as seen today. The events of the 1990s also had a strong political element and aimed to explore and challenge society's attitudes towards sexuality at that time. To put it into perspective, gay men still faced an unequal age of consent, the infamous Section 28 was still in existence, there would be no partnership or adoption rights for same sex couples for at least another decade whilst OutRage!, a UK based LGBT activist group, was only in its infancy. Highlights of the festivals included discussions on women in the church, LGBT parenting and literature, support for gay and lesbian victims of sexual abuse and health awareness workshops. T-shirts and badges bearing the Pride logos were sold in local gay venues and at events themselves to help cover running costs (see brochure of events below).

The celebration took a brief break, but returned in 1995 under the new name 'Mersey Pride'. A more outdoor cabaret and stage type atmosphere was created around Pownall Square, which was chosen for its close proximity to The Brunswick and Time Out, two popular gay frequented pubs of the day. The occasion was modestly successful as a political statement and was attended by some 1200 revellers from across North West England, albeit attracting noticeable protests from the Christian right.

In many ways, Liverpool Lesbian & Gay Pride of the early 90s paved the way for Homotopia, the city's modern day gay arts festival launched some 12 years later, in the sense that Homotopia took on a similar formula. The Mersey Pride of 1995, however, bore a stronger resemblance to the present day festivities at Tithebarn Street and Gay Quarter in spite of being significantly smaller and much less mainstream.

Liverpool Lesbian & Gay Pride Brochure 1990

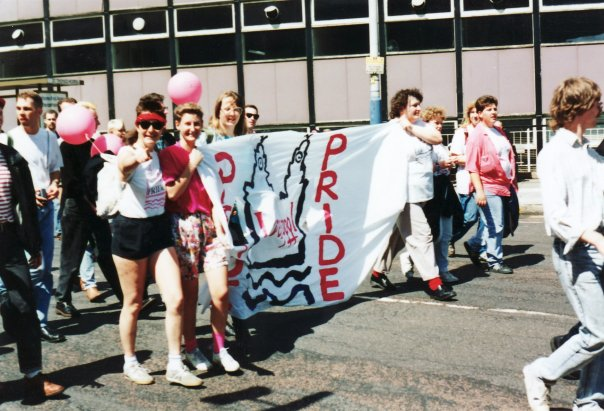
Liverpool goes to London Pride 1990

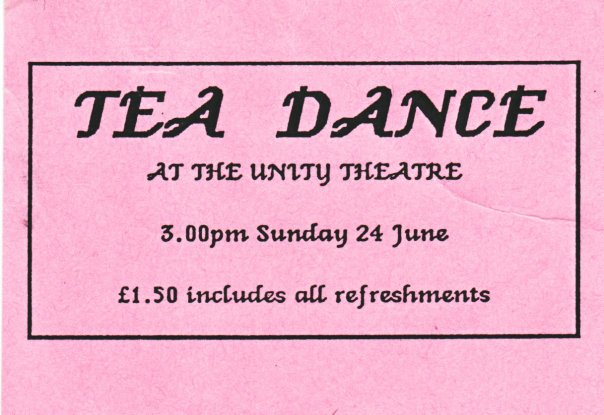
Tea Dance Ticket from Liverpool Lesbian & Gay Pride 1990

Liverpool Lesbian & Gay Pride Brochure 1991

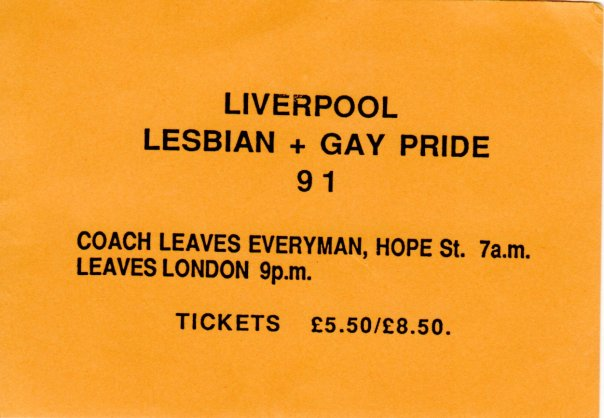
Coach ticket to London Pride 1991

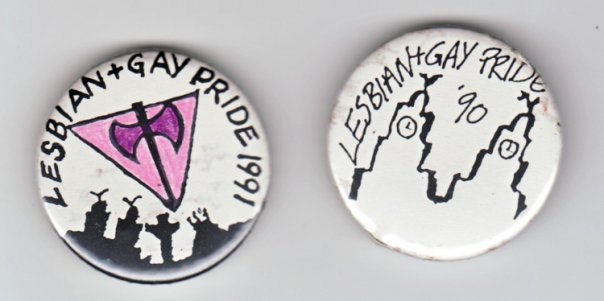
Badges from Liverpool Lesbian & Gay Pride 1990 & 1991

Liverpool Lesbian & Gay Pride Brochure 1992

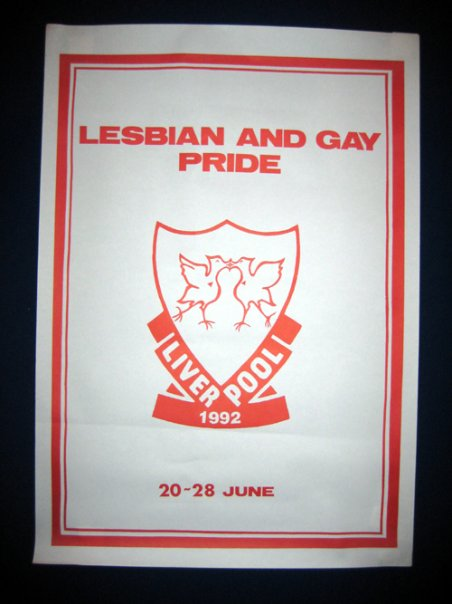
Liverpool Lesbian & Gay Pride 1992 Poster

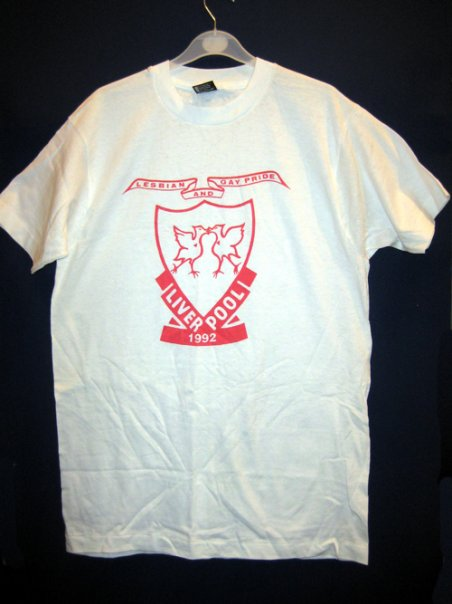
Liverpool Lesbian & Gay Pride 1992 T-shirt

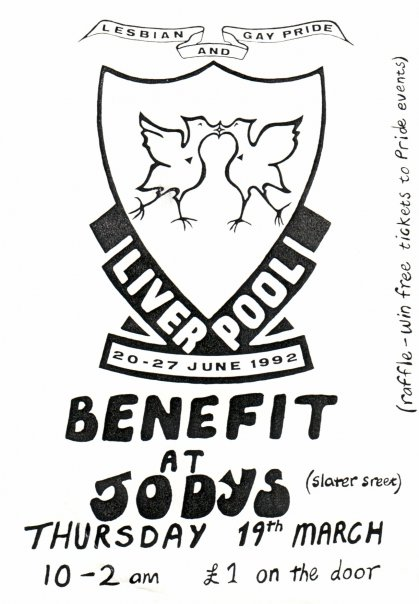
Benefit night at Jody's, Liverpool Lesbian & Gay Pride 1992

Liverpool Lesbian & Gay Pride 1992 tea dance programme

Liverpool Lesbian & Gay Pride 1995

== Liverpool Gay Pride 1979 ==
The first recorded Liverpool Pride commenced on 22 June 1979 and consisted of a week long celebration in remembrance of the New York Stonewall riots, which took place in the June some ten years earlier. The Liverpool event can legitimately claim to be one of the earliest known Prides to ever take place in the United Kingdom, the oldest being a march of 700 people through central London in 1972.
