= Andi Fraggs =

English musician (born 1986)

- Born: Andrew Fraggs Bennett; 7 April 1986 (age 40); Merseyside, England
- Genres: Electronic, synth-pop, pop
- Occupations: Singer-songwriter, music producer
- Years active: 2006–2017
- Label: Twenty20Sound

Andi Fraggs (born Andrew Fraggs Bennett; 7 April 1986 in Merseyside, England) is an English singer-songwriter and music producer. After contributing to musical projects featured on television and radio in the UK and the US, Andi released his first solo single in 2010. His debut album, Always First, followed in 2012 and included the popular single "Beautiful Feeling". Fraggs has performed at many notable venues and events around the UK, and supported such artists as Toyah Willcox, Hazel O'Connor, David Hoyle and Go West. In 2015, he took part in the national selections to represent Moldova at the Eurovision Song Contest with "One Song". His second album, Pure, was released in 2016.

== Career ==
Andi Fraggs grew up in North Wales and moved to London at the age of 20. He contributed vocals to Koolwah's 2007 single "Fashion" which was used in a promotion for Bacardi and appeared on the accompanying compilation. It was also featured on the HBO TV show Entourage, and has since been also featured in Channel 5's Fashionista Diaries, The Sunday Times's TV advert and ITV's Monaco Grand Prix coverage. Around that time, Fraggs worked on an album which was eventually shelved due to creative differences.

Andi's first solo single, the double A-side "Addiction"/"November", was released in November 2010 on his own label Twenty20Sound and reached number 1 on the Play.com pre-order dance chart. His next single, "The Way I Feel", was presented at the international Midem music festival in France and featured on the official companion compilation. In June 2011, Fraggs released "Reality", a charity single for the LGBT organisation London Friend, followed by a fundraising show at Soho's Madame Jojo's. He also performed at Pride festivals in London, Liverpool and Leicester. In autumn that year, he supported Toyah Willcox on her UK concert tour taking in major venues across the UK, such as Glasgow's Classic Grand and London's O2 Academy Islington, and opened for David Hoyle at the Royal Vauxhall Tavern. He released a new single, "Beautiful Feeling", remixed by Massimo Paramour, which went on to become one of the tracks of the year on Gaydar Radio.

Fraggs supported Toyah again during her spring 2012 dates, and self-released his debut album, Always First, in April 2012. In summer that year, the video for the track "If It's Wrong" went viral on YouTube, accumulating over 80,000 views in just one day. The singer performed at several Pride events, including Norwich and Leicester. In October, he embarked on the Only Love Tour, supporting both Toyah and Hazel O'Connor. In early 2013, Fraggs began publishing a series of features and interviews for an online magazine Polari, interviewing such well known cultural figures as Christina Crawford and Kate Pierson of The B-52's. In July, he performed to around 18,000 people in London's Trafalgar Square and Soho as part of London Pride. In late 2013, he supported the band Go West.

In February 2014, Andi Fraggs returned with a new single, "Visions", followed by the songs "Rain Comes Soon" and "Blue". They were to feature on a forthcoming album, also titled Visions, which eventually wouldn't be released. In December 2014, Andi's track "One Song" was shortlisted in the national selections to represent Moldova at the Eurovision Song Contest 2015. He stated that the song, co-written with Massimo Paramour, was created with the theme of building bridges between nations and the 60th anniversary of Eurovision in mind. To promote the song, Fraggs appeared on major television and radio channels in Moldova and Romania. The song received strong public support, with more online poll votes than any other entry, but the jury stated that they were looking for a more traditional entry for Moldova, and "One Song" was eliminated. Throughout 2015, the singer released videos for the new songs "I'll Still Be There" and "Once More (With Feeling)", and by that time performed under the simply Fraggs. He released the new single "Only the Moment" in January 2016, and his second album, Pure, was self-released in July 2016.

== Discography ==
=== Albums ===
Title	Album details
Always First	Released: 7 April 2012; Label: Twenty20Sound; Formats: CD, digital download
Pure	Released: 3 July 2016; Label: Twenty20Sound; Formats: digital download, streaming

=== Singles ===
Title	Year	Album
"Fashion" (Koolwah feat. Andi Fraggs)	2007	Minimal Digital
"Addiction"/"November"	2010	Always First
"The Way I Feel"/"Broken Promises"	2010	Always First
"Always First"/"Eroction"	2011	Always First
"Reality"	2011	Always First
"Beautiful Feeling"	2011	Always First
"If It's Wrong"	2012	Always First
"Visions"	2014	—N/a
"Rain Comes Soon"	2014	—N/a
"Only the Moment"	2016	Pure

=== Music videos ===
Title	Year	Album
"Addiction"	2010	Always First
"The Way I Feel"	2010	Always First
"November"	2010	Always First
"Always First"	2011	Always First
"Reality"	2011	Always First
"Beautiful Feeling"	2012	Always First
"If It's Wrong"	2012	Always First
"Visions"	2014	—N/a
"Rain Comes Soon"	2014	—N/a
"Blue"	2014	Pure
"One Song"	2014	Pure
"I'll Still Be There"	2015	Pure
"Once More (With Feeling)"	2015	Pure
"Only the Moment"	2016	Pure
"One More Night"	2016	Pure

== Tours ==
- 2011: From Sheep Farming to Anthem Tour (supporting Toyah Willcox)
- 2012: The Changeling Resurrection Tour (supporting Toyah Willcox)
- 2012: Only Love Tour (supporting Toyah Willcox and Hazel O'Connor)
