= Murder of Michael Causer =

2008 murder case in the United Kingdom

Michael Causer
- Born: 9 October 1989
- Died: 2 August 2008 (aged 18); Whiston, Merseyside, England, United Kingdom
- Cause of death: Beating
- Citizenship: United Kingdom
- Occupation: Hairdresser
- Known for: Homicide victim

Murder of Michael Causer
- Date: 25 July 2008
- Location: Liverpool, England
- Convicted: James O'Connor, Gavin Alker
- Verdict: O'Connor (guilty), Alker (acquitted)

Michael Causer (9 October 1989 – 2 August 2008) was a gay teenager living in Liverpool who came to national attention in the United Kingdom when he was seriously assaulted because of his sexual orientation in the early hours on the morning of 25 July 2008 after a small house party.

He later died in the Walton Centre for Neurology and Neurosurgery after undergoing extensive emergency surgery to his brain. He was 18 years old at the time of his death.

Causer's funeral was held on 2 October 2008 in a local church in Whiston where he lived.

Two teenage men, James O'Connor and Gavin Alker, were charged with the murder. Christopher Douglas was charged with witness intimidation in relation to the case.

== Criminal background ==
According to evidence put before the jury, the trigger-point for the violence came when Causer's attackers found sexually explicit images of him on his mobile phone as he slept upstairs in a house where a party had been held. This prompted a sustained and brutal attack as he slept leaving him with a fractured skull and a swollen brain.

It was alleged that Alker, who had never met Causer, screamed, "You little queer faggot" and "He’s a little queer, he deserves it". During the trial, it was also claimed that Alker used a cigarette lighter to burn the hair on Mr Causer's legs, and that threats were made to rip out his body piercings with a knife.

Alker pleaded not guilty, claiming he had acted in self-defence, and blaming the attack on O'Connor. Alker was acquitted of murder and manslaughter. James O'Connor was convicted and sentenced to serve life with a minimum of 11 1/2 years before he can be considered for parole after pleading guilty to murder. Michael Binsteed, who had initially called the emergency services but had lied about not knowing the attackers' identities, pleaded guilty to attempting to pervert the course of justice and was sentenced to 34 weeks in custody, suspended for two years.

A memorial fund was established, initially to support Causer's family with funeral and legal expenses. Due to the generosity of the response to this fund, it developed into the Michael Causer Foundation, whose aim is to provide supported accommodation for vulnerable LGBT young people in the north West of England. It became a UK registered charity in July 2011. The Liverpool Pride festival is held around the anniversary of his murder.
