= Zenith Youth Theatre Company =

English amateur theater company

Zenith Youth Theatre Company is an entirely voluntarily run amateur theater company based in Bath, England. It was founded in 1963 as Bodlets (the junior section to Bath Operatic and Dramatic Society), and changed to its current name in 2003. The company currently perform two musicals a year at the Kingswood Theatre, Lansdown, Bath. It is one of the longest running youth theatre companies in the United Kingdom, only eight years younger than the National Youth Theatre. In 2013 the company gained the Queen's Award for Voluntary Service.

== History ==
The amateur company was formed in May 1963. The company was first known as Bodlets (the junior section to Bath Operatic and Dramatic Society) and changed its name to Zenith Youth Theatre Company in 2003. Its first major production was in 1964 at the Grand Pump Room, Bath.

The company was formed by Charles Davies and Victor Smith, members of Bath Operatic and Dramatic Society, in 1963 to encourage a younger generation to participate in amateur dramatics. Members were then encouraged to move on to the senior society once old enough. Its profile grew and by the late 1970s had a strong reputation for presenting musical theatre.

It changed its name to Zenith Youth Theatre Company in 2003. The first production under the new name was Some Like It Hot.

In November 2013 Lady Gass, the Lord Lieutenant of Somerset, presented the group with the Queen's Award for Voluntary Service at the Guildhall, Bath. Zenith received a certificate signed by The Queen and an exclusive commemorative engraved crystal. The chair of Bath and North East Somerset Council hosted the event in the chair's chamber and it was attended by volunteers, members, supporters and special guests of Zenith Youth Theatre.

In 2014, Zenith launched its Golden Anniversary year, culminating with an Anniversary Gala, uniting past and present members of the company on the stage of the Theatre Royal, Bath.

== Previous shows ==
1964–1974 Cabarets in various venues around Bath
1974 – Salad Days
1975 – The Boy Friend
1976 – Oliver!
1977 – Half a Sixpence
1978 – The Wizard of Oz & Joseph and the Amazing Technicolour Dreamcoat
1979 – Gypsy
1980 – Finians rainbow
1981 – Red Riding Hood & Viva Mexico
1982 – Tin Pan Alley
1983 – Return to Oz& Anne of Green Gables
1984 – Pinocchio & Dazzle
1985 – The Wizard of Oz & Gypsy
1986 – Alice & Blondel
1987 – Oliver! & Grease
1988 – The Boy Friend & West Side Story
1989 – Babes in Arms & How to Succeed in Business without really trying
1990 – Godspell & Viva Mexico
1991 – Oliver! & Sweet Charity
1992 – Bugsy Malone & Godspell
1993 – Grease & Jesus Christ Superstar
1994 – Cabaret, The Wizard of Oz & Rochdale Pioneers
1995 – Sweeney Todd (NODA Winner) & West Side Story
1996 – My Fair Lady (Rose Bowl Winner) & Into the Woods (Rose Bowl Winner)
1997 – Fiddler on the Roof & Joseph
1998 – Barnum & Jesus Christ Superstar
1999 – Return to the Forbidden Planet & Billy
2000 – Hot Mikado & Chess
2001 – West Side Story & South Pacific
2002 – City of Angels (NODA Winner) & Fame
2003 – Some Like It Hot & A Funny Thing Happened on the way to the Forum
2004 – Jesus Christ Superstar & Les Misérables (NODA Winner)
2005 – Crazy For You, Some Enchanted Evening & Barnum
2006 – The Mystery of Edwin Drood & Sweeney Todd (NODA Winner) (Rose Bowl Winner)
2007 – Joseph (Rose Bowl nominee) & Grand Hotel (Rose Bowl Winner)
2008 – The Wizard of Oz (Rose Bowl Winner) & Titanic the musical (Rose Bowl Winner)
2009 – Hot Mikado (Rose Bowl Winner) & Chess (Rose Bowl Winner)
2010 – Godspell & Dracula
2012 – 42nd Street & Evita
2013 – Animal Farm (Rose Bowl Winner) & Miss Saigon
2014 – Les Misérables & Anniversary Gala
2015 - Phantom Of The Opera & A Funny Thing Happened On The Way To The Forum
2016 - Cats (musical), Ghetto (play) & Return to the Forbidden Planet
2017 - Jekyll & Hyde (musical) & Summer Holiday
2018 - City of Angels (musical), Fame (musical) & Edinburgh Festival Fringe : Charlotte's Web, Female Transport, Lift & The Frogs (musical)
2019 - West Side Story & Titanic (musical)
2020 - Disney's My Son Pinocchio: Geppetto's Musical Tale

== Achievements ==
The group has had many achievements, these include:

- 1994 Performed the world premiere of The Rochdale Pioneers in front of Her Majesty the Queen.
- 1995 Awarded the NODA Regional Award for Excellence for Sweeney Todd.
- 1996 Double Rose Bowl Award winner for My Fair lady and Into the Woods.
- 1998 Performed live on national television on GMTV Christmas special.
- 2001 NODA Regional Award for excellence gained for the production of City of Angels.
- 2004 Being one of the first youth companies to be granted the right to perform Les Miserable in the UK.
- 2004 NODA Regional Award for excellence gained for Les Misérables
- 2006 Rose Bowl Award Winner for the Production of Sweeney Todd
- 2006 NODA South West Area Chairman's Award for Best Youth Production for Sweeney Todd
- 2007 Performed with Noel Edmonds on Noel's Christmas Presents - broadcast on Christmas morning.
- 2007 Rose Bowl Award for Best Youth Performance for Tallulah Last as Grusinskaya in Grand Hotel
- 2008 Rose Bowl Award for Best Youth Performance for Josh Carter as Scarecrow in The Wizard of Oz
- 2008 Rose Bowl Award for Best Youth Production for Titanic
- 2009 Rose Bowl Award for Best Youth Actor performance for Tom Corbishley for Koko in Hot Mikado
- 2009 Rose Bowl award for Best Youth Production for Chess
- 2013 Rose Bowl award for Best Youth Production for Animal Farm
