= Islington Chinese Association =

Islington Chinese Association (ICA) 依士靈頓華人協會
- Founded: Formed in 1986; Incorporated in 1991; Registered as a charity in 1994
- Type: Registered Charity
- Registration no.: Company registration number 02663906; Charity registration number 1042435
- Purpose: Community Cohesion
- Location: 21 Hatchard Road, London N19 4NG, United Kingdom
- Former Chairperson: Mrs Hanifah Law
- Website: https://www.islingtonchinese.com

Islington Chinese Association
- Traditional Chinese: 依士靈頓華人協會
- Simplified Chinese: 依士灵顿华人协会
Transcriptions
Standard Mandarin
- Hanyu Pinyin: Yīshìlíngdùn Huárén Xiéhuì

Islington Chinese Association (依士靈頓華人協會) is a London based registered charity with an aim to promote social cohesion across the United Kingdom. It was formed in London Borough of Islington in 1986. It was incorporated as a limited company by guarantee in 1991 and was recognised as a registered charity in 1994. Their current chair is Mr Christopher Ng and prior to that the chairperson was Mrs Hanifah Law.

Their work in the community includes organising Chinese New Year celebrations which are attended by the various diverse communities in Islington and beyond and is one of the highlights of the calendar.

== Award ==
In 2005, ICA was awarded The Queen's Award for Voluntary Service for "providing a multi-cultural resource centre for Chinese people and the wider community locally and nationally"。

== Historical records ==
ICA's historical records between 1987 and 2007 are held by the London Metropolitan Archives, with catalogue number LMA/4506。

== See also ==
- Chinese community in London
