= Luke Ambler =

Ireland international rugby league footballer

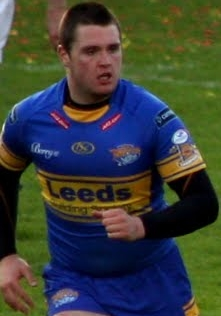

Personal information
- Full name: Luke Benedict Ambler
- Born: 18 December 1989 (age 36) Halifax, West Yorkshire, England

Playing information
- Height: 6 ft 3 in (1.91 m)
- Weight: 15 st 13 lb (101 kg)
- Position: Prop, Second-row, Loose forward
Club
Years	Team	Pld	T	G	FG	P
2008	Salford City Reds	1	1	0	0	4
2009–12	Leeds Rhinos	10	1	0	0	4
2009(loan)	→ York City Knights	4	1	0	0	4
2011(loan)	→ Harlequins RL	24	1	0	0	4
2012–17	Halifax	143	32	0	0	128
	Total	182	36	0	0	144
Representative
Years	Team	Pld	T	G	FG	P
2009–16	Ireland	19	5	0	0	20

Luke Benedict Ambler (born 18 December 1989) is a former Ireland international rugby league footballer who played in the 2000s and 2010s. He has played at representative level for Yorkshire (Under-17s) and Ireland, and at club level for Elland ARLFC, in the Super League for the Salford City Reds, and the Leeds Rhinos, in 2009's National League One for the York City Knights (loan), in 2011's Super League XVI for the Harlequins RL (loan) and in the Championship for Halifax, as a prop, second-row or loose forward.

== Background ==
Luke Ambler was born in Halifax, West Yorkshire, England, he has Irish ancestors, and eligible to play for Ireland due to the grandparent rule.

== Playing career ==
Ambler made his full début with the Salford City Reds in August 2008. In December of the same year, following the expiry of his contract with the Salford City Reds, he signed on for a two-year contract with the Leeds Rhinos. He played for Harlequins RL during the 2011 Super League season, and moved to Halifax in 2012. Ambler made his Ireland début against Serbia in 2009. He was named to the Ireland squad for the 2013 Rugby League World Cup. Luke played in the 2014 and 2015 European Cup tournaments. In 2016, he was called up to the Ireland squad for the 2017 Rugby League World Cup European Pool B qualifiers.

== Personal life ==
In the summer of 2016, after the suicide of his brother-in-law, Luke founded Andy's Man Club and has become an ambassador for suicide prevention.
