= Brighton & Hove LGBT Switchboard =

British LGBT telephone hotline

Switchboard
- Formation: April 1975; 51 years ago
- Founded at: Brighton
- Type: NGO
- Registration no.: 1088133
- Legal status: Charitable organization
- Headquarters: 113 Queens Rd, Brighton and Hove, Brighton BN1 3XG
- Services: BOLD, Domestic Abuse, Sexual Harms, Grief Meets, Rainbow Neighbours, Recover with Pride, Inclusion Project, Dementia Café, Trans Survivors Switchboard, Disability Project, Rainbow Cafe
- CEO: Rob Sainsbury
- Volunteers: 30
- Website: https://www.switchboard.org.uk/?v=7885444af42e
- Formerly called: Brighton Gay and Lesbian Switchboard

Switchboard, formerly Brighton & Hove LGBT Switchboard, was a British listening service or hotline, for the LGBT communities based in Brighton. It service was launched, with just one telephone, in April 1975 at the Open Cafe, a centre for alternative politics, at 7 Victoria Road. It was started by four men and two women and was initially known as The Lavender Line.

Now, Brighton & Hove LGBT Switchboard focuses on other work such as BOLD (Bereavement, Older People, Loneliness and Dementia), Rainbow Neighbour Service, Recover with Pride, Sexual Harms, Domestic Abuse and TNBI Social Prescribing. The helpline service is now dealt with externally.

== See also ==
- Gay & Lesbian Switchboard of New York
- London Friend
- Oxford Friend
- Switchboard (UK)
