= South Norfolk Youth Symphonic Band =

- Also known as: SNYSB
- Origin: Diss, Norfolk, UK
- Genres: Classical, film music, big band, swing, contemporary, show
- Occupation: Symphonic band,
- Years active: 1974–present
- Members: Musical Director; Mike Booty
- Website: www.snysb.org.uk

South Norfolk Youth Symphonic Band (often shortened to SNYSB) is a group of young musicians aged 8–23 based in Diss, South Norfolk. The band motto is "Music is fun".

== History ==
The band was formed in 1974 by the current musical director and conductor, Mike Booty. They have toured Germany, and also performed at many venues across South Norfolk.

In 2006 they successfully applied for charitable status.

In June 2006 they won the Queen's Award for Voluntary Service. Two of the more long-standing band-members were later invited back to meet the Queen and the Duke of Edinburgh in London in 2008

== Music ==
SNYSB play a range of music including show music, film music, big band, swing, classical and contemporary. They have one of the largest music library's owned by any band of this kind.

Some members of the band own their own instruments, while others borrow the SNYSB ones. SNYSB has received various donations of money, including a large sum from the National Lottery, which have allowed them to purchase some more expensive instruments such as a bassoon, a contrabass clarinet, and a full percussion section.

Other instruments played in the band are: flute, piccolo, clarinet, oboe, trumpet, cornet, trombone, french horn, alto saxophone, tenor saxophone, tuba, bass guitar, bass clarinet, bass saxophone.

== Tour of the Far East ==
The band took part in a fourteen-day tour of Singapore, Malaysia and Thailand in August 2008. As part of their tour, they played six days of concerts or performances, including three joint concerts. The first was with the TKGS Symphonic Band, the second was with the HCI Symphonic Band, and the third was with Tsung Tsin School in Kota Kinabalu.

They saw how the money they raised following the 2004 tsunami was used to help build a community centre in Krabi, Thailand, and also took part in music workshops with orphaned children in Ban Nam Kem as part of a Community involvement programme. The tour, which was organised in connection with the Rotary clubs of Singapore, Malaysia and Thailand also consisted of sightseeing in Singapore, Peninsular Malaysia, East Malaysia (Borneo) and Thailand.

== Further Tours ==
SNYSB are undertaking another tour to Malaysia in August 2019 and will be running workshops in schools and performing concerts.
