= Jane Sandall =

Midwife and women's health academic

Jane Sandall CBE
- Education: London South Bank University; University of London; University of Surrey
- Occupations: Midwife, professor

Jane Sandall CBE is professor of social science and women's health at the Women's Health Academic Centre of King's College London. Sandall leads the Maternal Health Services and Policy Research Group in King's Health Partners Women’s Health Academic Centre and is also a lead for the National Institute for Health Research (NIHR) South London Applied Research Collaboration. She has authored several Cochrane reviews on midwife-led settings and hundreds of peer-reviewed papers. Her contribution to midwifery and women's health was awarded with an CBE. She also received an honorary doctorate in health sciences from the University of Technology Sydney in 2014.

== Biography ==
Jane Sandall is a midwife and started her clinical career in Malawi. She then returned to the UK and completed a bachelor's in social science at London South Bank University in 1990, a Masters at Royal Holloway, University of London in 1991 and a PhD in sociology at University of Surrey in 1998. Her research has been funded by the ESRC, MRC, Wellcome Trust, NIHR, and other charitable sources.

== Academic work ==
Her research examines the use of new technologies into health care, and ways of organising services to bridge gaps in care and improve quality and safety including midwifery models of care. Research she has conducted or been involved with includes organisational case studies looking at safety of Birthplace in England, and the relationship between maternity workforce staffing and outcomes using secondary data analysis. Her research has been used by the UK government commission on Nursing and Midwifery, House of Commons Health Committee on Inequalities, NHS London, and US, Brazilian and Australian reviews of maternity services.

Jane Sandall is also a member of RCOG Stillbirth Clinical Studies Group and a member of the NIHR Advanced Fellowship Panel and the ESRC Peer Review College. She is associate editor of the journal Midwifery.

She was elected a Fellow of the Academy of Medical Sciences in 2024.

== Most cited publications ==
- Sandall J, Soltani H, Gates S, Shennan A, Devane D. Midwife‐led continuity models versus other models of care for childbearing women. Cochrane Database of Systematic Reviews. 2016(4). According to Google Scholar, it has been cited 1509 times
- Hatem M, Sandall J, Devane D, Soltani H, Gates S. Midwife‐led versus other models of care for childbearing women. Cochrane database of systematic reviews. 2008(4). According to Google Scholar, this article has been cited 763 times
- Gagnon AJ, Sandall J. Individual or group antenatal education for childbirth or parenthood, or both. Cochrane database of systematic reviews. 2007(3). According to Google Scholar, this article has been cited 546 times
- Poston L, Bell R, Croker H, Flynn AC, Godfrey KM, Goff L, Hayes L, Khazaezadeh N, Nelson SM, Oteng-Ntim E, Pasupathy D. Effect of a behavioural intervention in obese pregnant women (the UPBEAT study): a multicentre, randomised controlled trial. The lancet Diabetes & endocrinology. 2015 Oct 1;3(10):767-77. According to Google Scholar, this article has been cited 503 times
- Sandall J, Tribe RM, Avery L, Mola G, Visser GH, Homer CS, Gibbons D, Kelly NM, Kennedy HP, Kidanto H, Taylor P. Short-term and long-term effects of caesarean section on the health of women and children. The Lancet. 2018 Oct 13;392(10155):1349-57. According to Google Scholar, this article has been cited 347 times
- Homer CS, Friberg IK, Dias MA, ten Hoope-Bender P, Sandall J, Speciale AM, Bartlett LA. The projected effect of scaling up midwifery. The Lancet. 2014 Sep 20;384(9948):1146-57.According to Google Scholar, this article has been cited 277 times
- Leap N, Sandall J, Buckland S, Huber U. Journey to confidence: women's experiences of pain in labour and relational continuity of care. Journal of Midwifery & Women's Health, 2010 May 1;55(3):234-42. According to Google Scholar, this article has been cited 232 times
