= Switchboard (UK) =

UK telephone helpline for LGBT+ people

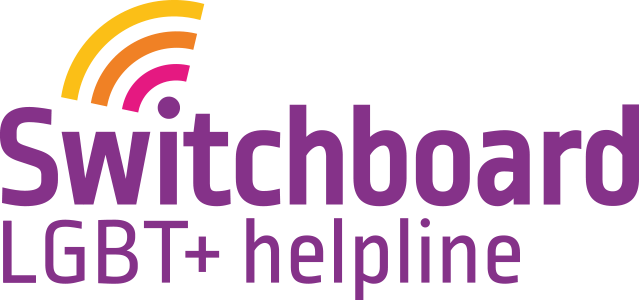
- Formation: 4 March 1974
- Founded at: London
- Type: LGBT Helpline
- Registration no.: Charity number 296193 / Company number 02098685
- Legal status: Charitable organisation / Company limited by guarantee
- Location: London
- Region served: United Kingdom
- Services: LGBTQ Support
- Methods: Telephone, instant messaging, email
- Staff: 12
- Volunteers: c. 200
- Website: switchboard.lgbt
- Remarks: Helpline Number: 0300 330 0630
- Formerly called: London Gay Switchboard / London Lesbian and Gay Switchboard

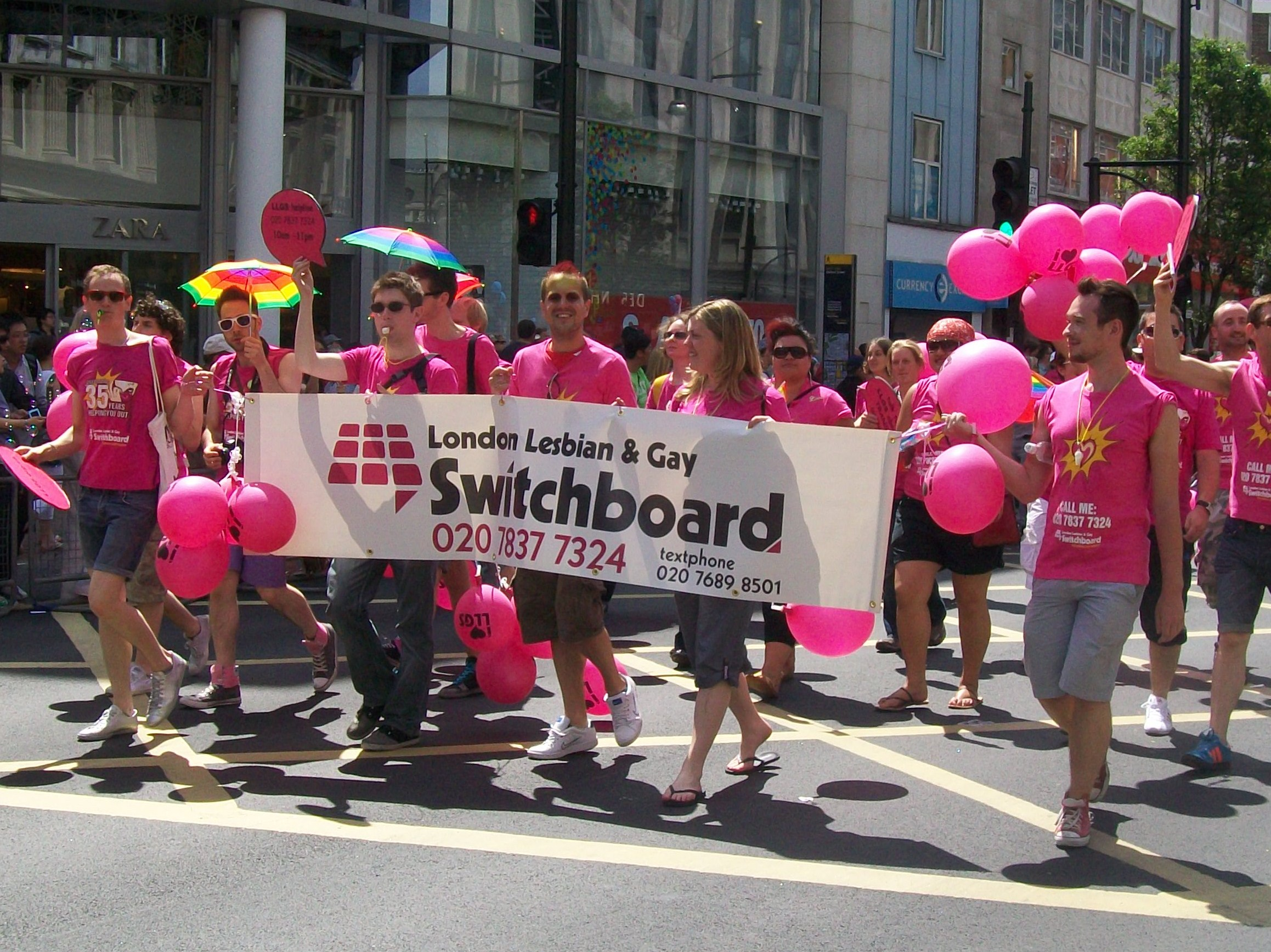
London Lesbian and Gay Switchboard group at Pride London 2010.

Switchboard is the second-oldest LGBTQ+ telephone helpline in the United Kingdom, launched the day after Edinburgh Befrienders (later known as Lothian Gay and Lesbian Switchboard).

Switchboard was launched in March 1974 as the London Lesbian and Gay Switchboard, providing help and information to London's gay community, particularly in the aftermath of the 1967 partial decriminalisation of male homosexuality in England and Wales. It received its first call on 4 March 1974.

In the 1980s, Switchboard was the leading source of information on HIV/AIDS, with some of Switchboard's volunteers amongst the founding members of the Terrence Higgins Trust.

In 2008, Switchboard was the recipient of the Queen's Award for Voluntary Service. The organisation went to Buckingham Palace to receive the award. In 2014, Queen Elizabeth II acknowledged the 40th anniversary of the organisation's founding, marking the first time she had personal involvement, voiced support or recognised an LGBT charity during her reign, and the first time the Crown has ever publicly supported the LGBT community. LLGS received a comment from the Queen saying: "Best wishes and congratulations to all concerned on this most special anniversary."

Switchboard rebranded to its current name in 2015 to emphasize inclusion for persons of all sexual orientation and gender identities, and that its services are not limited to London.

Today, it has expanded considerably to more than 15,000 callers each year, and now also provides support through email and instant messaging. Switchboard provides a listening service for people to discuss their feelings in an impartial and non-judgmental way, as well as information and advice for going out in London and the UK.

== See also ==
- Brighton & Hove LGBT Switchboard
- Gay & Lesbian Switchboard of New York
- London Friend
- The Log Books, a podcast (and now book) adapted from the log books of Switchboard
