= Sandall Park =

Park in Doncaster, South Yorkshire, England

Coordinates: 53.545051°N 1.088677°W

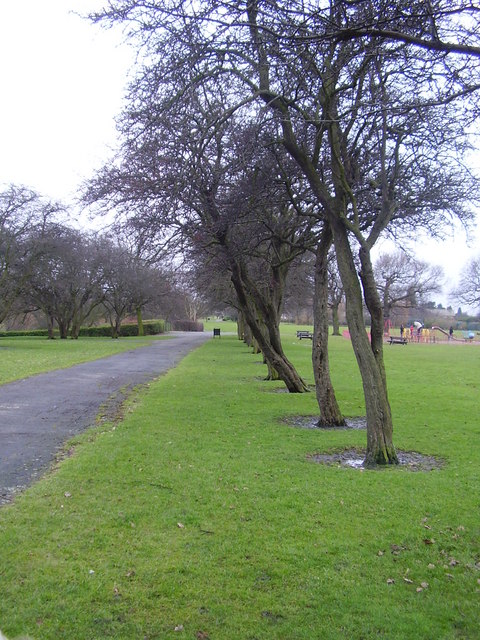
- Row of hawthorns along a path in Sandall Park
- Interactive map of Sandall Park
- Location: Doncaster
- OS grid: SE 60485 05765
- Area: 69 acres (28 ha)
- Created: 1940
- Operator: Doncaster Metropolitan Borough Council
- Open: Open
- Website: www.sandallpark.org.uk

Sandall Park is a park in Doncaster, South Yorkshire, England. The park covers 69 acres and is located in Wheatley and is one of the biggest leisure parks in Doncaster.

== History ==
Before 1841 the land was the site of a brick works and the lake is a result of the extraction of clay from the area. It was 1940 before it was officially opened as a park.

== Features ==
The park plays host to 3 football pitches and a fishing lake and a smaller lake. Prior to the 1980s the fishing lake had small boats for park users to use hence the park is known locally as the 'Boating Lake'. There are also two children playgrounds, one of which was built in 2010. The funding for the second playground came from central government through the playbuilder scheme and the Veolia Environmental Trust. The playground includes equipment which encourages children's balance and fitness and a children’s play train which reflects the heritage of the park as there was once a children's train in the park which was removed in the late 1970s. There are also 3 fitness trails with fitness equipment.

== Friends of Sandall Park ==
The Friends of Sandall Park is a registered charity formed in 2003 which is committed to the promotion, support, assistance and regeneration of the park. In 2011 the group won the Queen's Award for Voluntary Service. The award which is the equivalent to an MBE and is the highest award that can be made to a voluntary group was made for their continued efforts in the park which benefits both park visitors and wildlife. The group has also won awards locally including the pride in Doncaster Love Where You Live Award 2012, Doncaster Free Press Community Environmental Award.
