= The King's Award for Voluntary Service =

British award

- Award logo
- Awarded for: For outstanding achievement by groups of volunteers
- Country: United Kingdom, Crown Dependencies
- Presented by: The King
- First award: 2003
- Website: kavs.dcms.gov.uk

The King's Award for Voluntary Service, previously known as The Queen's Award for Voluntary Service, (Note: Also known by its special editions' names: "The Queen's Golden Jubilee Award for Voluntary Service by Groups in the Community", "The Queen's Diamond Jubilee Volunteering Award", and "Queen Elizabeth II Platinum Jubilee Volunteering Award".) is an annual award given to groups in the voluntary sector of the United Kingdom and the Crown Dependencies. Until 2022, awardees were announced in the London Gazette on 2 June each year, the anniversary of the coronation of Elizabeth II. Starting in 2023, the awards have been announced on 14 November, Charles III's birthday.

The award is equivalent to the MBE and is the highest award that can be made to a voluntary group. The award is managed by the UK Department for Culture, Media and Sport.

== History ==
The award was announced by Elizabeth II on 30 April 2002, in celebration of her Golden Jubilee, as part of her Golden Jubilee speech to the House of Lords and House of Commons. The first awards were made in 2003, then called the Queen's Golden Jubilee Award.

In February 2023, it was announced by Charles III that he wished to continue his mother's legacy by giving his name to the awards. The awards will be announced annually from 2023 on his birthday, 14 November.

== Eligibility ==
Groups of three or more people can be nominated. The group must have been in operation for at least three years and their work must provide a specific and direct benefit to the local community.

== Award ==
Nominations are made online and around one in three nominations are successful. Winners receive a certificate signed by the King and a domed glass crystal. The volunteer group's representatives also may be invited to attend a royal garden party by the King.

== Procedure for assessment and selection ==
Each nomination is first appraised in the county or crown dependency where the group works. This appraisal is led by the Lord Lieutenant (or Lieutenant Governor in the Crown Dependencies), His Majesty's representative in the county or country, helped by a County/Country Assessment Panel of leading representatives from diverse sectors of the community. The Lord Lieutenant/Lieutenant Governor or their representatives, or both, may meet with the nominated group.

A Specialist Assessment Panel of independent volunteering experts from across the UK judge nominated groups against the award criteria, taking into account the first appraisal. The panel passes its recommendations to the Main Award Committee.

The Main Award Committee advise the Cabinet Office and the Minister for Civil Society.

The award is decided after the King has given his formal approval.

== Recipients of The King's Award for Voluntary Service (2023 onwards) ==
The recipients of the inaugural King's Award for Voluntary Service were gazetted on Tuesday 14 November 2023. There were 251 recipients in 2023, 281 in 2024 and 231 in 2025.

== Recipients of The Queen's Award for Voluntary Service (up to 2022) ==
Up to and including 2022 over 3,000 groups received the award. Recipients included:

- 24:7 Theatre Arts Network (2016)
- Afghanistan and Central Asian Association (2018)
- Andy's Man Club (2021)
- Bilston Town F.C. (2017)
- Blood Bikes Wales (2021)
- Blue Apple Theatre (2012)
- British Red Cross (Skin Camouflage Service 2004; Fire and Emergency Support 2009; Refugee Service Portsmouth 2010)
- Cardiff Rivers Group (2015)
- Ford Park Cemetery Trust (2005)
- Freewheelers EVS (2008)
- Glentoran F.C. (2018)
- Highfields Sports Leadership Academy (2010)
- Hospital Radio Plymouth (2011)
- Inspiration FM (2004)
- Inverness Hospital Radio (2012)
- Islington Chinese Association (2005)
- Kennet and Avon Canal Trust (2013)
- Maritime Volunteer Service (The Queen's Diamond Jubilee Volunteering Award 2012)
- Muslim Hands (2019)
- National Coastwatch Institution (Mundesley 2009; Cornwall 2010; Dorset Region 2012; Prawle Point Devon 2012; Lincolnshire 2013; Needles 2018; Calshot Tower 2019)
- North Devon Hospice (2020)
- Oxford Friend Lesbian and Gay Helpline (2006)
- Friends of Sandall Park (2011)
- South Norfolk Youth Symphonic Band (2006)
- Swindon 105.5 (2014)
- London Lesbian and Gay Switchboard (2007)
- Talyllyn Railway Preservation Society (2013)
- Ulster Aviation Society (2018)
- Warwickshire Vision Support (2020)
- UK Zion, Manchester Branch (2016)
- Zenith Youth Theatre Company (2013)
