= Gay & Lesbian Switchboard of New York =

The Gay & Lesbian Switchboard of New York is considered the "oldest operating GLBT hotline in the world". Initial planning began with 1971 meetings to establish the Gay Switchboard, led by eight individuals from Gay Activists Alliance, Beyond, and the recently dissolved Gay Liberation Front. The program launched with its first call on 13 January 1972 received at the Liberation House Gay Collective (247 West 11th Street), and grew to field 400 calls per week (20,000 per year) in the 1970s.

The object was to provide information of interest to Gay people in an unbiased, non-judgmental manner while allowing volunteers the option of expressing their own point of view, and to counsel people to the best of their ability. It was decided that the organization would remain independent.

— 1978 Gay Switchboard information packet

Records of phone calls fielded by volunteers, from March 1972 to July 1983, form most of the archives of the organization, preserved at the New York Public Library as part of its collection inherited from the International Gay Information Center Archives.

In 1977, the organization joined with like-minded organizations to create the joint Gay and Lesbian Services Center (110 East 23rd Street), while incorporating on its own as the Gay Switchboard of New York, Inc.

In the mid-1980s the Gay Switchboard of New York became the Gay and Lesbian Switchboard of New York, Inc based at 648 Broadway. According to The New York Times, the hotline was headquartered "in a closet" at Man's Country New York bathhouse sometime before the move to Broadway.

Founded independently, the hotline is now part of the network administered by the LGBT National Help Center as the LGBT Switchboard of New York. The number has remained 212-989-0999.

The hotline was fictionalized in the play Emotional Rescue by Joseph Benjamin at Westbeth Center in 1986, performed by the Stonewall Repertory Theater.

== See also ==
- London Lesbian and Gay Switchboard
