= Freewheeler =

Freewheeler may refer to:

Noun

1. Someone acting freely or even irresponsibly.
2. A person who is primarily concerned with having a good time.

== Transport ==
- Harley-Davidson Freewheeler

=== Blood Bikes (UK motorcycle courier charities) ===
- Freewheelers EVS, primarily operating in Somerset, Bristol, Bath and North East Somerset, North Somerset, South Gloucestershire and western parts of Wiltshire
- Devon Freewheelers, primarily operating in Devon
- Midland Freewheelers, primarily operating in the West Midlands
- Severn Freewheelers, primarily operating in Gloucestershire, Herefordshire, Worcestershire and north Wiltshire
- Yeovil Freewheelers, primarily operating in Dorset, Somerset

== Music ==
- The Freewheelers (band)
- Freewheeler (album), an album by David Ball
- "Freewheeler", a song from the album Cowboy Songs Four by Michael Martin Murphey

== Other uses ==
- Freewheelers (TV series), a British television series made from 1968 to 1973
- The Freewheelers, a 1961 British TV play written by Giles Cooper

== See also ==
- Freewheel (disambiguation)
