= Blood Bikes Wales =

Motorcycle courier charity

- Type: Registered charity
- Registration no.: 1143352
- Purpose: NHS motorcycle courier
- Location: Wales
- Region served: Wales
- Website: bloodbikes.wales

Blood Bikes Wales is a blood bike charity based in Wales. Founded in 2011, it provides a free motorcycle courier service to NHS Wales hospitals across the country, operating a fleet of motorcycles which are ridden and co-ordinated by volunteers. Blood Bikes Wales is a member of the Nationwide Association of Blood Bikes (NABB) and co-operates with similar organisations in England.

== Operations ==
Blood Bikes Wales was formed in 2011 and now has 23 bikes on the road in six of the local health boards in Wales: Swansea Bay University Health Board (Swansea) Cwm Taf Morgannwg University Health Board (Merthyr Tydfil, Llantrisant) Hywel Dda (Carmarthenshire, Ceredigion and Pembrokeshire) Aneurin Bevan University Health Board (Newport, Caerphilly, Monmouthshire), Betsi Cadwaladr University Health Board (Wrexham and Bangor), and Powys Teaching Health Board (Ceredigion, Newport, Swansea).

Operating between 7 pm and 10 am on weekdays and 24 hours at weekends and public holidays, the charity provides a service enabling hospitals to avoid the need to use taxis or commercial couriers, saving the NHS money.

During the COVID-19 pandemic in the United Kingdom, the charity responded by temporarily extending its service to operate 24/7.

== Accolades ==
In November 2019, Blood Bikes Wales was awarded the Organisation of the Year Award at the Wales Council for Voluntary Action (WCVA) Welsh Charities Awards.

On 2 June 2021, Blood Bikes Wales was awarded the Queen's Award for Voluntary Service, the highest award that can be given to a voluntary organisation in the United Kingdom and equivalent to an MBE. Blood Bikes Wales were also awarded an additional special designation for providing impactful support to their communities during the COVID-19 pandemic in the United Kingdom.

== See also ==
- Emergency medical services in the United Kingdom
- Outline of motorcycles and motorcycling
