= Severn Freewheelers =

Severn Freewheelers EVS
- Founded: March 2007
- Type: Registered charity
- Registration no.: 1120999
- Purpose: NHS motorcycle courier
- Region served: Gloucestershire, Worcestershire, Herefordshire, North Wiltshire
- Revenue: £181,816 (year ending 31 Dec 2017)
- Volunteers: 70
- Website: www.severnfreewheelers.org.uk

Severn Freewheelers Emergency Voluntary Service is a blood bike charity based in the Severn Valley in western England. Founded in 2007, it provides a free motorcycle courier service to hospitals in the region, operating a fleet of emergency-equipped motorcycles which are ridden and co-ordinated by volunteers. Severn Freewheelers is a founder-member of the Nationwide Association of Blood Bikes and co-operates with similar organisations in the area including Freewheelers EVS (Bristol and Somerset), SERV (south England) and Midland Freewheelers (north-west Birmingham).

== Operations ==
Severn Freewheelers works for hospitals in Gloucestershire, Herefordshire, Worcestershire and north Wiltshire, including Swindon.

Operations extend into southern Birmingham and Coventry. Major hospitals served include Gloucester Royal, Cheltenham General, Hereford County, Worcester Royal, Redditch Alexandra and Great Western, Swindon, with many smaller hospitals also served including Tewkesbury, Moreton-in-Marsh, Cinderford, Stroud, Dursley, Cirencester, Ross-on-Wye, Leominster, Bromyard, Ledbury, Kidderminster, Bromsgrove, Malvern, Tenbury Wells, Evesham, Pershore, Chippenham and Savernake.

Operating between 7 pm and 7 am on weekdays and 24 hours at weekends and public holidays, the charity provides a service enabling hospitals to avoid the need to use taxis or commercial couriers, saving the NHS an estimated £150,000 each year across the area.

By December 2019, the charity had covered over 1,700,000 miles, had responded to more than 46,000 calls, and was receiving over 500 calls each month. Items carried include samples for pathological or micro-biological analysis, blood and blood products for transfusion, patient notes, drugs, scans and medical equipment. Recent developments include the collection of human breast milk from donors’ homes and its transport to human milk banks at Oxford, Bristol and Birmingham.

During the COVID-19 pandemic in the United Kingdom, the charity responded by temporarily extending its service to operate 24/7. In addition, around 80 volunteers were recruited from the general public to make home deliveries of medications from general hospitals in Hereford and Gloucestershire. Nearly 3,000 deliveries had been made as of September 2020.

== Fund-raising ==
In 2011, the charity held its first Prescott Bike Festival at the Prescott Speed Hill Climb circuit near Bishop's Cleeve in Gloucestershire, which attracted 5,000 visitors. This became an annual event with the final bike festival taking place in 2025.

It also mounts displays at local shows such as the Three Counties Show, the Cotswold Show, the Emergency Services Show, and local music festivals, and attends motorcycle safety events such as BikeSafe. Several motorcycling celebrities including racers Carl Fogarty and Jamie Whitham have offered to help support the charity in raising funds to support its work.
