= Freewheelers EVS =

English blood bike charity

- Founded: April 1990
- Type: Registered charity
- Registration no.: 1001067
- Location: South West England
- Region served: Somerset, Bristol, Bath, West Wiltshire, South Gloucestershire
- Services: NHS motorcycle courier
- Revenue: £260,627 (year ending 31 March 2020)
- Volunteers: 184 (May 2025)
- Website: freewheelers.org.uk

Freewheelers Emergency Voluntary Service (EVS) is a blood bike charity based in South West England. Founded in Weston-super-Mare in 1990, it is funded by public donations and staffed by unpaid volunteers.

== Association with other blood bike charities ==
Freewheelers EVS are a founding member of the Nationwide Association of Blood Bikes (NABB), which acts as an umbrella charity for all blood bike charities. It inspired the foundation of a new charity, White Knights EVS in West Yorkshire. Neighbouring charities include Severn Freewheelers, SERV, and Yeovil Freewheelers, which was founded in 1978.

== Operations ==
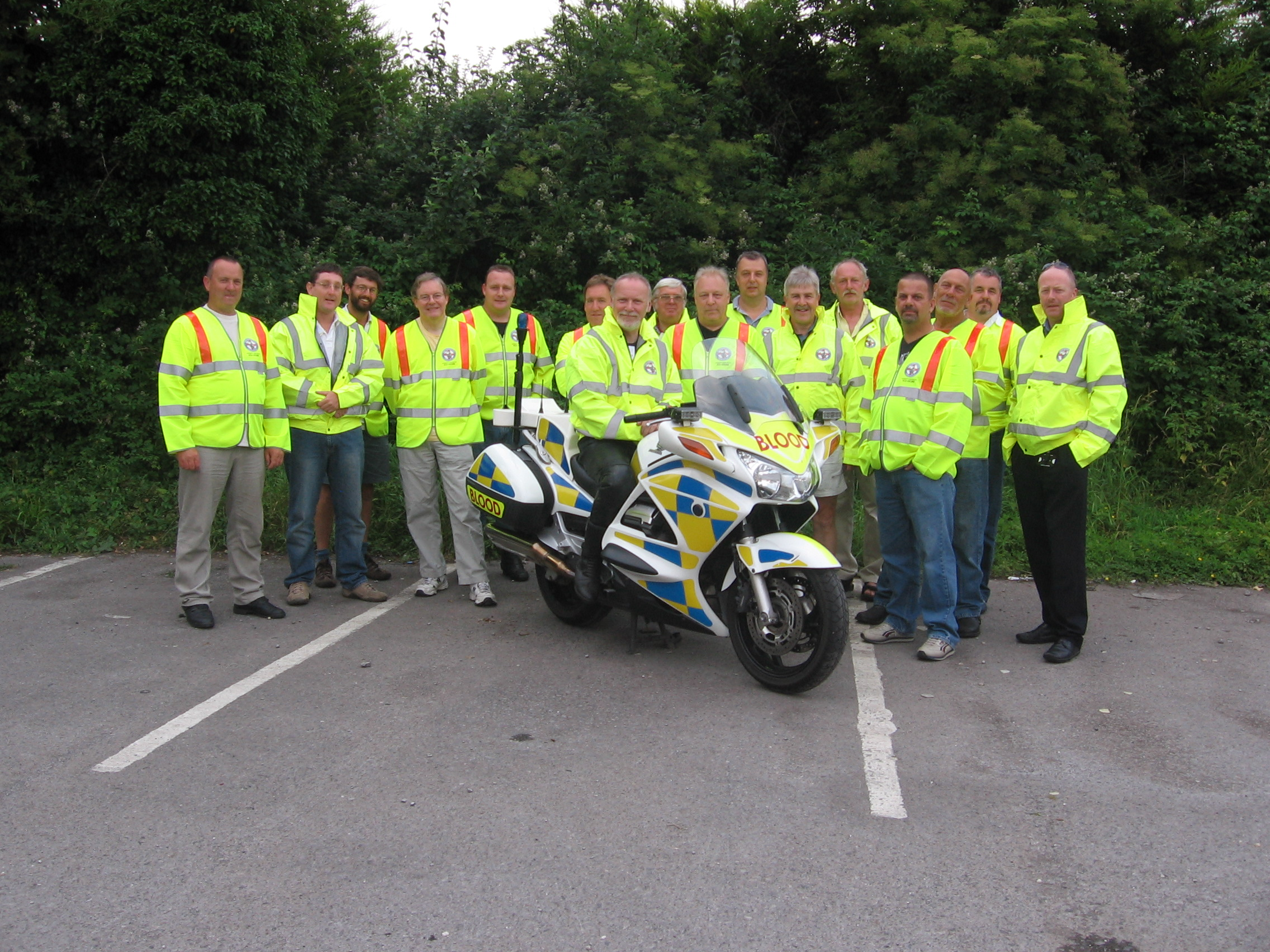
Freewheelers EVS members in uniform high visibility jackets

The charity operates in Somerset, Bristol, Bath and North East Somerset, North Somerset, South Gloucestershire and western parts of Wiltshire. It is used by NHS in the area, including major hospitals such as Bristol Royal Infirmary, Southmead, Weston General, the RUH in Bath, and Musgrove Park in Taunton. Minor injuries units, GP surgeries, care homes, hospices and patients' home addresses make up the other destinations often visited.

=== Coordinator and riders ===
Freewheelers operates from 19:00 to 07:00 during the week and 24 hours at weekends and public holidays. On any given shift there is one coordinator and five riders on duty. The riders are spread across the area of operation. In general one is in the vicinity of Bath, one in the vicinity of Bristol and one in the vicinity of Taunton. The fourth rider can be used anywhere across the whole area to assist when particularly busy or if one of the riders is in need of a break. A fifth rider exchanges transfusion blood with the Wiltshire Air Ambulance and Great Western Air Ambulance air bases. All the riders hold an advanced motorcycling qualification, such as an IAM RoadSmart or RoSPA test pass. There is also a requirement to retake this assessment every three years to maintain a high standard of riding. This partly due to insurance purposes but also tied into the aim of the charity to encourage safe riding and promote a positive image of motorcycling.

=== Items carried ===
The charity's volunteers transport blood for transfusion, tissue samples for pathological or microbiological analysis, drugs, patient notes, medical images and medical devices. It has also carried more unusual items such as antivenom and artificial limbs. Since 2010, Freewheelers has also been transporting human breast milk to and from the breast milk bank at Southmead Hospital.

=== Air ambulance ===
As of 2015, EVS participated in a daily delivery of type O negative blood to Wiltshire Air Ambulance and Great Western Air Ambulance, with the latter also taking delivery of fresh frozen plasma.

=== Beyond the area ===
If jobs require transport beyond the Freewheelers EVS area of operation, there is coordination with neighbouring blood bike charities to relay items and pass them on at pre-arranged handover locations. This goes for shipments leaving the area, such consignments of breast milk, or inbound items destined for the charity's area. Samples often require transport to the NHS Blood and Transplant centre at Filton. The site also houses the International Blood Group Reference Laboratory (IBGRL), which performs rare blood identification.

== Motorcycles ==
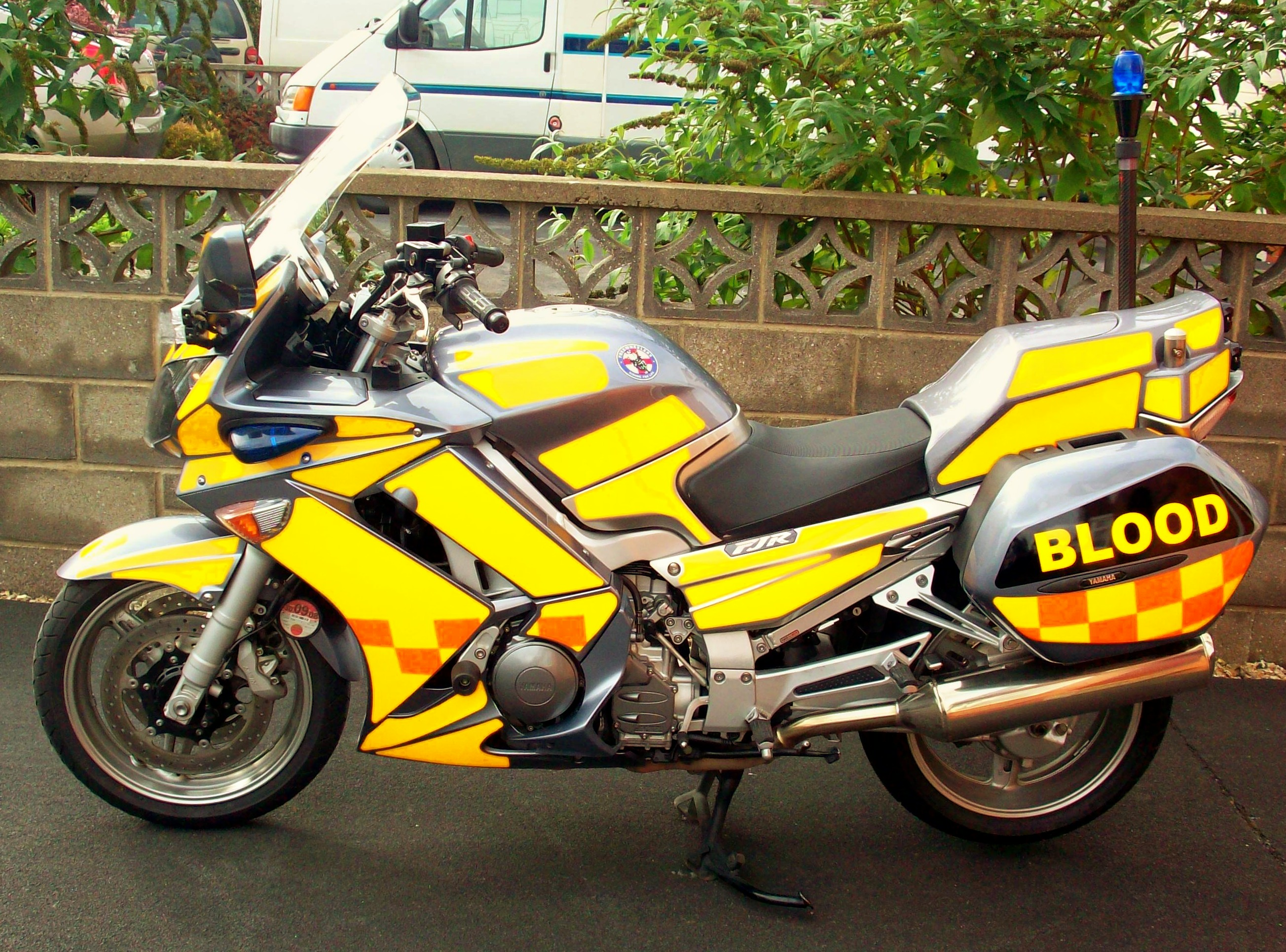
Freewheelers Yamaha FJR1300

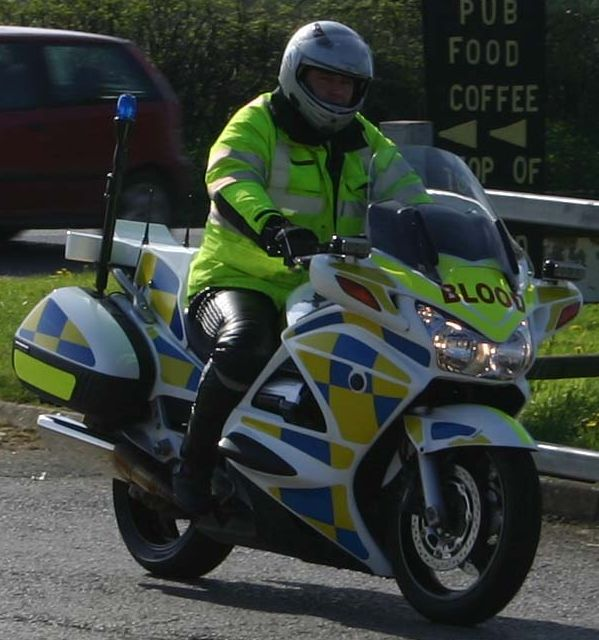
Honda ST1300 Pan European previously operated by Freewheelers EVS

Freewheelers owns and operates a fleet of blood bike liveried Yamaha FJR1300, BMW R1200RT-P and BMW F800GT motorcycles fitted with blue lights and sirens. Previously ex-police motorcycles were used, such as the Honda ST Pan-European series.

The latest Yamaha FJR1300 motorcycles are the first to be purpose-built for Blood Bike duties through an arrangement between NABB and Yamaha with equipment designed and fitted by Woodway Engineering.

== Funding ==
Freewheelers EVS is 100% funded by public donations. Money is raised through a variety of avenues with events highlighted on the website. These events range from bucket collections at supermarkets to giving talks to local groups.

In 2010, the pupils of All Hallows Preparatory School near Shepton Mallet staged a number of fundraising events, including a sponsored bicycle ride from John o' Groats to Land's End by two parents, to buy a new BMW R1200RT motorcycle, which was presented to Freewheelers on 1 July 2010. One of the pupils won a competition to name the new bike "The Flying Crane"—the school's logo is a Crane.

== Accolades ==
On 2 June 2008, Freewheelers EVS was awarded the Queen's Award for Voluntary Service, the highest award that can be given to a voluntary organisation in the United Kingdom and equivalent to an MBE.

In July 2008, Freewheelers EVS was awarded the Chair's Community Award of 2008/09 by the Chair of Bath and North East Somerset Council, Councillor David Bellotti at the Guildhall in Bath.

In March 2016, Freewheelers EVS won the "Voluntary and Community Sector Team of the Year" category in the Bristol Post Health and Care Awards.

In The People's Projects awards 2017, West Country East, Freewheelers EVS was voted one of the winners and awarded £30,000 of lottery funds to purchase two new FJR1300 motorcycles.

== See also ==
- Emergency medical services in the United Kingdom
- Outline of motorcycles and motorcycling
