= Whiteknights Yorkshire Blood Bikes =

English charity

Whiteknights Yorkshire Blood Bikes is a blood bike charity which operates in Yorkshire, England.

It was set up by motorcyclist Vic Siswick in 2008, when he noticed a lack of blood and pathology sample delivery provision at night while he was undergoing cancer treatment. The group has sixty volunteer riders, all advanced motorcyclists, who deliver urgent samples outside normal National Health Service office hours between 7 pm and 7 am every weekday. Running costs of the charity are about £40,000 a year, which is used for fuel and maintenance of the charity's seven motorbikes, each of which cover up to 20,000 miles (32,000 km) a year.

In October 2017, the charity began providing daily deliveries from Pinderfields Hospital to the Air Support Unit at Nostell in support of the Yorkshire Air Ambulance's "Blood On Board" initiative.
