= Freewheel (disambiguation) =

A freewheel is a device in a transmission that disengages the driveshaft from the driven shaft when the driven shaft rotates faster than the driveshaft.

Freewheel or freewheeling may also refer to:

- Freewheel (bicycle part)
- Freewheel (song)
- Freewheeling (film)

== See also ==
- Freewheelers (disambiguation)
