= Blood bike =

Emergency medical courier vehicle

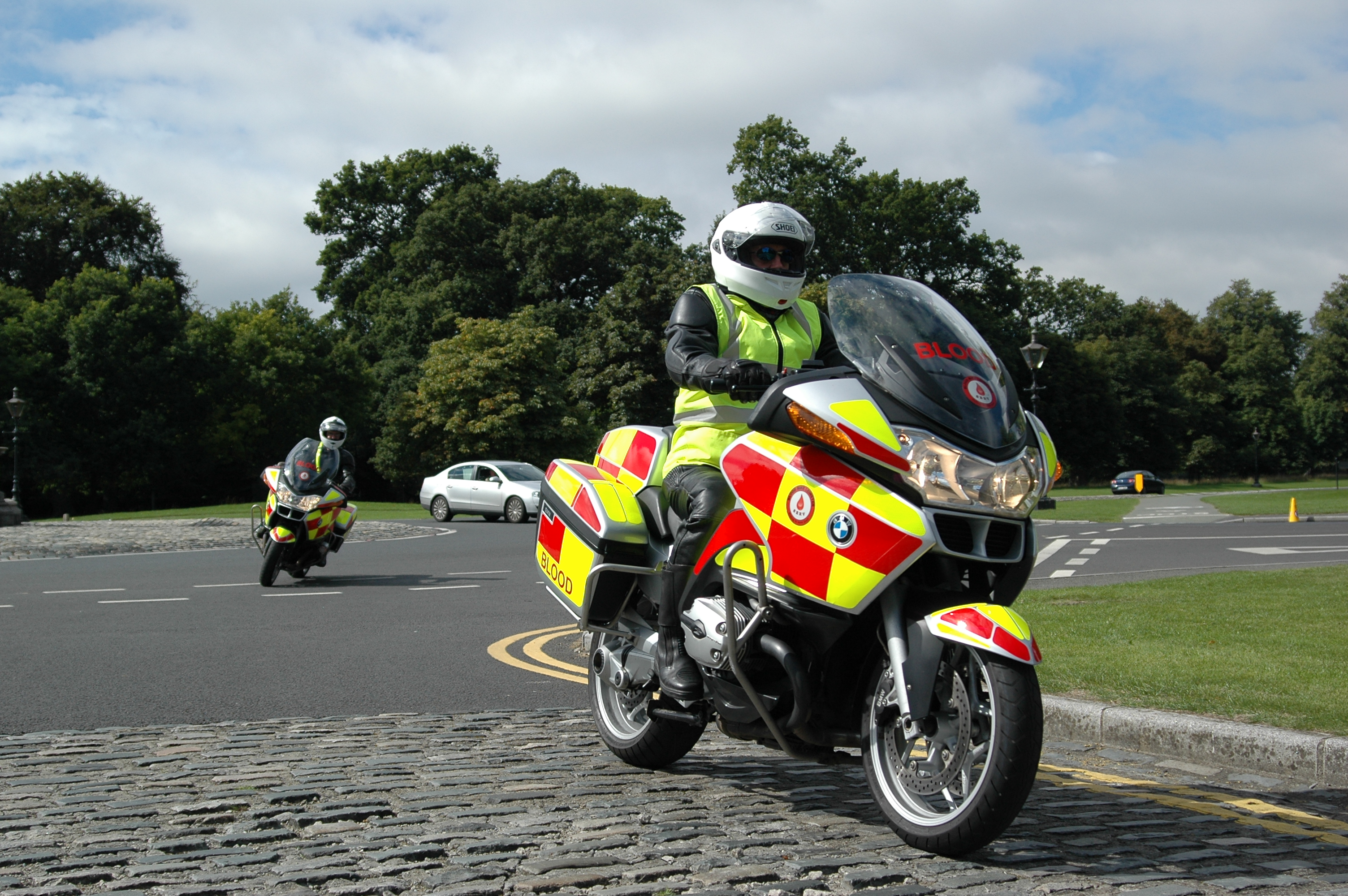
Two BMW R1200RT blood bikes operated by SERV, in Ireland, 2013

A blood bike is a specialist motorcycle modified for use as a courier vehicle for the prompt transportation of urgent and emergency medical items; primarily blood, but also including X-rays, tissue samples, surgical tools, human milk, spinal fluids, drugs, and documentation; between hospitals and other healthcare facilities.

In the United Kingdom and Ireland, a network of largely independent registered charities, whose members are all unpaid volunteers, provide blood bike courier services in collaboration with their local healthcare authorities. All Blood Bike groups except North West Blood Bikes Lancs & Lakes are represented through the Nationwide Association of Blood Bikes (NABB), itself a registered charity (number 1198195). NABB requires that its members hold advanced rider qualifications.

Commercially run blood bike courier services also exist.

== History ==
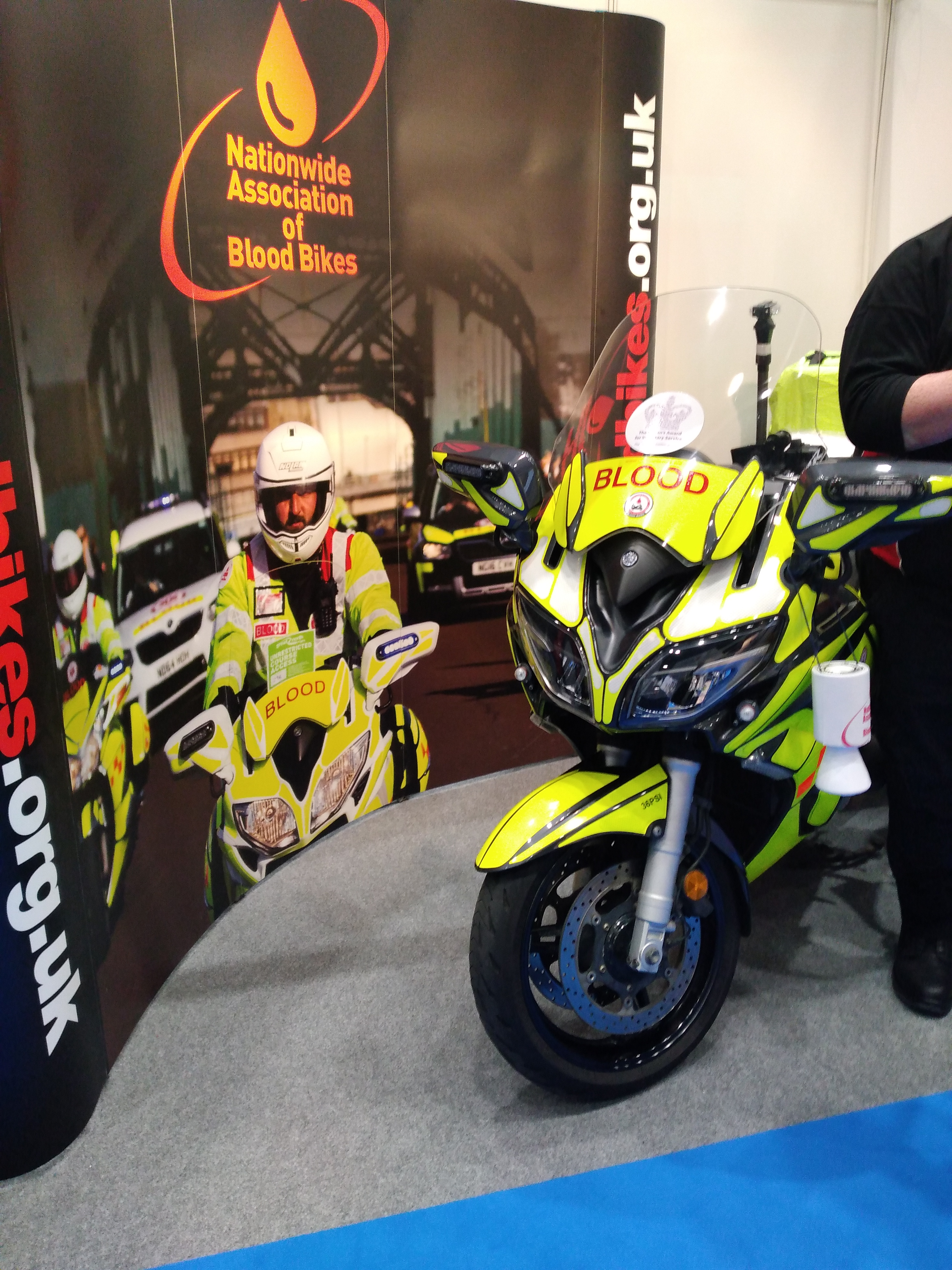
Nationwide Association of Blood Bikes exhibition stand

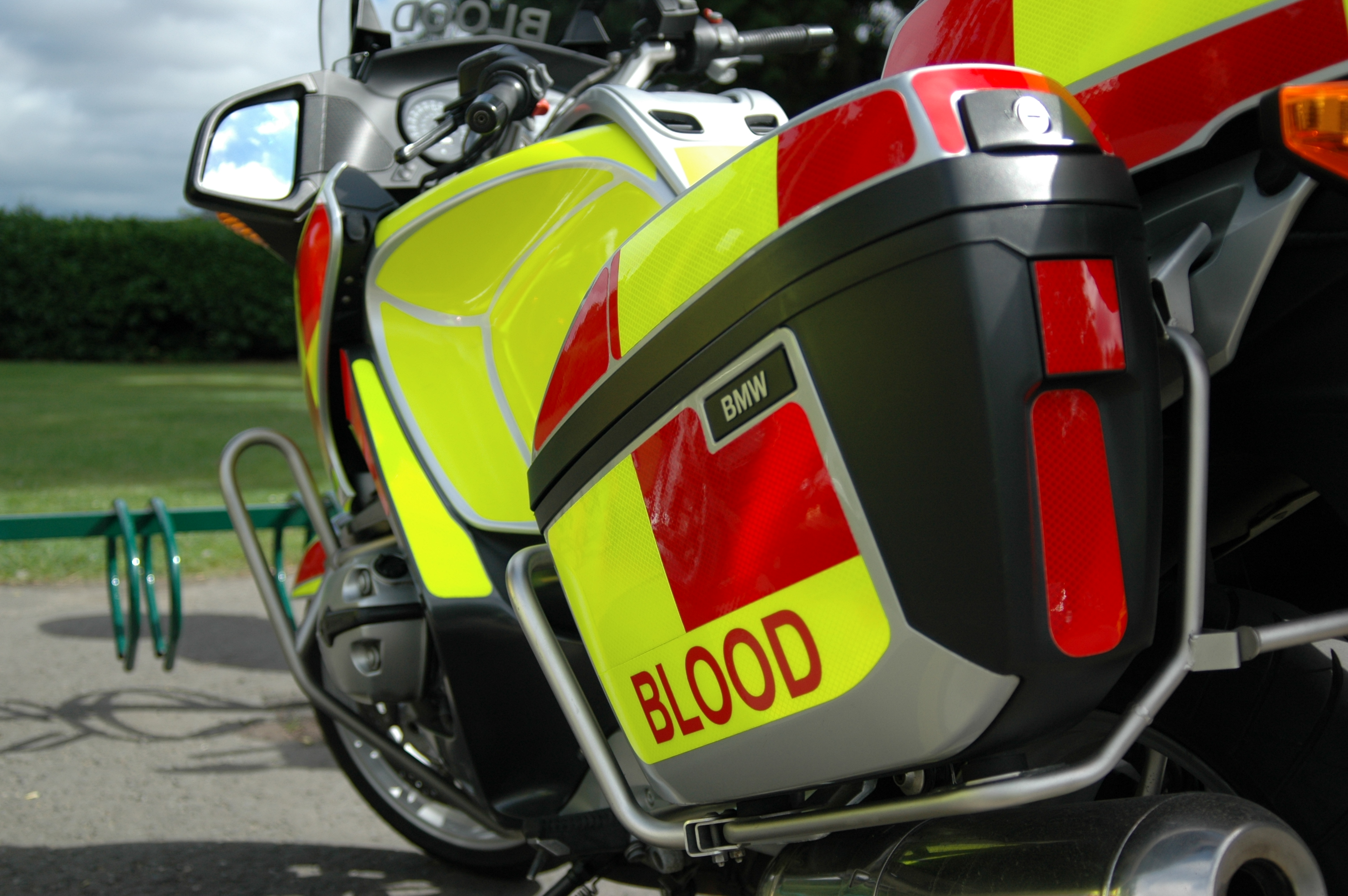
Close-up of 'BLOOD' identification and battenburg markings

The first blood bike volunteer group to be established in the United Kingdom was the Emergency Volunteer Service (EVS), formed in 1962 in Surrey, England, by Margaret Ryerson and her husband. In 1969, the Freewheelers youth community action group formed in Stevenage which initially served hospitals in Stevenage, Luton, Dunstable, Bedford, and Hitchin. These original groups are no longer operating, but other groups emerged that provide similar services.

Yeovil Freewheelers was founded in 1978. In 1981, SERV (Service by Emergency Response Volunteers), which formed shortly after the original EVS disbanded, and the North East Thames Region Emergency Voluntary Service (also known as the EVS) in north-east London, were founded. North East Thames Region EVS disbanded in November 1998, but SERV continues to operate as a number of different groups.

The Nationwide Association of Blood Bikes was established in 2008 to promote professional standards across all the member blood bike groups.

As an example of the scale of their operations, in 2010, one group made 2,500 deliveries at a cost of around £25,000, paid for by charitable donations, which according to NABB saved the NHS over £120,000. There are no exact figures for how much blood bikes save the NHS annually, however NABB estimates that it was approximately £1.4 million in 2016 from its 56,000 blood bike journeys.

In the August 2018 Budget, the government introduced Vehicle Excise Duty (VED) exemption for blood bikes vehicles, effective from April 2020, "to align the tax treatment of the transportation of blood and medical supplies by the national charity Blood Bikes with other emergency vehicles". However, blood bikes cannot use blue lights and sirens, unlike the three statutory emergency services as NABB's application to use them has been rejected. That status was re-emphasised by the Secretary of State for Transport in 2023, following the death of a blood bike rider while using blue lights.

== Blood bike groups ==
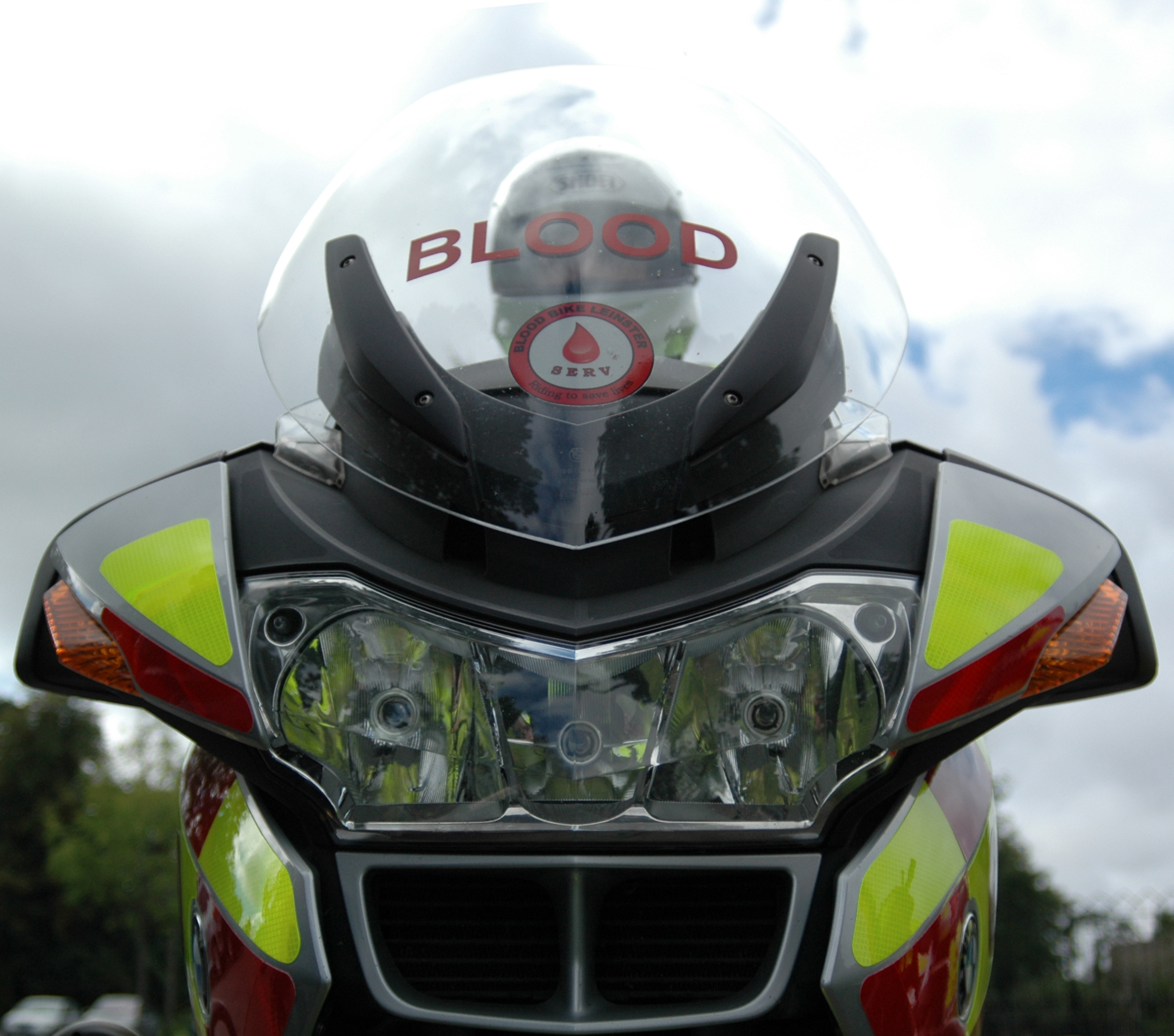
Blood Bike Leinster close-up view showing its logo and motto: 'riding to save lives'.

There are a number of blood bike groups operating in the UK and Ireland. These include:

=== England ===
Blood bike charities in England include:

- Freewheelers EVS – Bath, Bristol, Gloucestershire (south), Somerset, West Wiltshire
- Greater Manchester Blood Bikes – Greater Manchester
- Nottinghamshire Blood Bikes – Nottinghamshire
- SERV – various areas
- Severn Freewheelers – Gloucestershire, Herefordshire, North Wiltshire, Worcestershire
- Whiteknights Yorkshire Blood Bikes – Yorkshire
- North West Blood Bikes Lancs & Lakes (NWBB-LL) – North West England with a focus on Lancashire and the Lake district.

In 2019, Warwickshire and Solihull Blood Bikes, which was established in 2012, was told that University Hospitals Coventry and Warwickshire NHS Trust was dispensing with its services, and would be replaced by a commercial contract with QE Facilities, a subsidiary company of Gateshead Health NHS Foundation Trust.

=== Scotland ===
- ScotsERVS (Scottish Emergency Rider Volunteer Service)
- North East Rider Volunteers Scotland SCIO (NERVS)
- Highland & Islands Blood Bikes (HAIBB)
- Blood Bikes Scotland (BBS)
- Dumfries & Galloway Blood Bikes (DGBB)

=== Wales ===
- Blood Bikes Wales

=== Ireland ===
- Blood Bike Leinster – Leinster Ireland, motto: "riding to save lives"

== Awards ==
Several groups in the United Kingdom have received the King's Award for Voluntary Service (formerly the Queen's Award), which is equivalent in status to being appointed an MBE:

Year of award	Blood bike group	Ref.
2008	Freewheelers EVS	
2016	North West Blood Bikes Lancashire & Lakes	
2017	Northumbria Blood Bikes	
2017	SERV Sussex	
2018	Shropshire, Staffordshire and Cheshire Blood Bikes	
2019	SERV Suffolk & Cambridgeshire	
2020	SERV Surrey and London	
2020	SERV Kent	
2021	Blood Bikes Wales	
2025	Highland and Islands Blood Bikes	
2026	Lincolnshire Emergency Blood Bikes Service	

== Blood Bike Awareness Day ==
The first Blood Bike Awareness Day took place on 14 August 2015, with initial support provided by O2 and has continued annually since. It is to be held on the second Friday of August; being summer, the news cycle is often devoid of political stories and there is a greater propensity for journalists to fill airtime with such awareness days.

== Incidents ==
Motorcyclists are classified as vulnerable road users, as when the casualty and fatality numbers are adjusted to passenger miles covered, it is the most dangerous form of transport when compared to walking, cycling, and various four wheeled motor vehicles. Since 2016, five blood bike riders have been killed or seriously injured in collisions.

== See also ==
- Emergency medical services in the United Kingdom
  - National Health Service
  - NHS Blood and Transplant
- Emergency medical services in Ireland
