= North West Air Ambulance =

English charity air ambulance

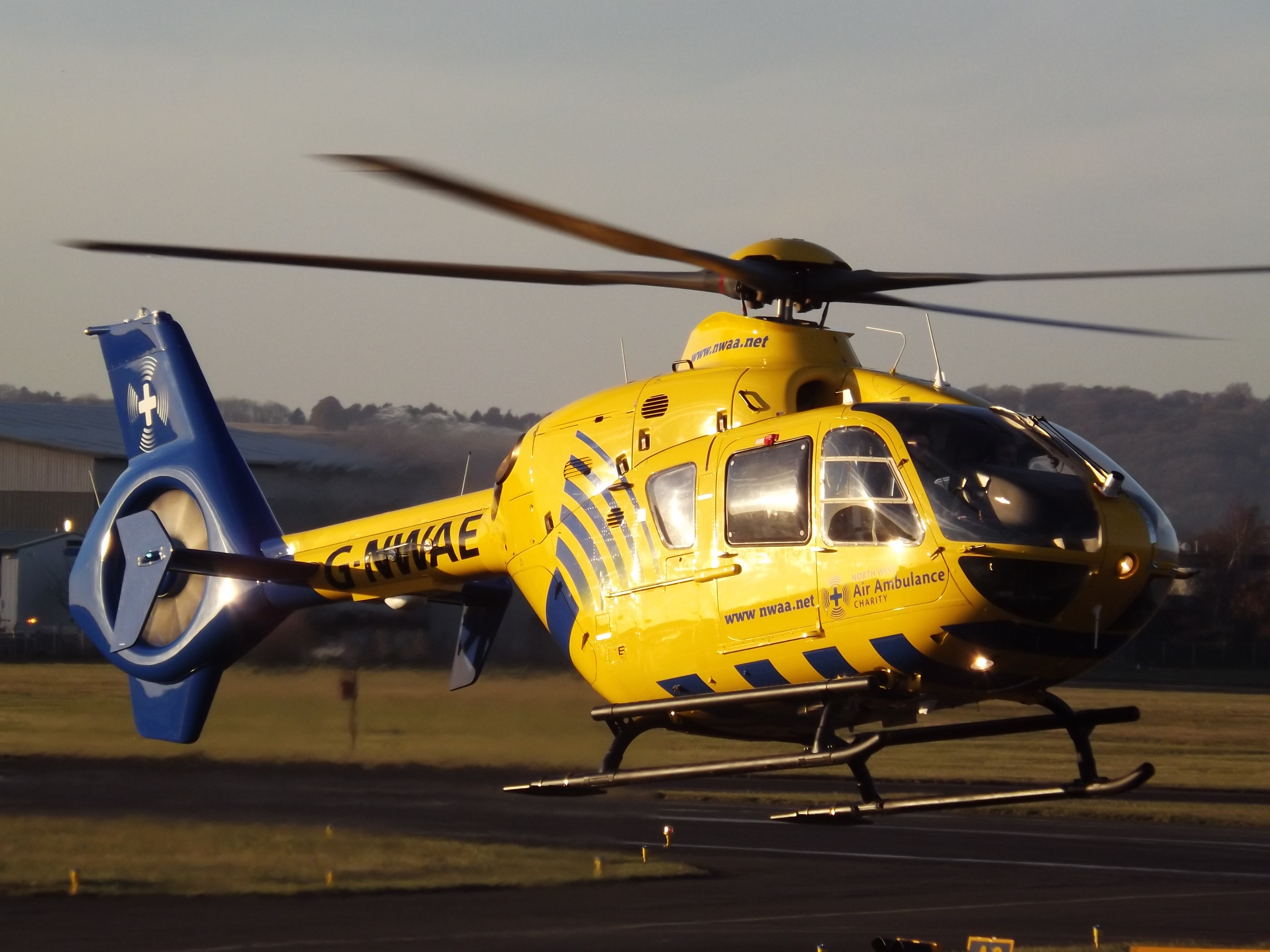
- A Eurocopter EC135 of the North West Air Ambulance (G-NWAE in December 2016).
- Founded: 19 May 1999
- Type: Charitable organisation
- Registration no.: 1075641
- Locations: Blackpool Airport; Manchester Barton Aerodrome
- Region served: Cheshire; Cumbria; Lancashire; Greater Manchester; Merseyside
- Chief Executive Officer: Heather Arrowsmith
- Aircraft operated: Eurocopter EC135
- Slogan: Flying to save lives
- Revenue: £15.7 million (2024)
- Staff: 100 (2024)
- Volunteers: 800 (2024)
- Website: www.nwairambulance.org.uk

The charity's two operational bases in the North West

North West Air Ambulance (NWAA) is the helicopter emergency medical service (HEMS) that covers the North West England region, consisting of the counties of Cheshire, Cumbria, Lancashire, Greater Manchester and Merseyside.

== History ==
NWAA has existed since 1999. It was established with a single aircraft based at Blackpool Airport and has since upgraded to three Eurocopter EC135 aircraft: one based at Blackpool Airport and the other two at Manchester Barton Aerodrome.

The charity is not funded by the government (apart from grants) or by the NHS, instead it raises funds via its 11 charity shops, fundraising events, gifts in wills, the lottery, personal challenges undertaken by individuals In the year ending March 2022, the charity raised £11.2 million, including £66,000 from government grants. It spent £11.6M, of which £6.9M was used to provide the air ambulance service. In the year ending March 2024, its revenue was £15.7 million with no government grants. It spent £14.3M, of which £8.6M was used to provide the air ambulance service.

The charity covers an area of over 5,500 square miles (14,000 km^{2}) and over 8 million people. Between 1999 and 2022, the charity responded to 24,500 call-outs. In 2022, an average call-out cost £3,500, with more specialised interventions costing more.

== Fleet ==
=== Helicopters ===
The service uses three Eurocopter EC135 aircraft operated by Babcock Mission Critical Services Onshore, which have top speeds of over 150 mph (240 km/h), and fly during daylight hours 365 days a year. The helicopters do not attend HEMS missions at night. Due to the critical medical nature of HEMS missions, the NWAA fleet has special permissions from the Civil Aviation Authority to fly in worse weather conditions than other aircraft. In the winter months, a helicopter can fly to the scene of an incident towards the end of the day in daylight, but depart the scene or hospital after darkness has fallen to return to base. The NWAA helicopter fleet include:

- G-NWAA (built 2005) − based at Blackpool Airport and uses air traffic control call sign Helimed 08. This aircraft generally covers the Northern counties of Lancashire and Cumbria.
- G-NWEM (built 2003) − based at Barton and uses call sign Helimed 72. This aircraft carries a doctor and a paramedic, and generally covers the southern counties of Cheshire, Greater Manchester and Merseyside.
- G-NWAE (built 2003) − based at Barton, uses call sign Helimed 75.

Although the aircraft have their allocated counties, they will often cross into each other's areas should operational needs require it. The average response time is 10 minutes from take-off to landing at the scene of an accident. Most areas in North West can be reached within 25 minutes.

=== Cars ===
As the helicopters can only fly in daylight, in February 2018, a £65,000 BMW X5 (X5 Xdrive25d Se Auto) road vehicle was added to the fleet. This has been given the name "Air Ambulance Response Unit" (or 'RU' for short). As a rapid response vehicle, it enables doctors and paramedics to carry out some of their work during the hours of darkness (6pm–2am), poor weather or when an aircraft requires maintenance.

In 2019–20, researchers from Lancaster University Management School constructed and validated a predictive simulation model to consider the prospective performance of a single air ambulance vs. a single rapid response vehicle during the hours of darkness. Subsequent trials validated the study findings. In April 2022, another BMW (X5 Xdrive30d Xline Auto) SUV was donated by Beaverbrooks to become a Critical Care Vehicle, and in November 2022, a BMW 530D Xdrive Se Mhev Auto (Electric Diesel) has been added and became the "night car", while the 2018 X5, being less stable at high speed (95mph), has since been used for fundraising events.

== Operations ==
=== Medical interventions ===
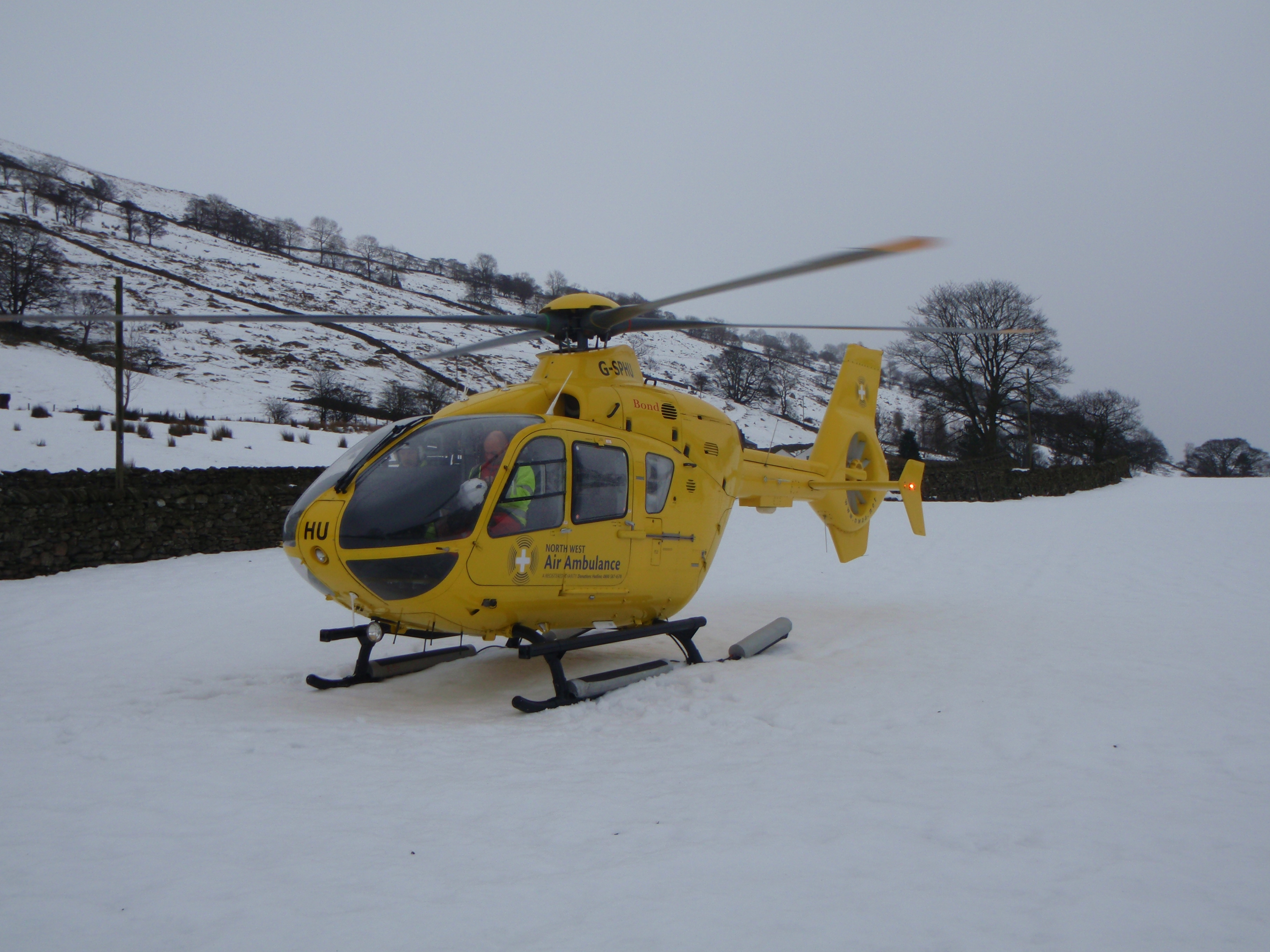
One of the air ambulances attending an incident in snowy weather conditions

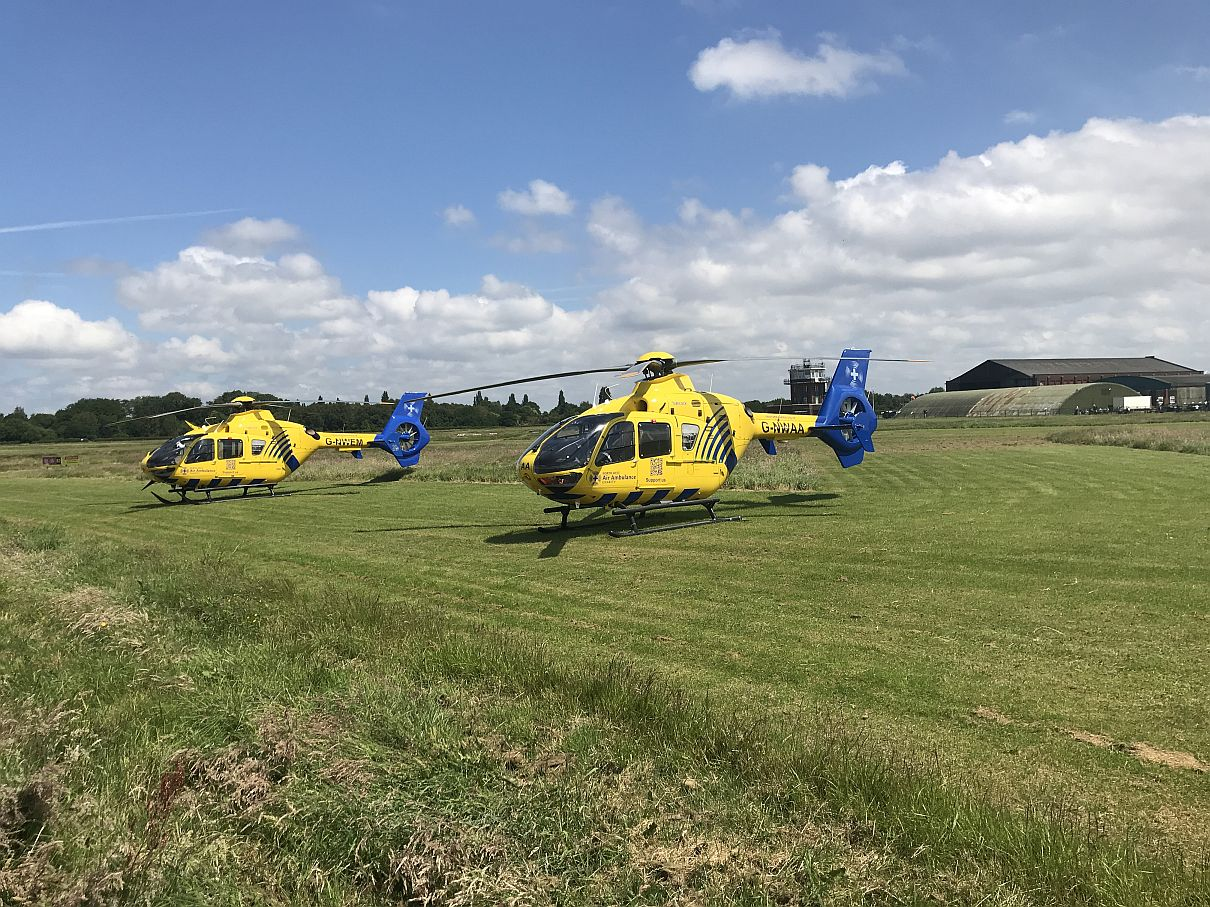
G-NWAA and G-NWEM helicopters at Manchester Barton Aerodrome (23 June 2024)

The medical interventions provided at the scene are of a hospital standard, and were historically only done in critical care settings, including blood transfusion, emergency anaesthetics, Rapid Sequence Intubation (RSI; 136 performed in the financial year 2021-22, and 125 in the year before) and chest surgery to make the critically injured patient stable enough to be transported to hospital. They have provided interventions such as thoracostomy (chest incission to remove excess fluid or air) and ultrasound to check for internal bleeding.

=== Crew ===
The 48-strong team of critical care paramedics who provide the patient care for incidents attended by NWAA are provided on two year secondments by the North West Ambulance Service. The medics are extensively trained in areas such as helicopter safety, navigation and aviation law as well as advanced medical procedures beyond those performed by their land based colleagues. In addition to the paramedics, on one helicopter from Manchester Barton base (Helimed 72) there is a pre-hospital emergency medicine trained doctor.

The pilots, along with the helicopters themselves are provided by emergency helicopter specialist Babcock Mission Critical Services Onshore.

=== Blood ===
All three aircraft carry blood on board for life-saving blood transfers at the scene of an accident. The blood is delivered to the helicopter bases at Barton and Blackpool on motorbikes by another charity, Greater Manchester Blood Bikes. NWAA is one of ten charities taking part in a two-year trial (starting 15 December 2022) of carrying whole blood (group O Rh negative − compatible with anyone) instead of red blood cells which were carried by UK Air Ambulances since 2012. The advantage lies in the blood containing platelets which help blood to clot.

=== Helicopter dispatch ===
Control of the aircraft was initially the responsibility of the emergency medical dispatchers working in local North West Ambulance Service control rooms. However, in February 2008, a central Air Desk at Ambulance Control in Broughton, Preston was introduced which prioritised requests for the air ambulance in an attempt to increase efficiency.

== See also ==
- Air ambulances in the United Kingdom
