= Nottinghamshire Blood Bikes =

Nottinghamshire Blood Bikes is a blood bike group which provides an out-of-hours emergency response service to the National Health Service, delivering blood and other urgent medical supplies such as platelets, blood plasma, samples and medical records by motorcycle between hospitals in Nottinghamshire, England.

It is a non-profit charity, run entirely by unpaid volunteers, and receives no government funding, relying solely on donations and corporate sponsorship.
