= Greater Manchester Blood Bikes =

English blood bike charity

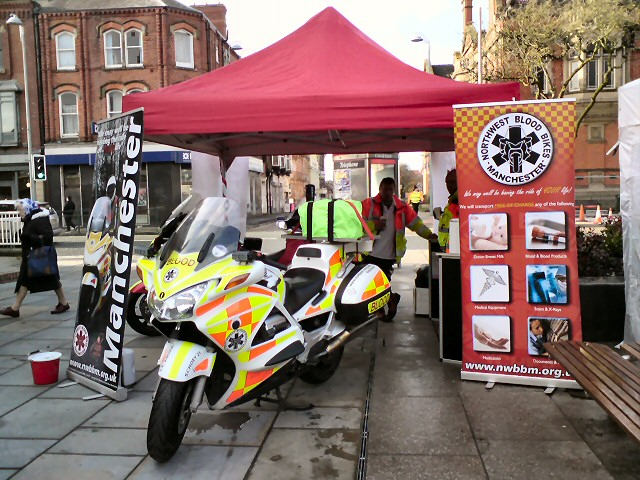
- Greater Manchester Blood Bikes
- Founded: 15 November 2022
- Type: Charitable incorporated organisation
- Registration no.: 1201009
- Location: Oldham
- Region served: Greater Manchester
- Chair: Russ Harrison
- Website: https://www.gmbb.org.uk/
- Formerly called: New Charity in 2022

Greater Manchester Blood Bikes is a UK charity providing courier services for the transportation of urgent and emergency medical items such as blood, human milk, platelets, samples, and vaccines, operating in Greater Manchester.

The group, originally set up in 2011, closed operations and transferred their assets along with the "on call" phone number to a new charity, registered as a charitable incorporated organisation in November 2022. Having started operations on 1 January 2023, the new group covers the same geographical area and is composed of experienced volunteers from Blood Bikes Manchester (also known as NorthWest Blood Bikes Manchester).

In 2019, the charity estimated that they had saved the NHS and hospices £341,350 in six years. The government recognised them as an emergency service that alleviated high night-time costs of couriers and taxis. In October 2021, the charity was covering 1700+ miles per week on 4 motorcycles and a car which was used in inclement weather conditions. In December 2021, with 57 volunteers, the annual costs were £37,029. GMBB raise funds from donors, at charity events, from bucket collections, and online through PayPal, Just Giving, Buy Me a Coffee and Easy Fundraising.

The motorcycle and car rides are provided by volunteers at night, daytime weekends and bank holidays. The vehicles are marked with the word BLOOD in front and covered in yellow and orange liveries allowing them to stand out despite missing blue lights. The riders may not exceed speed limits or go through red lights, but hold advanced driving qualifications. Riders operate from home, working with a duty controller who acts as a dispatcher taking calls and dispatching the riders. They aim for a 90-minute service from receiving a call to delivering the cargo. On each shift, there are at least two riders and one car.

GMBB work with several hospitals in the area, including Salford Royal, Wythenshawe Hospital, Tameside General Hospital and Stepping Hill, and deliver blood to North West Air Ambulance helicopters based at Barton Aerodrome and Blackpool Airport.
