= SERV (charity) =

Service by Emergency Rider Volunteers
- Founded: 11 July 1981
- Type: Registered charity
- Location: England
- Services: NHS motorcycle courier
- Employees: 0

Service by Emergency Rider Volunteers / Service by Emergency Response Volunteers, or SERV, is the name used by a number of blood bike charities based in England, whose volunteers provide a motorcycle courier service, free of charge, to the National Health Service and the air ambulance charities. The original SERV group was established in 1981.

== SERV groups ==
Charities that use the SERV name operate across England:

- SERV Surrey & London,
- SERV Sussex,
- SERV Kent,
- SERV Ox Bucks Berks and Northants (OBN),
- SERV Suffolk and Cambridge,
- SERV Norfolk,
- SERV Wessex,
- SERV Herts & Beds.

Their volunteers work outside normal office hours and use either their own or the charity's dedicated response motorcycles to transport items such as blood for transfusion, blood samples for pathological or microbiological analysis, drugs, patient notes, x-rays, scans, medical equipment, samples, vaccines and donated human breast milk.

The SERV groups work closely with other blood bike groups when transport over longer distances is required, these are known as 'relay runs'. Some of the SERV groups were founder members of the Nationwide Association of Blood Bikes (NABB).

== Recognition & COVID-19 ==
SERV charities clock up thousands of runs each year, and rely solely on donations to run.

Many SERV charities have been recognised for their work by receiving the Queen's Award for Voluntary Service (QVAS), most recently SERV Surrey and London and SERV Kent received their awards in 2020 and SERV Herts & Beds in 2022 for services during the pandemic.

== Cars and four-wheeled Vehicles ==
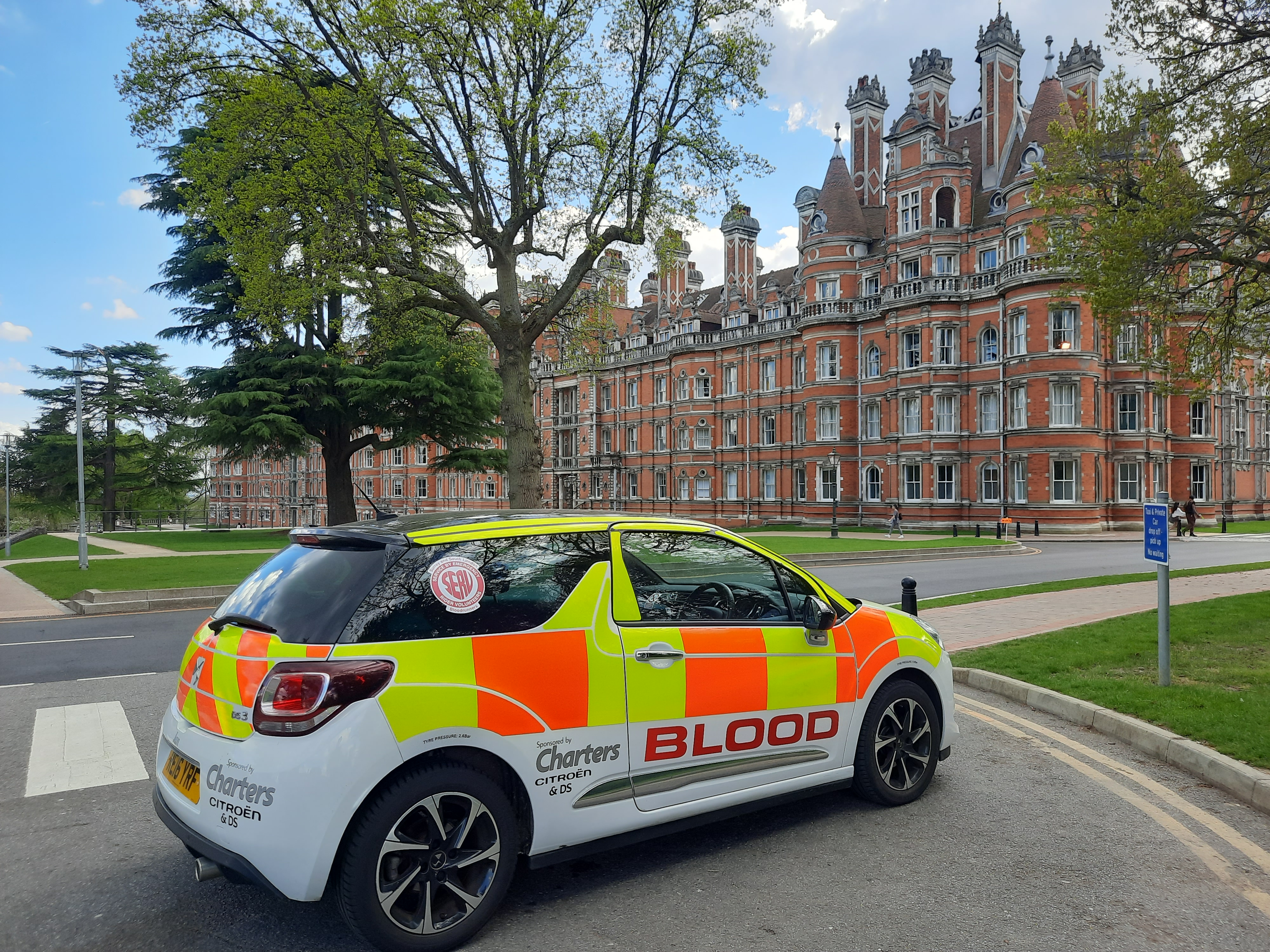
SERV Surrey & London DS3, Jan, donated by Charters. Pictured in front of Royal Holloway University, in Surrey.

Blood bike groups also have four-wheel vehicles for day-to-day use, and some groups only use four wheels when conditions deteriorate in the winter.

Similarly to the motorcycles, all vehicles are bought and run purely on donations.

== Air Ambulance ==
SERV charities often resupply regional air ambulances with blood products on a 24/7, 365 basis. This does involve volunteers going out and performing restock runs on Christmas Day.

SERV Surrey & London and SERV Kent both restock the Kent, Surrey, Sussex Air Ambulance (AAKSS), SERV Suffolk restocks the East Anglian Air Ambualnce, and so on.
