= Motorcycle courier =

Person who delivers parcels or messages on an engined two-wheeled vehicle

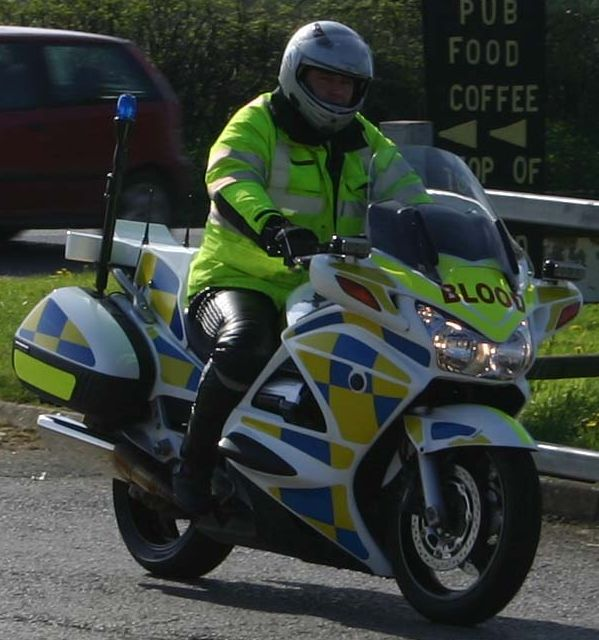
Honda ST1300 Pan European operated by Freewheelers EVS Blood Bikes charity in South West England

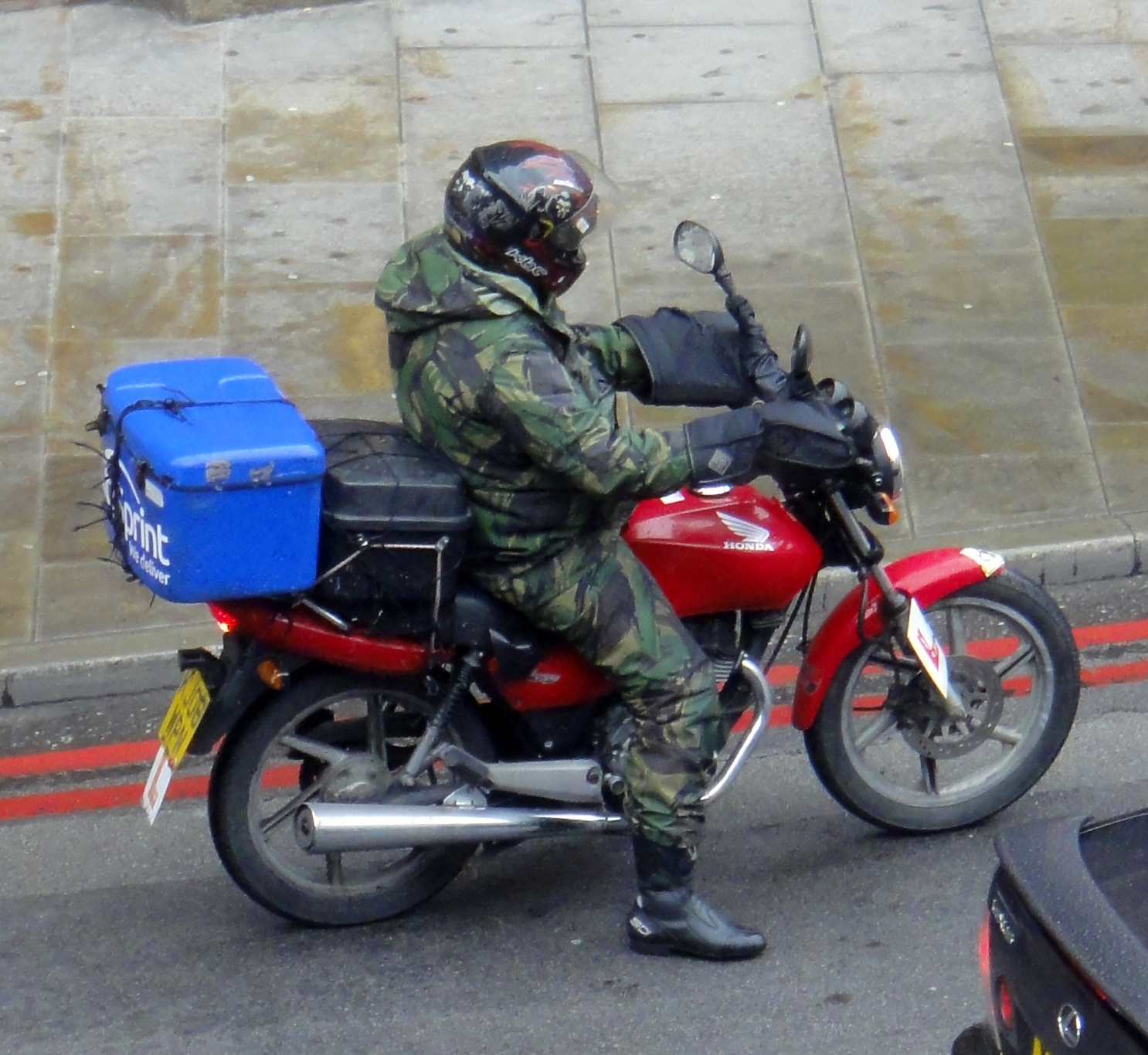
Motorcycle courier in London, England

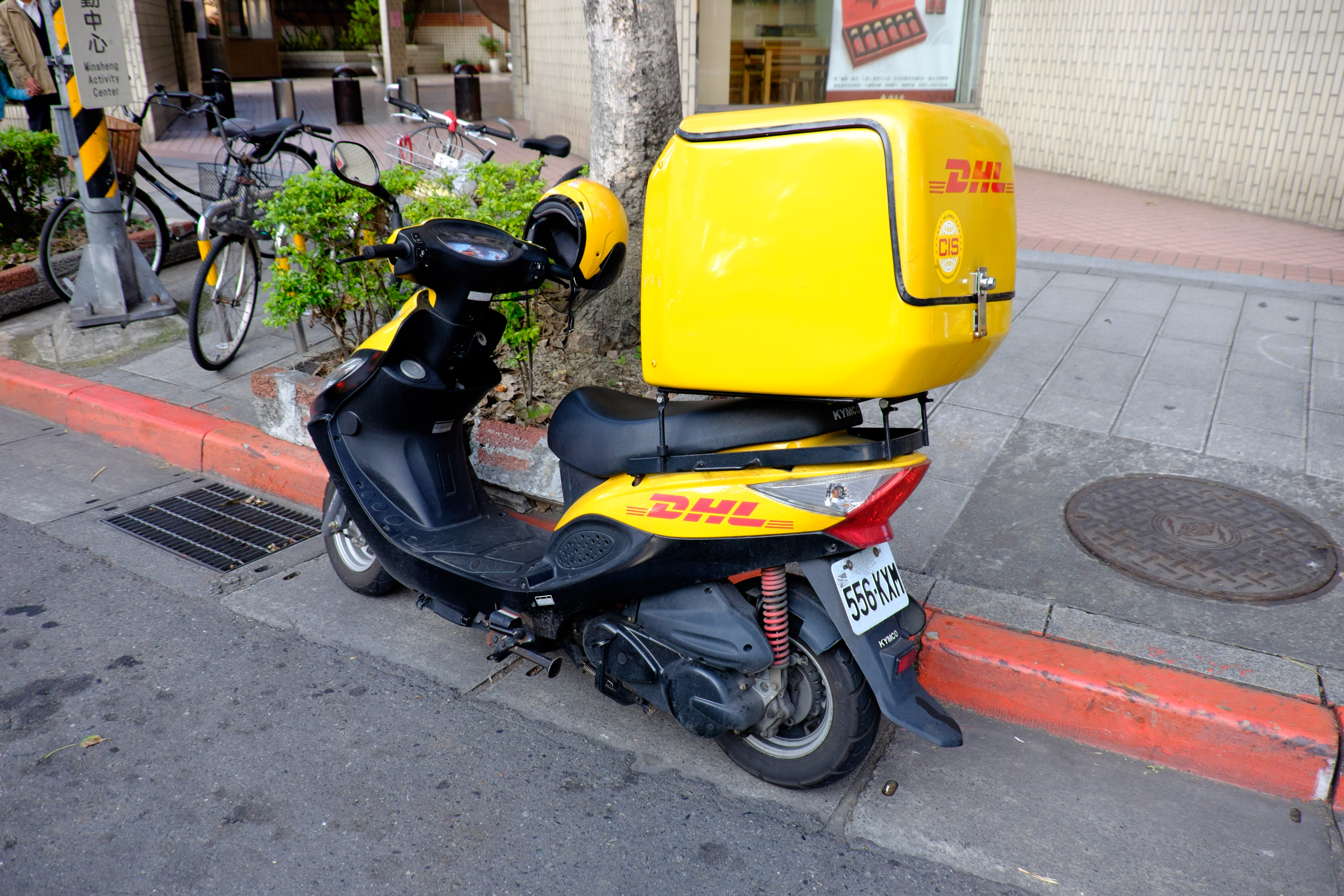
DHL courier scooter in Taipei, Taiwan

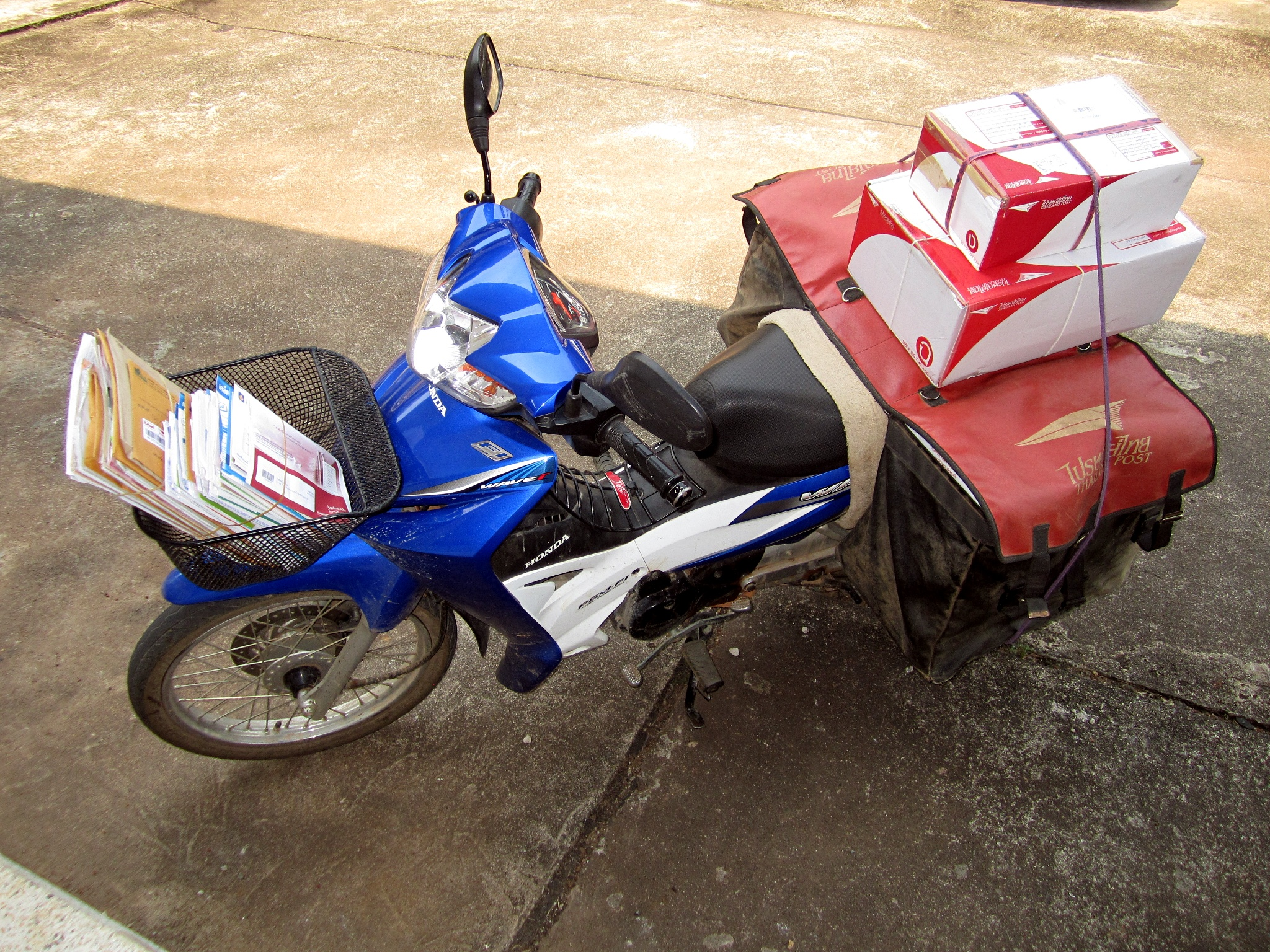
Thailand Post bike loaded with letters and parcels

A motorcycle courier, also known as a despatch rider or motorcycle messenger, is a courier using a motorcycle.

Motorcycle couriers are common in the major urban centres of Europe, South America (especially Brazil), Asia and North America.

== History ==
At the end of the First World War in 1918, many British Army Royal Corps of Signals motorcycle despatch riders were demobilised and found employment difficult to come by. As a result, they purchased military surplus motorcycles, and began couriering in central London. Following World War II, increasing urban congestion in London saw riders on small motorcycles making scheduled runs with artwork or copy between printers and advertising agencies or newspapers.

In London, radio controlled messengers became especially popular following the 1971 Royal Mail strike when motorcycles were fitted with bulky mini-cab radios. Businesses were pleased with the results and the courier industry took off from the mid-1970s. Pioneers in London included Special Delivery, Yellow Express, GLH, Ambassador, Mercury Despatch, Addison Lee, Security Despatch, Pony Express, Inter City Couriers and City of London Courier Company. By this time Motorola bleepers as well as handheld radios independent of the motorcycle's battery were in widespread use. The advent of bicycle couriers and the fax machine in the mid-1980s, as well as the need for appropriate insurance and e-mail in the 1990s, saw an end to the high-earning boom years of the late 1970s and early 1980s for London's motorcycle couriers. However, in the congested cities and capitals of many developing countries, motorcycle couriers are as popular as ever for urban deliveries.

== Types of motorcycle couriers ==
Some couriers work for courier companies on an open circuit with a radio or bleeper, rather like minicabs. Earnings depend on the volume of work and the size of the fleet, and up to a point the speed and street knowledge of the rider. With the greater distances covered in this sort of work, the expenses in running the machine can account for at least 20% of earnings.

Some couriers are 'in-house' messengers working for news agencies for a set wage and on set hours, usually staying in the city centre and riding to and from the same places. Running expenses are much reduced, as is the unpredictable nature of the open circuit.

Most motorcycle couriers on the open circuit use machines no bigger than 600 cc, which are light and economical in town but adequate enough for occasional long-distance work.

Motorcycle couriers are especially common in countries like Singapore because the cost of car ownership is very high due to car taxes and a Certificate of Entitlement (COE).

== See also ==
- Blood bike
- E-scooter
